= Horror fiction magazine =

Type of magazine

A horror fiction magazine is a magazine that publishes primarily horror fiction with the main purpose of frightening the reader. Horror magazines can be in print, on the internet, or both.

== Major horror magazines ==
=== Defunct magazines ===
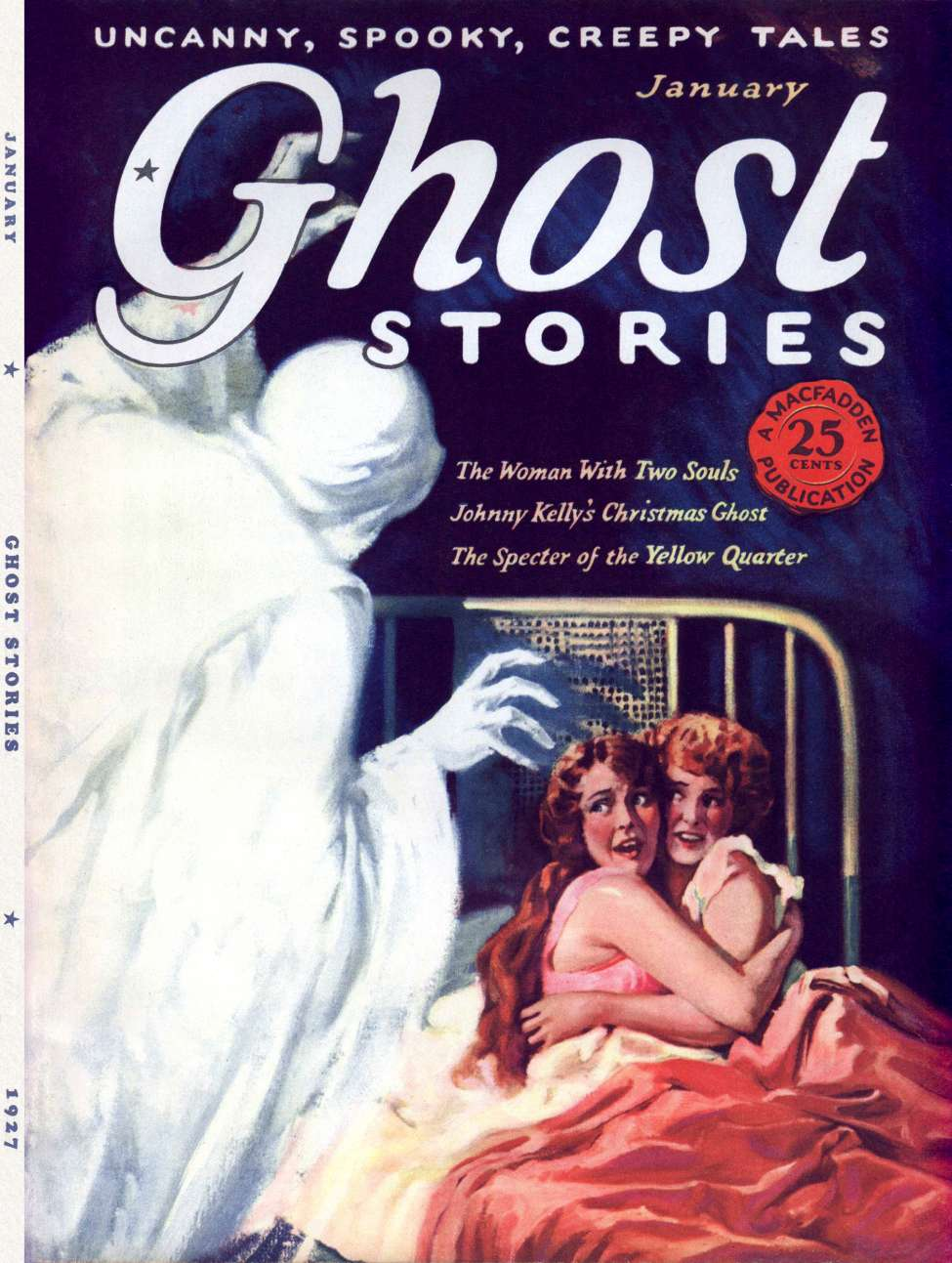
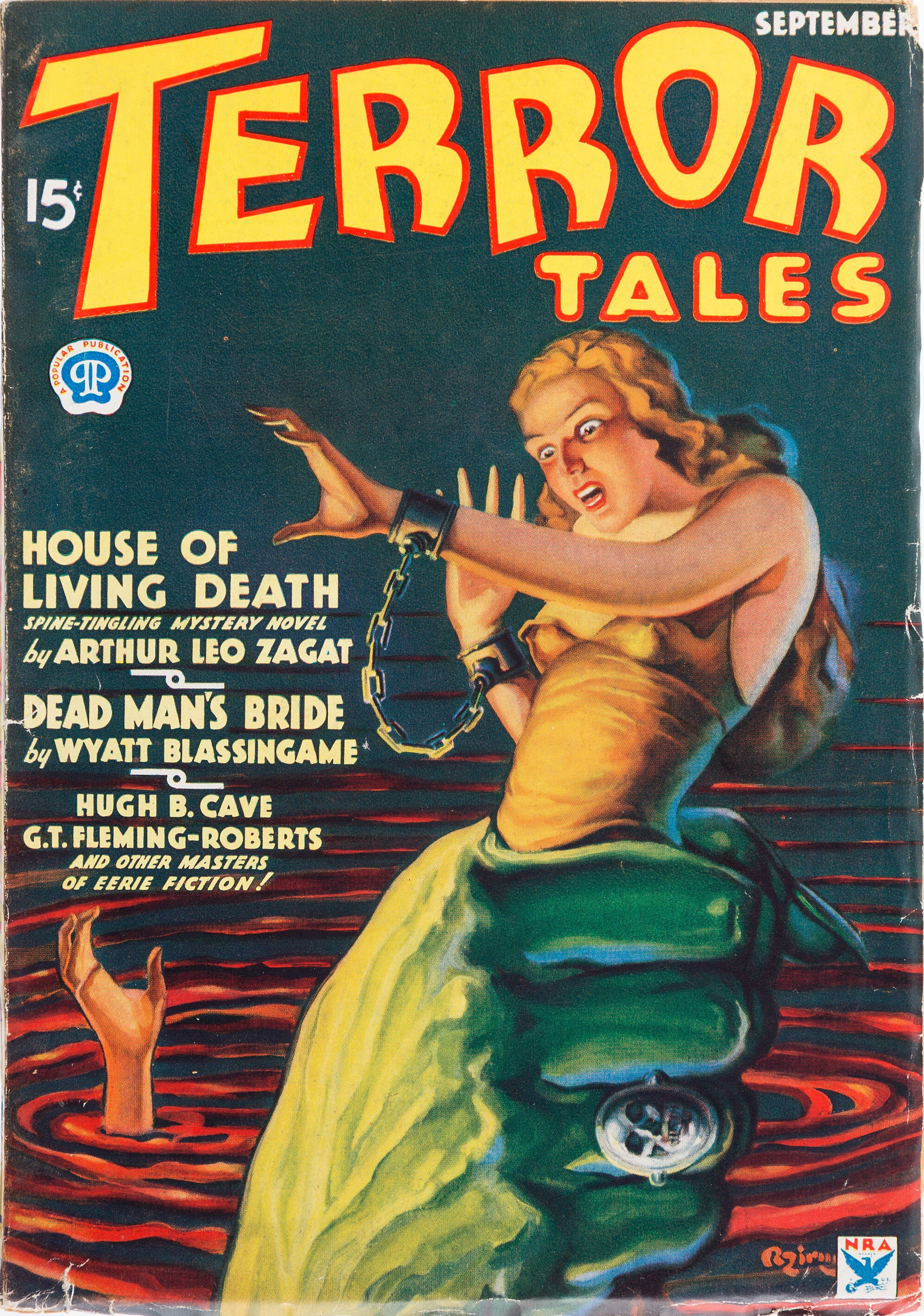
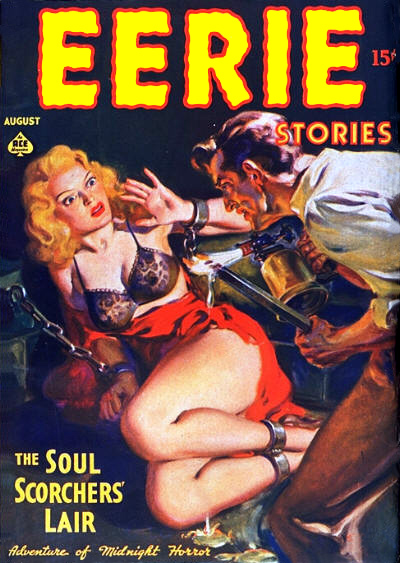
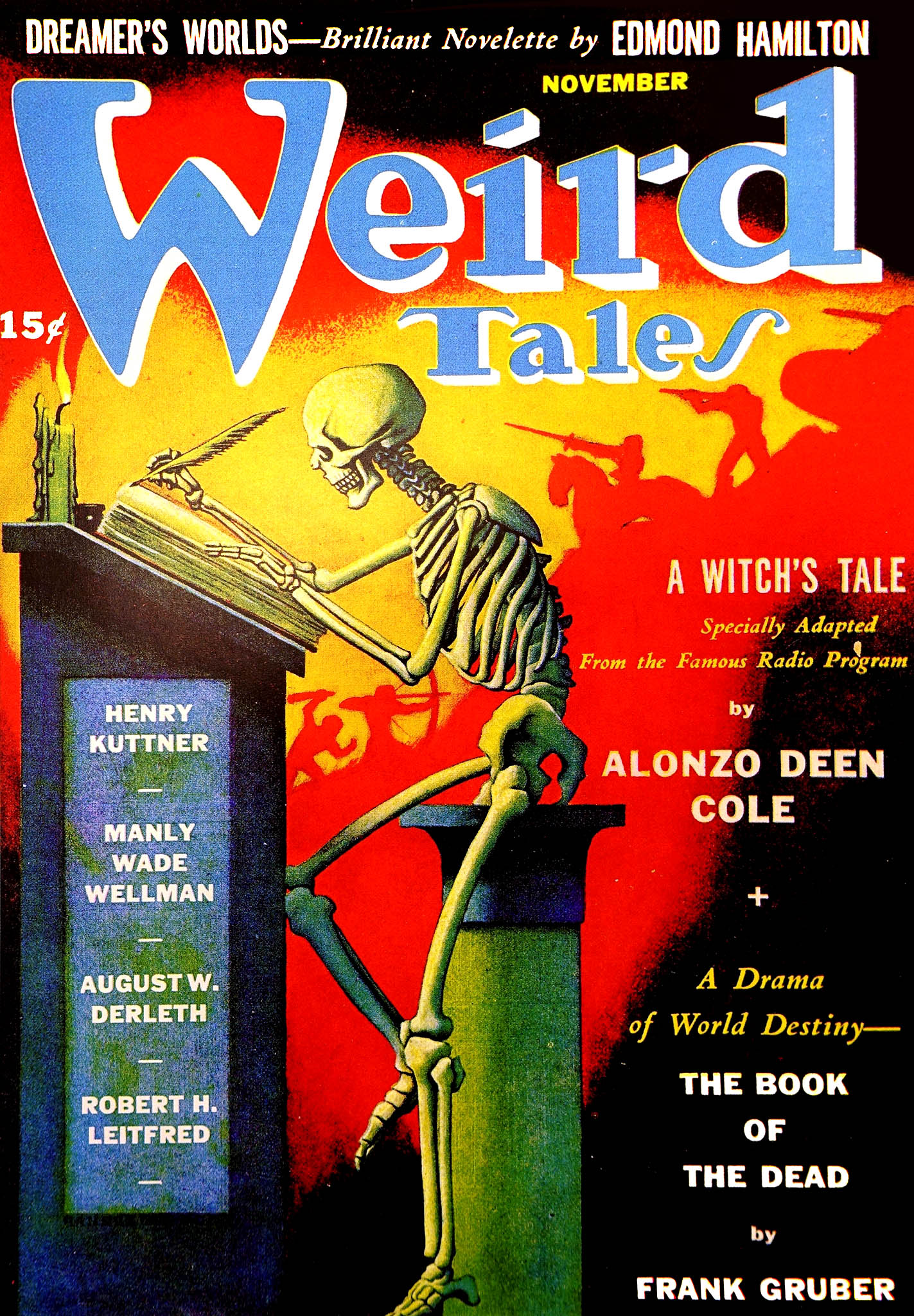
- The Arkham Collector, 1967–1971
- The Arkham Sampler, 1948–1949
- The Australian Horror and Fantasy Magazine
- Bards and Sages Quarterly, 2009–2024
- Black Static, 1994–2023
- Castle of Frankenstein, 1962–1975, 1999–2002
- Deathrealm, 1987–1997
- Eerie Stories, 1937
- Fantázia, 1997–2011, Slovakia
- Ghost Stories, 1926–1932
- GUD Magazine, 2006–2021, print/pdf
- H. P. Lovecraft's Magazine of Horror, 2006–2009
- Horror Stories, 1935–1941
- Ideomancer, 2001–2015
- Macabre Cadaver, 2008–2011
- Midnight Street, 2004-2024
- Der Orchideengarten, 1919–1921, Germany
- Paradox Magazine, 2003–07
- Shadowed Realms, 2004–06
- Shock Totem
- Something Wicked, 2006–2011, South Africa
- Strange Stories, 1939–1941
- Strange Tales, 1946
- Strange Tales of Mystery and Terror, 1931–1933
- Terror Australis, 1988–1992
- Terror Tales, 1934–1941
- The Third Alternative, 1994–2005
- Twilight Zone, literature, 1981–1989
- Uncanny Stories, 1941
- Uncanny Tales, 1939–1943
- Web Terror Stories, 1962–1965
- Weird Tales, 1923–2014
- Whispers, 1971–1997

=== Extant magazines ===
- Abyss & Apex
- Andromeda Spaceways Inflight Magazine
- Apex Digest
- Cemetery Dance
- Clarkesworld Magazine, webzine
- The Horror Zine
- The Magazine of Fantasy & Science Fiction
- Not One of Us
- Space and Time
- Subterranean Magazine, webzine
- Three-Lobed Burning Eye, 1999–present, online/anthology

=== Horror comic magazines ===
- Creepy (Warren Publications)
- Eerie (Warren Publications)
- Vampirella (Warren Publications)

== See also ==
- Fantasy fiction magazine
- Science fiction magazine
