= Eerie Mysteries =

American pulp magazine

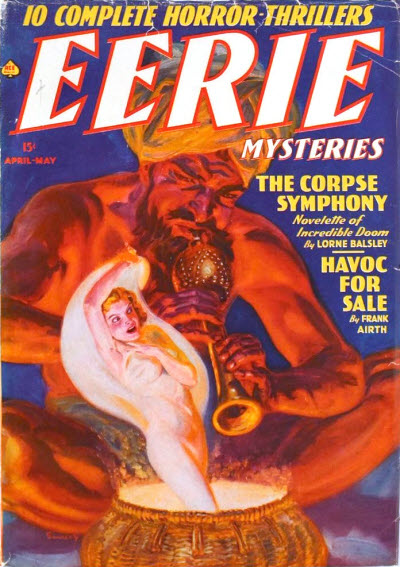
Cover of the final issue, April/May 1939. Art is by Norman Saunders.

Eerie Mysteries was an American weird menace pulp magazine that published four issues in 1938 and 1939. This was Ace Magazines' third weird menace pulp, and it was no more successful than its predecessors, Ace Mystery and Eerie Stories. As with Eerie Stories, the contents were all pseudonymous, and some were reprints from Ace Mystery or Ten Detective Aces, another Ace Magazines title, where the original detective story had enough violence to be a suitable candidate. The magazine's tagline was "10 Complete Horror-Thrillers", and the reprints had their titles changed to suit the new magazine, but the new titles, such as "When It Rained Corpses" by Ralph Powers, or "Skull and Double Cross-Bones" by Eric Lennon, stressed sex less than earlier weird menace magazines had done, and pulp historian Peter Haining cites Eerie Mysteries as an example of a magazine attempting to cash in on a trend that was already starting to fade away. Haining adds that the contents were also tamer than usual: "descriptions of beautiful females being molested and tortured were notably fewer". All four covers were painted by Norman Saunders, and Haining suggests that some or all of the interior art was re-used from other Ace Magazines titles.

== Bibliographic details ==
Eerie Mysteries published four issues from August/September 1938 to April/May 1939, in one volume of four issues. It was published by Ace Magazines of New York, and edited by Harry Widmer. It was pulp format, 128 pages, and priced at 15 cents.

== Sources ==
- Ashley, Mike (1985a). "Eerie Mysteries". In Tymn, Marshall B.; Ashley, Mike (eds.). Science Fiction, Fantasy and Weird Fiction Magazines. Westport, Connecticut: Greenwood Press. pp. 201–202. ISBN 0-3132-1221-X.
- Ashley, Mike (1985b). "Eerie Stories". In Tymn, Marshall B.; Ashley, Mike (eds.). Science Fiction, Fantasy and Weird Fiction Magazines. Westport, Connecticut: Greenwood Press. pp. 202–203. ISBN 0-3132-1221-X.
- Cook, Michael L. (1983). "Eerie Mysteries". In Cook, Michael L. (ed.). Mystery, Detective, and Espionage Magazines. Westport, Connecticut: Greenwood Press. pp. 213–214. ISBN 0-313-23310-1.
- Haining, Peter (2000). The Classic Era of American Pulp Magazines. Chicago: Chicago Review Press. ISBN 1-55652-389-0.
- Jones, Robert Kenneth (1975). The Shudder Pulps. West Linn, Oregon: FAX Collector's Editions. ISBN 0-913960-04-7.
