= Timeline of the Black Donnellys =

The "Black" Donnellys were an Irish immigrant family who settled in Biddulph township, Upper Canada in the 19th century. The family became involved in a series of personal and business disputes which frequently escalated to violence, culminating in the 1880 burning of the family home by an armed vigilante mob, resulting in the deaths of five family members.

The following is a timeline of key events in the lives of the family.

== Timeline ==
=== Early events ===
- 1840: James Donnelly marries Johannah Magee in Ireland.
- 1841: James and Johannah Donnelly's first son, James Jr, is born in Moneygall, Co Tipperary.
- 1842: James and Johannah sail to Upper Canada. James may have arrived first, followed by Johannah.
- 1844: William is born in Upper Canada.
- 1845: The family builds a home on Lot 18, Concession 6 in Biddulph, a lot owned by John Grace.
- 1847: John Donnelly is born in Upper Canada.
- 1849: Patrick Donnelly is born in Upper Canada.
- 1850: Michael Donnelly is born in Upper Canada.
- 1853: Robert Donnelly is born in Upper Canada.
- 1854: Thomas Donnelly is born in Upper Canada.
- 1855: John Grace sells the southern 50 acres of Lot 18, Concession 6 to Michael Maher for £200. However, the Donnelly family was still living on the land.
- 1855: Not long after the sale of the land that the Donnelly family lives on James Donnelly is charged with shooting at Patrick Farrell.
- 1856: John Grace applies to eject the Donnelly family from the northern half of Lot 18, Concession 6. Michael Maher does the same for the southern half of the property. In the end, however, Grace sells James Donnelly the NORTHERN half of the property for £50, far less than the £200 paid by Maher due to Donnelly's improvements on the land, but a reflection of the work the Donnellys had put into developing the lot.
- 1857: During a logging bee at a neighbour's farm James Donnelly Sr kills Patrick Farrell with a handspike. Donnelly goes into hiding and a $400 reward is offered for his capture.
  - (In the London Free Press account of that day it is reported that Patrick Farrell had attacked James Donnelly with his fists, James Donnelly defended himself with his fists and knocked Farrell down, then was walking away when Farrell picked up a logging handspike and attacked Donnelly from behind: Donnelly then defended himself with another handspike and Farrell was killed. This is why the hanging sentence was commuted on appeal, because the death was self defence. These things were well testified to at the original trial.)
- 1858: Jennie Donnelly is born in Upper Canada.
- 1858: James Donnelly Sr turns himself in and is convicted of the murder of Patrick Farrell and sentenced to death. His wife, Johannah, and others in the community petition for his sentence to be commuted. His sentence is reduced to seven years in Kingston Penitentiary.
- 1858: Johannah Donnelly takes out mortgages on the farm, but manages to keep the property. Part of the land is sold for a small fee for a schoolhouse for the children of Biddulph.
- 1865: James Donnelly Sr returns from Kingston Penitentiary.
- 1869: William Donnelly is charged with larceny by John Graham, but is acquitted.
- 1869: James Jr and William Donnelly are charged with robbing the post office in Granton. They are acquitted.
- 1870s: The Donnelly boys establish themselves in careers. James Jr moves to Michigan. Patrick trains in wagon/carriage making and marries Mary Ryan. John manages a saloon in Lucan and elopes, but the marriage lasts only a few months. Robert, Michael and Thomas farm on another property in Biddulph. William continues to help out on the Donnelly farm.
- 1871: The Donnelly boys begin to work for the stage line owned by McPhee and Keefe. The opposition stage line is managed by John Hawkshaw.
- 1873: William Donnelly decides to open his own stage line when McPhee folds. Brothers Michael, Robert and Thomas Donnelly also drive stages. They join forces with the Calder stage line. There are reports of sabotage of stages.
- 1873: William Donnelly asks Margaret Thompson to marry him. Her father, William Thompson, sends her away so that the marriage does not take place.
- 1874: After a series of letters from Margaret in which she asks William to come and get her, William Donnelly and friends search the Thompson household and the homes of neighbour Ellen Fogarty and William Thompson Jr. looking for Margaret. The group is charged with trespassing, but acquitted.
- 1874: Patrick Flanagan opens a rival stage line.
- 1874: Michael, James Jr. and Robert Donnelly are ejected from Lot 26, Concession 11. Joseph Carswell is granted the land, but once he takes possession, there are fires on the land and several of his animals die.
- 1875: William Donnelly marries Nora Kennedy. The marriage angers members of the Kennedy family, including brothers-in-law Rhody and John Kennedy.
- 1875: James Donnelly Jr. is charged with stealing from and assaulting Thomas Gibbs, a fruit vendor. He is convicted of the assault charge, but not the theft charge.
- 1875: One of Flanagan's stages is destroyed and stage driver William Brooks is killed when a wheel falls off. Sabotage is suspected. Robert McLeod, who works for Flanagan, cuts off the Donnelly stage, causing passengers to fall out of the carriage; Donnelly charges him and receives damages. Louisa and Martha Lindsay charge the Donnellys for dumping them out of the stage and the Donnellys are forced to pay damages.
- 1875: Joseph Berryhill challenges James Keefe and the Donnellys to a fight. Keefe and the Donnellys are charged with assault, and Thomas Donnelly is convicted.
- 1875: James Curry claims that Keefe, James Jr and Thomas Donnelly attacked and robbed him. Nothing comes of the charge.
- 1875: Flanagan and Crawley's stables are burned. Late in the year Flanagan is beaten and another of his stages is burned. The Donnellys fight with Rhody Kennedy, who blames the Donnellys for the fire. The Donnellys are acquitted and Kennedy is charged with perjury.
- 1876: Peter McKellar has an altercation with the Donnellys. Michael Donnelly is convicted of threatening the life of McKellar. William Donnelly then charges McKellar with threatening him. Rhody Kennedy is sent to arrest Robert Donnelly and another fight ensues. McKellar charges William Donnelly with perjury.
- 1876: Hugh McKinnon, a private detective, arrives in Lucan. He goes to work with Constables John Bawden, John Coursey and John Reid. The constables go to Thomas Ryder's wedding to arrest the Donnellys for a variety of alleged crimes. A riot ensues and shots are fired. The Donnellys escape and a group of townspeople go in search of them. Many come forward to pursue old charges against the Donnellys. Constable Bawden captures Michael Donnelly and holds him in a Lucan hotel, but Michael manages to escape.
- 1876: Most of the charges against the Donnellys with regards to McKellar, Kennedy, and Esdale lead to no convictions. However, William and John Donnelly are convicted of the assault of Constable Bawden. William Donnelly is discharged from prison due to illness.
- 1877: Violence in Lucan increases. The Donnellys' stables and stages are burned, as is Michael Donnelly's home. The Donnellys are often blamed for crimes, but there is seldom proof that they are the culprits.
- 1877: James Donnelly Jr. dies of illness. Some suggest he might have been shot.
- 1878: The stage lines close due to the creation of the London, Huron and Bruce Railway.
- 1878: Troubles between James Carroll and the Donnelly family begin. Carroll charges them with assault and he charges Johannah Donnelly with using abusive language. The Donnellys accuse him of threatening to shoot them.
- 1878: Constable Samuel Everett claims someone fires a shot at him. He says the guilty party is Robert Donnelly, and Robert is sentenced to two years in the Kingston Penitentiary.
- 1879: Constable Everett is convicted of assaulting William Hodgins, another constable. Everett confesses that he is not certain that it was Robert Donnelly who shot him.
- 1879: Father John Connolly arrives at St Patrick's Catholic Church in Biddulph. He hears stories about the 'troublesome' Donnelly family and forms a prejudice before meeting them. William Donnelly writes to him complaining that he is unfair to the Donnelly family.
- 1879: In June Father Connolly founds a "Peace Society" and asks people in the community to pledge their support, and to agree to have their homes searched for stolen property. The Donnellys do not sign the pledge.
- 1879: In August a splinter group of the Peace Society begins meeting at the Cedar Swamp Schoolhouse in Biddulph. James Carroll is part of the group, as are many of the Donnellys' neighbours. This group becomes known as the Vigilance Society.
- 1879: Not long after the creation of the Vigilance Society, a cow disappears from Mary and William Thompson's farm. The Vigilance Society, including James Carroll, searches the Donnelly farm for the cow. The cow is later found at home. The Donnellys accuse the group of trespassing.
- 1879: James Carroll is made a constable. He promises to rid the township of the Donnellys. Carroll goes to William Donnelly's home to arrest Thomas on old charges, but Thomas is at his parents' homestead. William goes to warn Thomas, and John helps Thomas escape. The Vigilance Society and Carroll search for Thomas. John is charged with aiding Thomas’ escape and is later charged with perjury; he is acquitted.
- 1879: Carroll and the Vigilance Society foment a hate campaign against the Donnellys. Some neighbours become nervous of associating with the Donnellys.
- 1879: Michael Donnelly, who has moved to St Thomas to work for the railway, goes to Waterford in the course of his work, and is stabbed to death by William Lewis. Lewis is convicted of manslaughter and sent to the Kingston Penitentiary.
- 1880: Robert Donnelly returns from serving his sentence for allegedly shooting at Constable Everett.
- 1880: On January 15 Patrick Ryder's barn burns down. That night, Thomas, John and William Donnelly are at a wedding, so the Vigilance Society blames James Sr and Johannah Donnelly for the fire.
- 1880: James Donnelly complains that the Donnellys are unfairly blamed for everything.

=== Massacre ===
- February 3, 1880: The Vigilance Society holds a meeting in the Cedar Swamp Schoolhouse. They speak to James Feeheley and ask him to spy on the Donnellys later that night.
- February 3, 1880: The Donnelly family prepare to attend their trial over the burning of the Ryder barn, to be held in Granton the next day. Johnny O'Connor, a 15 year old boy from a family friendly to the Donnellys helps with chores on their farm.
- February 3, 1880: John Donnelly leaves the family farm and goes to William Donnelly's home in Whalen's Corners to borrow a sleigh to take the family to court the next day. He decides to spend the night at William's home, along with his friend Martin Hogan Sr. Back at the Donnelly homestead, Thomas, Johannah and James Sr Donnelly, James's niece Bridget from Ireland, and Jonny O'Connor, prepare for sleep.
- February 3, 1880: James Sr and retire to the bedroom at the front of the house. James Feeheley arrives and talks to Thomas, Bridget and Johannah. When he leaves, Thomas retires to the bedroom off the back kitchen. Bridget and Johannah sleep together in the next room to James Sr's at the front of the house.
- Shortly before midnight, February 3, 1880: The Vigilance Society gathers at the Cedar Swamp Schoolhouse. They go to one of the farms owned by Patrick Ryder.
- Shortly after midnight, February 4, 1880: John and William Donnelly and Martin Hogan go to bed at William's place. Nora Donnelly is already asleep. John and Hogan share one room, and William and Nora another.
- Shortly after 1:00 a.m., February 4, 1880: The Vigilance Society proceeds to the Donnelly homestead. Carroll allegedly enters the home first via the back kitchen door, and handcuffs Thomas Donnelly. Bridget and Johannah awake and start a fire. Carroll goes to the front room and wakes James Sr, and Johnny passes James Sr his coat. The mob quickly enters the home and attacks James Sr and Johannah Donnelly. Johnny O'Connor takes cover under the bed and watches the violent scene. Johnny then follows Bridget and runs upstairs, but she shuts the door so is unable to follow her. Johnny returns to his hiding place under the bed. Johnny later says he saw Thomas run outside, but Thomas was dragged back into the house. Johnny says that he saw some of the mob go upstairs to kill Bridget. The mob then spreads coal oil and sets fire to the cabin.
- 1:30 a.m., February 4, 1880: Johnny flees out the back door and goes to the home of Patrick Whalen. Johnny tells them about the murders and the fire and after some time they go back to the Donnelly cabin, which is in flames; Bridget's body falls through to the main level of the house. It snows for most of the night, and the snow covers the scene of the murders.
- 2:00 a.m., February 4, 1880: After killing Bridget, Thomas, Johannah and James Sr Donnelly, the Vigilance Society travels to William Donnelly's house at Whalen's Corners. The mob separates and surrounds the house. Members of the mob shout “Fire!” hoping to awaken William Donnelly. Instead, John Donnelly wakes and goes to the door. He is mistaken for William and is shot, allegedly by Martin McLaughlin and James Ryder. Hogan, Nora and William hide inside and see John die.
- Early morning of February 4, 1880: Neighbours come to view the burned Donnelly home and the remains of the murdered victims; some scavenge for souvenirs. The police arrive and put what remains of the bodies into one truck.

=== Trials ===
- Afternoon of February 4, 1880: Coroner Thomas Hossack gathers a jury to start hearing testimony at the coroner's inquest.
- February 5, 1880: James Carroll and 12 others are arrested for the murders of the Donnelly family.
- February 6, 1880: A funeral is held for James Sr, Johannah, Bridget, Thomas and John Donnelly. Father Connolly delivers a controversial funeral address and it is clear that the community is split over whether the death of the Donnellys is to be celebrated or mourned.
- February 11, 1880: The coroner's inquest is readjourned. They meet again on February 18 and March 2. They decide that the Donnellys were murdered by “persons unknown”.
  - Johnny O'Connor knew all the persons who did the killing and identified them easily, but his testimony was disregarded because of his age, which was somewhere between 11 and 15 years old.)
- February 21, 1880: A preliminary hearing is held from February 21 to March 13. Six prisoners (James Carroll, John Kennedy, Martin McLaughlin, Thomas Ryder, James Ryder and John Purtell) are committed for trial at the Spring Assizes. Two others, Patrick Ryder Jr. and William Carroll are allowed out on bail.
- April to May, 1880: Prosecutors, aware of the bias against the Donnellys, ask for a change of venue, but the judge refuses. In May, prosecutors appeal to the superior courts for a change of venue, but they also refuse to move the trial from London. Newspapers take sides in the conflict and the case is held over until the Fall Assizes.
- Summer of 1880: William Donnelly works tirelessly to gather evidence for the trial. There is trouble gathering a jury.
- October 4–9, 1880: The trial begins October 4 under Justice Armour. First on trial is James Carroll who is charged with the murder of Johannah Donnelly. The testimony heard is much the same as that at the inquest and preliminary hearing. Justice Armour issues a strong charge to the jury, but they cannot reach a verdict. Four of the jury want to convict, seven to acquit and one is undecided.
- November to December, 1880: Attorney General Mowat decides not to wait until spring for another trial to be held; he orders a special commission to oversee an earlier trial. He appoints two justices: Matthew Crooks Cameron and Featherstone Osler.
- January 24, 1881 to February 2, 1881: The second trial takes place. The jury finds Carroll not guilty of murder. The rest of the prisoners are granted bail and are never tried for the Donnelly murders.
- February, 1881: The surviving Donnellys befriend James and Michael Feeheley despite the actions of the Feeheleys on the night of the murders. James Feeheley confesses to Patrick Donnelly about the night of the Donnelly family murders, but he is afraid of the Vigilance Society.
- April, 1881: James and Michael Feeheley flee to Michigan.
- September, 1881: The Feeheleys, after being extradited to Canada, are charged with aiding and abetting the murder of Thomas Donnelly. The Crown agrees to set them free on bail, and the Vigilance Society pays the bail money. The Feeheleys refuse to testify against anyone so the chance of a third trial is diminished.

=== Life after the massacre ===
- 1882: William Donnelly goes to Ohio to work in the coal mines. Patrick Donnelly remains in the wagon-making business. Robert and Jennie Donnelly move to Glencoe where Robert owns a hauling business and Jennie is married to Constable James Currie.
- 1883: William Donnelly returns to Canada and joins Jennie and Robert in Glencoe. William decides to become a constable.
- 1885: The Salvation Army comes to Glencoe but Robert Donnelly does not like their methods of worship and behaviour. The barracks of the Salvation Army are burned and Robert is implicated.
- 1886: Robert Donnelly continues to harass the Salvation Army.
- 1888: William resigns as constable and moves to Appin to open a hotel.
- 1889: A large monument to commemorate the Donnellys is raised in St. Patrick's Cemetery.
- 1897: William Donnelly dies of natural causes.
- 1908: Robert Donnelly is admitted to the London Psychiatric Hospital.
- 1911: Robert Donnelly dies of natural causes.
- 1914: Patrick Donnelly dies of natural causes.
- 1916: Jennie Donnelly, the last member of the immediate Donnelly family, is laid to rest in Wardsville.
- 1964: Unwanted attention in the St Patrick's Cemetery where the Donnellys were laid to rest causes the large monument with the word “Murdered” to be replaced with a smaller tombstone.
- 2009: The Lucan Area Heritage & Donnelly Museum is established.
  - (Though the murderers were not convicted several of them died gruesome deaths in the following years .. one or two were in a carriage struck by a train not long after the trial, for instance. Others died of violence or particularly gruesome illnesses.)
