= Orlo Miller =

Canadian author

Henry Orlo Miller, sometimes listed at Hanson Orlo Miller (April 1, 1911, in London, Ontario – 1993) was a Canadian author, He gained fame under the name Orlo Miller for The Donnellys Must Die, a history of the Black Donnellys of Lucan, Ontario. In later life he was ordained a priest in the Anglican Diocese of Huron.

== Life ==
Miller was born on April 1, 1911, in London, Ontario, the son of Joseph Albert Miller, a merchant, and his wife Mary Della Barclay. His career began as a journalist with the London Free Press in 1932, and later worked with the CBC. He was ordained as an Anglican minister in 1964 at age 52. He served in Point Edward and Mitchell, Ontario. He wrote more than fifty plays, mostly for radio. He also produced for CFPL-FM.

He was considered to be a foremost expert on the Donnellys. Miller linked the Donnelly case to a feud started in Ireland. He expressed personal anger over the Donnelly story, calling it "an unexpunged blot on the Canadian judicial system." He believed that Canadian institutions could have taken steps to prevent the Biddulph tragedy. While The Donnellys Must Die was less sensationalistic than Thomas P. Kelley's earlier work, playwright Paul Thompson felt the book 'angelfied' the Donnellys. Miller also wrote a novelized account of the Donnellys called Death to the Donnellys. Miller's wife claimed they received over 30 threats concerning the Donnelly books.

Miller died in 1993.

== Bibliography ==
- The Donnellys Must Die 1962 Macmillan Company of Canada

Reprint Paperback Edition (1995) Stoddart Publishing Co. Ltd. ISBN 0-7715-9265-5

- Raiders of the Mohawk. The Story Of Butler's Rangers and The Golden Trail 1959
- The day-spring: The story of the unknown apostle to the Americas(1976) ISBN 978-0-7710-5864-6
- This was London : the first two centuries 1988, ISBN 978-0-921575-07-8
- Death to the Donnellys: A novel
- London 200, An Illustrated History
- Gargoyles and Gentlemen : A History of St. Paul's Cathedral, London,…
- Middlesex County
- Twenty mortal murders : bizarre murder cases from Canada's past
- Century of Western Ontario: Story of London, "The Free Press" and Western Ontario, 1849–1949 1973 ISBN 978-0-8371-6226-3
- Ship number 22 : her birth, life and death
- The Point : a history of the village of Point Edward (incorporated 1878) : from the earliest times to the present 1978
