= Uncanny Tales =

Uncanny Tales may refer to one of the following publications:

- Uncanny Tales (American pulp magazine), an American pulp magazine
- Uncanny Tales (Canadian pulp magazine), a Canadian pulp magazine
- Uncanny Tales (comic), a horror comic published by Atlas Comics in the 1950s
- Uncanny Tales (Sheckley), a 2003 collection of short stories by Robert Sheckley
