= Whelihan =

Whelihan is an Anglicized Irish surname. Notable people with the surname include:

- Craig Whelihan (born 1971), American football player
- James Austin Whelihan (1902–1986), Canadian priest
