= Thomas P. Kelley =

Canadian writer (1905–1982)

- Born: 6 April 1905; Hastings, Ontario, Canada
- Died: 14 February 1982 (aged 76); Toronto, Ontario, Canada
- Occupation: writer
- Writing career
- Genres: novels, history, true crime
- Notable work: The Black Donnellys

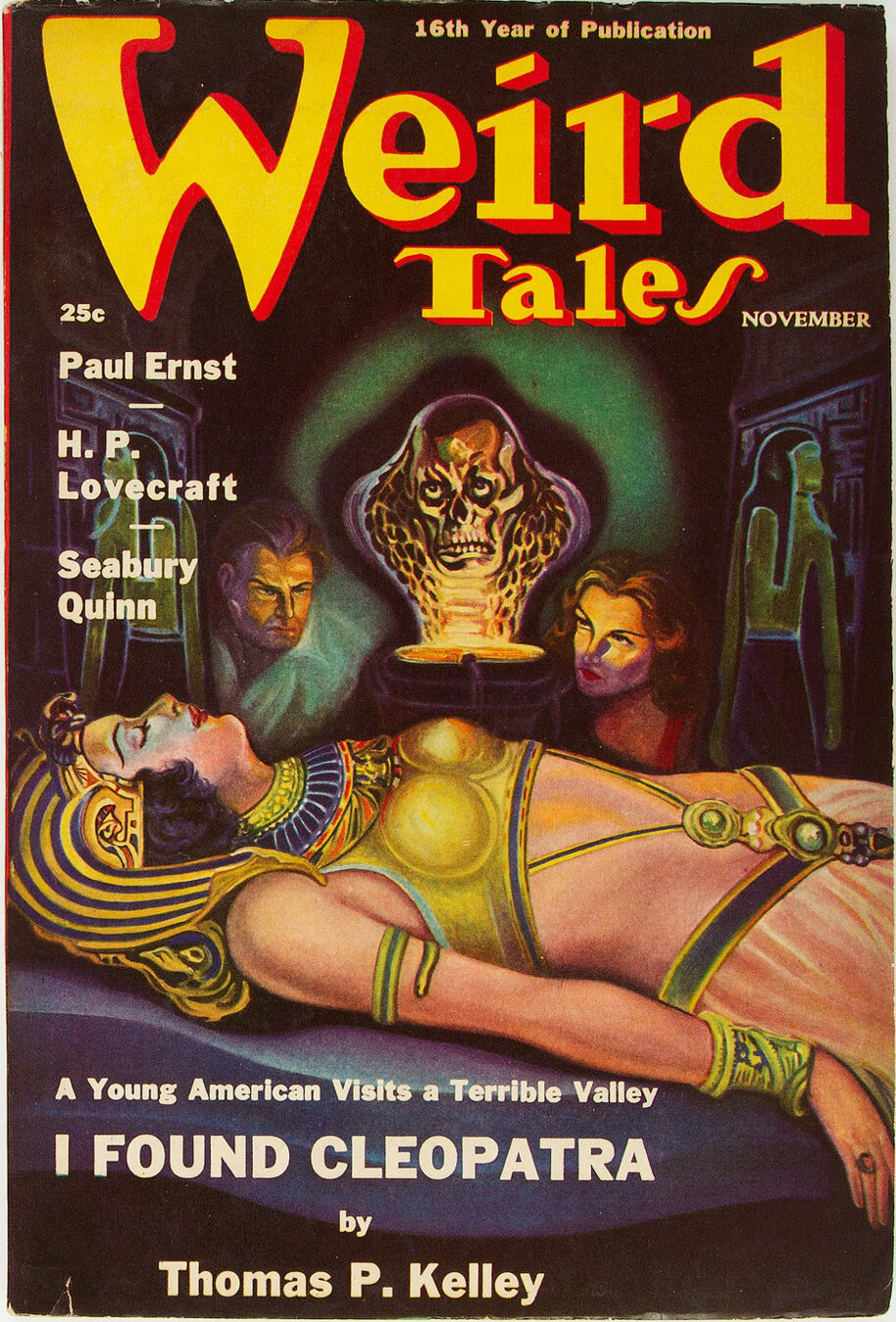
Kelley's novel I Found Cleopatra was serialized in Weird Tales.

Thomas Patrick Kelley Jr. (6 April 1905 – 14 February 1982) was a Canadian writer notable for two books on the infamous Black Donnellys of Lucan, Ontario.

== Early life ==
Kelley was born in Hastings, Ontario, the son of Thomas Patrick Kelley Sr. (John Lawrence Monahon) and English-born Nellie Burgess. He journeyed with his father's medicine show until 1931, then boxed professionally.

== Literary career ==
In 1937 he began his prolific pulp writing career, with a sale to Weird Tales. He wrote many stories for Uncanny Tales, a Canadian pulp magazine. He was the author of some two-dozen paperback books, largely of the true-crime variety. Kelley claimed to be "king of the Canadian pulp writers" and "the fastest author in the East".

Kelley claimed that when he began a novel he had no idea how it would end, and had used 30 pseudonyms.

He is most noted for his account of the Donnelly tragedy in The Black Donnellys. He later followed with the sequel Vengeance of The Black Donnellys, a fictionalized account of the vengeful vendetta undertaken by Francis Donnelly, one of the surviving members of the family on those responsible for the massacre of his parents and siblings.

The Black Donnellys is reputed to be the Harlequin book with the most printings, with 15 printings of two editions between April 1954 and April 1968. Another source states 400,000 copies in 22 editions were sold. However successful the books were, they were denounced as grossly inaccurate. James Reaney, citing Alfred Scott Garrett, states that Kelley "totally misportrayed Mr. and Mrs. James Donnelly”, effectively murdering them again. The book was described as "sensationalistic and not very factual".

Canada's False Prophet is purported to be a biography of the English mystic Brother XII by his brother Herbert Emmerson Wilson. Citing John Robert Colombo, the tale was likely "concocted" by Kelley and Herbert Emerson (single "m") Wilson. "Since this Wilson was born in Canada and Edward Arthur Wilson was born in England, there is hardly any likelihood there was a real connection between them." Thomas P. Kelley collaborated with the safecracker Herbert Emerson Wilson to produce his autobiography 'King of The Safecrackers', which was later titled, 'I Stole $16,000,000'. Interested in the story, Stanley Kubrick purchased the movie option, and after many years is now in development under the title God Fearing Man.

== Death ==
Kelley died in Toronto on 14 February 1982.
