= Macabre Cadaver =

Macabre Cadaver Magazine
- Issue 6 Jan/Feb 2009 Artwork created by George Cotronis.
- Editor: Emmanuel Paige
- Categories: Literature
- Frequency: Quarterly
- Publisher: Stark Raven Press, LLC.
- First issue: August 2008
- Final issue: Spring 2011
- Country: United States
- Language: American English, British English, Canadian English, Australian English
- Website: www.macabrecadaver.com
- ISSN: 1943-9296

Macabre Cadaver Magazine was an American online horror, fantasy and science fiction magazine. Macabre Cadaver published short fiction, poetry, and non-fiction articles. Macabre Cadaver Magazine was produced by Stark Raven Press and was available as an online webzine available in PDF and HTML format. Macabre Cadaver released only two print issues (#6 and #7) before placing print runs on indefinite hiatus on May 1, 2009. A final print issue (Spring 2011 Issue #10) was released before the online website was shuttered in May, 2011.

== Staff ==
- Emmanuel Paige, Publisher/Executive editor
- Jeff Woodward, Editor
- Tammy Kane, Staff Writer/Reader
- Richard Worden, Reader

== Former staff ==
- Angela Megl, Assistant to the editor
- Adam Blomquist, Staff Writer/Reader

== Authors interviewed ==
Interviews with novelists and writers, conducted by the editor of Macabre Cadaver, were regularly featured in the magazine. Noted authors interviewed included:

- John Saul
- Scott Nicholson
- Mort Castle
- Daniel P. Coughlin
- Andrea Dean Van Scoyoc

== Actors interviewed ==
Interviews with actors, conducted by the editor of Macabre Cadaver, were regularly featured in the magazine. Noted actors interviewed included:

- Debbie Rochon
- J. David Moeller
- Melissa Bacelar
- Tyler Mane
- Scarlet Salem

== Musicians interviewed ==
Interviews with musicians and band members, conducted by the editor of Macabre Cadaver, were regularly featured in the magazine. Noted musicians interviewed included:

- Otep
- The Creepshow
- Lady Parasyte
- John DeServio
- Chad Cherry of The Last Vegas
- Jason Hook of Five Finger Death Punch

== Reviews ==
Reviews of books, movies, theater, and music by the editor of Macabre Cadaver, were regularly featured in the magazine. Noted reviews included:

- WildClaw Theatre Company
- Just After Sunset by Stephen King

== Cover art ==
Issue 7 of Macabre Cadaver featured cover art by Clint Carney, an artist known for his violent art and also as a member of the electro-industrial music group System Syn.

== ISSN ==
Registered as ISSN 1943-9296 with the United States Library of Congress.

== See also ==
- Horror fiction magazine
- List of literary magazines
