= After 12,000 Years =

1929 novel by Stanton A. Coblentz

- Dust-jacket from the first edition
- Author: Stanton A. Coblentz
- Cover artist: Roy Hunt
- Language: English
- Genre: Science fiction
- Publisher: Fantasy Publishing Company, Inc.
- Publication date: 1950
- Publication place: United States
- Media type: Print (Hardback and Paperback)
- Pages: 184
- OCLC: 2625013

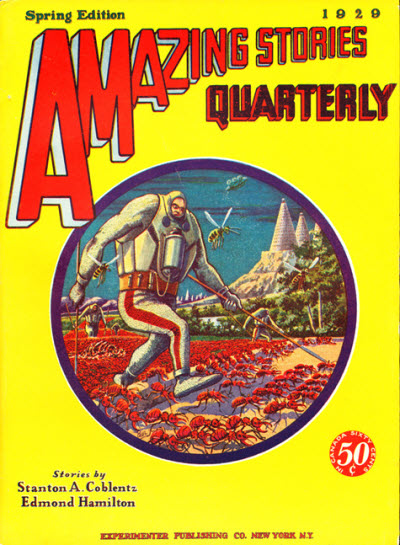
After 12,000 Years was originally published in the Spring 1929 issue of Amazing Stories Quarterly.

After 12,000 Years is a science fiction magazine serial and novel by American writer Stanton A. Coblentz. Considered one of the author's most bizarre and most interesting futuristic fantasies, the story originally appeared as a novella in the Spring 1929 issue of the magazine Amazing Stories Quarterly. It was later expanded and serialized for the pulp magazine Uncanny Tales in 1942, before being published in book form in 1950 by Fantasy Publishing Company, Inc. (FPCI). Lloyd Arthur Eshbach regarded this as one of the stronger titles published by FPCI. The story was abridged for the FPCI publication, in an edition of 1,000 copies, of which 750 were hardback. E. F. Bleiler considered the unabridged version to be superior.

== Plot ==
The novel concerns Henry Merwin, who after taking part in an experiment finds himself 12,000 years in the future. Taken captive by a giant race, he is forced to care for their insect pets. He falls in love with a fellow prisoner, Luellan, but his captors will not allow them to marry. Instead he is forced to go to war with his insect charges. The insects eventually grow to such a size that they take over much of the earth. Merwin returns to rescue Luellen, escaping to her home in Borneo.

== Critical reception ==
Groff Conklin of Galaxy Science Fiction said in 1951 that After 12,000 Years was "one of the most interesting and believable anti-Utopias of recent years". Despite sounding "much older" than its 1928 copyright "the ideas in the book are valid—more so today, I believe, than when the book was written", he said, comparing the future society's methods to that of Nineteen Eighty-Four and Adolf Hitler's Big lie. Conklin concluded, "Make no mistake—this is not one of science fiction's works of genius. But it is fresh and full of uncomfortable ideas about the future".

R. D. Mullen noted in 1975 that although the novel "anticipates Brave New World in some respects, and Nineteen Eighty-Four in others," its stylistic weakness makes it unsuccessful social satire, and that the novel therefore "fails to provoke either laughter or horror—or at least would fail to do so for any sophisticated reader." Bleiler described it as "essentially an attack on Western culture, militarism, and war hysteria," noting that "the description of the anthill society and many little touches describing sadistic exploitation are stronger than the plotline."

== Sources ==
- "The Book Shelf", Fantasy Book, 2 (1): 106, 1950
- Chalker, Jack L.; Mark Owings (1998). The Science-Fantasy Publishers: A Bibliographic History, 1923-1998. Westminster, MD and Baltimore: Mirage Press, Ltd. p. 270.
- Conklin, Groff (January 1951), "Galaxy's 5 Star Shelf", Galaxy Science Fiction, 1 (4): 137
- Crawford, Jr., Joseph H.; James J. Donahue; Donald M. Grant (1953). "333", A Bibliography of the Science-Fantasy Novel. Providence, RI: The Grandon Company. p. 20. OCLC 3924496.
- Pohl, Frederik (January 1951), "The Science Fictioneer", Super Science Stories, 7 (4): 47
- Tuck, Donald H. (1974). The Encyclopedia of Science Fiction and Fantasy. Chicago: Advent. p. 106. ISBN 0-911682-20-1.

== Bibliography ==
- Coblentz, Stanton Arthur (1975). After 12,000 years. Garland Pub. ISBN 0-8240-1404-9.
