= Harl Vincent =

American mechanical engineer and science fiction writer (1893–1968)

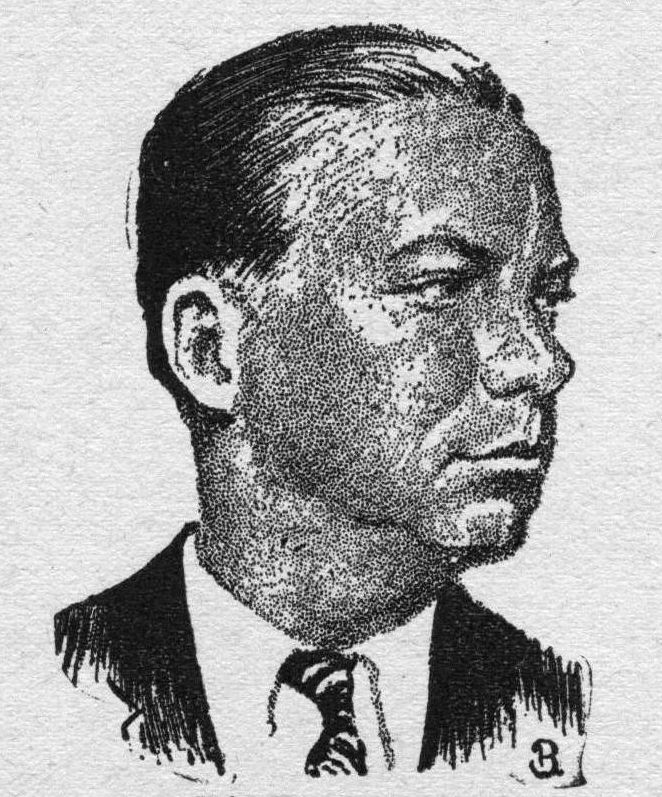
- Harl Vincent, as pictured in the September 1929 issue of Air Wonder Stories
- Born: Harold Vincent Schoepflin; October 19, 1893; Buffalo, New York, U.S.
- Died: May 5, 1968 (aged 74); Los Angeles, California, U.S.
- Occupations: Mechanical engineer and science fiction writer
- Spouse: Ruth Hoff
- Children: a son and a daughter
- Writing career
- Pen name: Harl Vincent
- Genre: Science fiction

Harl Vincent (October 19, 1893 – May 5, 1968) was the pen name of Harold Vincent Schoepflin, an American mechanical engineer and science-fiction writer. He was published regularly in science-fiction pulp magazines.

== Life and work ==
Vincent was born in Buffalo, New York, in 1893. He attended a technical high school, then enrolled in Rensselaer Polytechnic Institute. Vincent left RPI without completing his freshman year, in order to marry. He married Ruth Hoff, and they had two children, a son and a daughter. Vincent worked as a mechanical engineer for Westinghouse, specializing in the installation and testing of large electrical apparatus. Later he was employed as a sales engineer, becoming the manager of a local steam division.

Vincent's writing career began after he began reading Hugo Gernsback’s pioneering science-fiction magazine Amazing Stories. Vincent’s first published story, “The Golden Girl of Munan”, appeared in the June 1928 issue of the magazine. During the next fourteen years, Vincent published more than seventy science-fiction stories. Although most of his work appeared in the early science-fiction magazines, he published twice in the general fiction pulp magazine Argosy.

Although he ceased publishing during the early 1940s, Vincent remained involved with science fiction. After relocating to Los Angeles, Vincent joined the Los Angeles Science Fantasy Society and the Count Dracula Society, as well as attending local science-fiction conventions. Vincent resumed writing late in life, publishing the novel The Doomsday Planet in 1966 and the story “Invader” in the September 1967 issue of If.

Vincent died in Los Angeles on May 5, 1968, of emphysema and pneumonia complications.

== Works by Harl Vincent ==
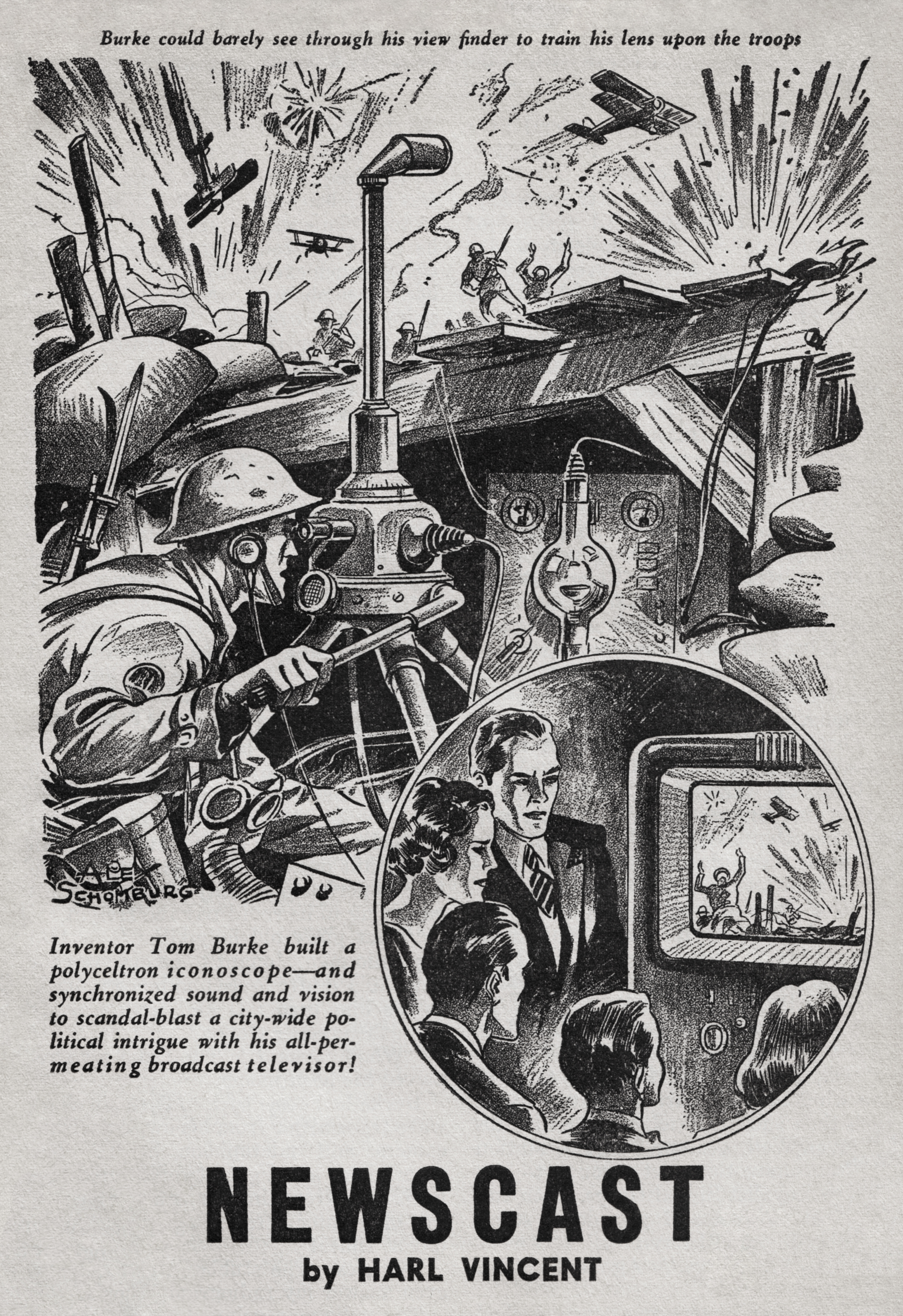
Illustration to Newscast in the April–May 1939 issue of Marvel Science Stories. Art by Alex Schomburg.

=== Series ===
==== Professor Nilsson ====
- "The Golden Girl of Munan", Amazing Stories, June 1928. Reprinted in Rainbow Fantasia, eds. Forrest J. Ackerman and Anne Hardin; Sense of Wonder Press, 2001.
- "The War of the Planets", Amazing Stories, January 1929.

==== Professor Timkin ====
- "Venus Liberated", Amazing Stories Quarterly, Summer 1929.
- "Faster Than Light", Amazing Stories Quarterly, Fall/Winter 1932.

==== Subterrania ====
- "The Menace from Below", Science Wonder Stories, July 1929.
- "The Return to Subterrania", Science Wonder Stories, April 1930.

==== Callisto ====
- "The Explorers of Callisto", Amazing Stories, February 1930.
- "Callisto at War", Amazing Stories, March 1930.

==== Carr Parker ====
- "Vagabonds of Space", Astounding Stories of Super-Science, November 1930. Reprinted in Harl Vincent Resurrected, ed. Greg Fowlkes; Resurrected Press, June 2011.
- "Creatures of Vibration", Astounding Stories, January 1932. Reprinted in Harl Vincent Resurrected.

==== Purple and Gray ====
- "Gray Denim", Astounding Stories of Super-Science, December 1930. Reprinted in Harl Vincent Resurrected.
- "Power", Amazing Stories, January 1932.
- "Master Control", Astonishing Stories, April 1940.

==== Ridge Coler ====
- "Water-Bound World", Amazing Stories Quarterly, Spring/Summer 1932.
- "When the Comet Returned", Amazing Stories, April 1933.
- "Lost City of Mars", Astounding Stories, February 1934.

==== Prowler ====
- "Prowler of the Wastelands", Astounding Stories, April 1935. Reprinted in Strange Signposts, eds. Roger Elwood and Sam Moskowitz; Holt, Rinehart and Winston, 1966.
- "Return of the Prowler", Astounding Science-Fiction, November 1938.

=== Non-series ===
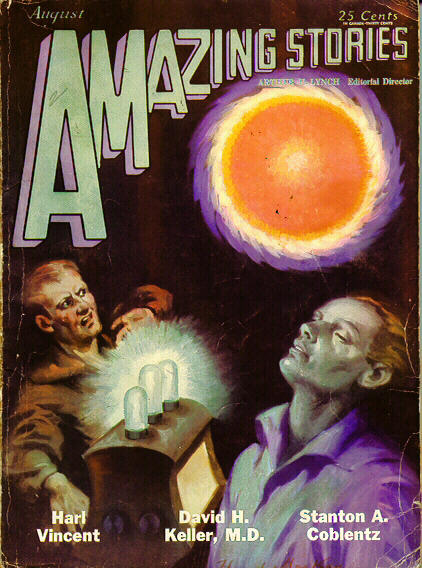
Vincent's novella "Barton's Island" was the cover story in the August 1929 issue of Amazing Stories

- "The Ambassador from Mars", Amazing Stories, September 1928.
- "The Seventh Generation", Amazing Stories Quarterly, Winter 1929.
- "Barton's Island", Amazing Stories, August 1929.
- "The Yellow Air-Peril", Air Wonder Stories, September 1929.
- "Through the Air Tunnel", Air Wonder Stories, October 1929.
- "Microcosmic Buccaneers", Amazing Stories, November 1929.
- "The Colloidal Menace", Amazing Stories, December 1929.
- "Old Crompton's Secret", Astounding Stories of Super-Science, February 1930. Reprinted in Harl Vincent Resurrected.
- "Before the Asteroids", Science Wonder Stories, March 1930.
- "The Terror of Air-Level Six", Astounding Stories of Super-Science, July 1930. Reprinted in Harl Vincent Resurrected.
- "Silver Dome", Astounding Stories of Super-Science, August 1930. Reprinted in Harl Vincent Resurrected.
- "Free Energy", Amazing Stories, September 1930.
- "Tanks Under the Sea", Amazing Stories, January 1931.
- "Terrors Unseen", Astounding Stories, March 1931. Reprinted in Harl Vincent Resurrected.
- "Invisible Ships", Amazing Stories Quarterly, Spring 1931.
- "Too Many Boards", Amazing Stories, April 1931.
- "Beyond the Dark Nebula", Argosy, April 4, 1931.
- "The Moon Weed", Astounding Stories, August 1931. Reprinted in Harl Vincent Resurrected.
- "The Copper-Clad World", Astounding Stories, September 1931. Reprinted in Harl Vincent Resurrected.
- “Red Twilight”, Argosy, September 13–27, 1931. Reprinted in Red Twilight/World's End; Starmont, 1991.
- "A Matter of Ethics", Amazing Stories, October 1931.
- "Sky Cops" (with Charles Roy Cox), Amazing Stories, December 1931.
- "Once in a Blue Moon", Amazing Stories Quarterly, Winter 1932. Reprinted in Rainbow Fantasia.
- "Vulcan's Workshop", Astounding Stories, June 1932. Reprinted in Harl Vincent Resurrected.
- "Thia of the Drylands", Amazing Stories, July 1932.
- "Roadways of Mars", Amazing Stories, December 1932.
- "Wanderer of Infinity", Astounding Stories, March 1933. Reprinted in The Pulps: Fifty Years of American Pop Culture, ed. Tony Goodstone; Chelsea House, 1976; Harl Vincent Resurrected.
- "Cavern of Thunders", Amazing Stories, July 1933.
- "Whisper of Death", Amazing Stories, November 1933.
- "Telegraph Plateau", Astounding Stories, November 1933.
- "Master of Dreams", Amazing Stories, January 1934.
- "Cat's Eye", Amazing Stories, April 1934.
- “Rex” Astounding Stories, June 1934. Reprinted in The Coming of the Robots, ed. Sam Moskowitz; Collier Books, 1963; Machines that Think, eds. Isaac Asimov, Patricia S. Warrick, and Martin H. Greenberg; Holt, Rinehart and Winston, January 1984; and The Monster Book of Monsters, ed. Michael O'Shaughnessy; Crescent Books, June 1988.
- "Synthetic", Marvel Tales, July/August 1934.
- "The Barrier", Amazing Stories, September 1934.
- "Cosmic Rhythm", Astounding Stories, October 1934.
- "Energy", Astounding Stories, January 1935.
- "Valley of the Rukh", Amazing Stories, February 1935.
- "The Plane Compass", Astounding Stories, June 1935.
- "Parasite", Amazing Stories, July 1935.
- "The Challenge from Beyond" (with Stanley G. Weinbaum, Donald Wandrei, E. E. Smith, and Murray Leinster), Fantasy Magazine, September 1935.
- "Prince Deru Returns", Amazing Stories, December 1938.
- "Newscast", Marvel Science Stories, April/May 1939.
- "The Devil Flower", Fantastic Adventures, May 1939.
- "The Morons", Astounding Science-Fiction, June 1939.
- "Mystery of the Collapsing Skyscrapers", Amazing Stories, August 1939.
- "Lightning Strikes Once", Marvel Science Stories, August 1939.
- "Power Plant", Astounding Science-Fiction, November 1939.
- "Condenser Pit Murder", Detective Fiction Weekly, December 23, 1939.
- "Neutral Vessel", Astounding Science-Fiction, January 1940.
- "High-Frequency War", Astounding Science-Fiction, February 1940.
- "Undersea Prisoner", Amazing Stories, February 1940.
- "Gravity Island", Super Science Stories, March 1940.
- "The Stool at the Bar", Thrilling Detective, March 1940.
- "Terror in Niagara", Thrilling Spy Stories, Spring 1940.
- "Deputy Correspondent", Astounding Science-Fiction, June 1940.
- "Alibi Mike", Detective Novels Magazine, June 1940.
- "Life Inside a Wall", Science Fiction Quarterly, Summer 1940. Reprinted in The Moon Conquerors; Swan, 1943.
- "Trouble Shooter", Super Science Stories, July 1940.
- "Other World", Astonishing Stories, October 1940.
- "Grave of the Achilles", Captain Future, Winter 1941.
- "Lunar Station", Comet Stories, January 1941.
- "Crime by Chart", Exciting Detective, March 1941.
- "Voice from the Void", Amazing Stories, June 1942.
- "Invader", If, September 1967.
- "The Lethal Planetoid", Spaceway, January 1969.
- "Space Storm", Famous Science Fiction, Spring 1969.

=== Novels ===
- The Doomsday Planet, Tower Publishing, 1966.

=== Collections ===
- Harl Vincent Resurrected, ed. Greg Fowlkes; Resurrected Press, June 2011.
