= James Austin Whelihan =

Canadian priest (1902–1986)

James Austin Whelihan CM
- Born: April 6, 1902; Lucan, Ontario, Canada
- Died: November 15, 1986 (aged 84); Toronto, Ontario, Canada
- Education: University of Western Ontario
- Occupations: Priest, educator, athletic director
- Known for: Recipient of the Order of Canada (1985)
- Awards: Order of Canada; Alberta Sports Hall of Fame

James Austin Whelihan, CM (April 6, 1902 – November 15, 1986) was a priest who received the Order of Canada in 1985.

== Biography ==
Born in Lucan, Ontario, James Austin Whelihan studied at the University of Western Ontario where he earned a Bachelor of Arts with honours. He then joined the Congregation of St. Basil and became a priest on December 21, 1930. Whelihan taught in the United States and Ontario before teaching at St. Mary's High School in Calgary, Alberta. He served as vice-principal, athletic coach and teacher. He later became the director of athletics for the Calgary Catholic School District. Whelihan died in Toronto, Ontario at St. Michael's Hospital, November 15, 1986. He is buried at the St. Mary's Cemetery in Calgary, Alberta. An elementary/junior high school in Calgary is named for him.

== Awards ==
- Alberta Sports Hall of Fame inductee
- Order of Canada
