= Uncanny Tales (American pulp magazine) =

American magazine published from 1939 to 1940

May 1940 cover of the magazine

Uncanny Tales was an American weird menace pulp magazine that ran from April 1939 to May 1940. Published by Martin Goodman under the "Manvis Publications, Inc." imprint. It should not be confused with Goodman's "shudder" publication Uncanny Stories.

The magazine was based in Chicago.

== See also ==
- List of defunct American periodicals
