= Marvel Science Stories =

American pulp science fiction magazine

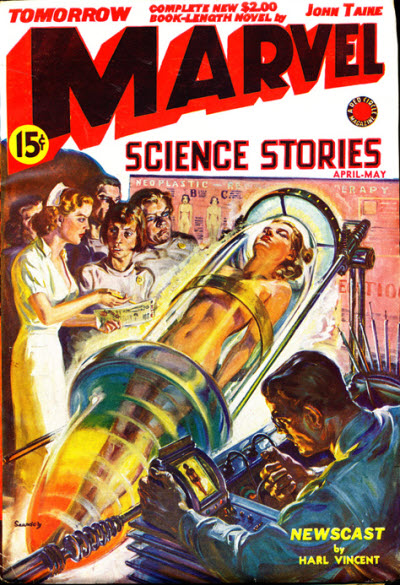
Cover of the April–May 1939 issue; artwork by Norman Saunders

Marvel Science Stories was an American pulp magazine that ran for a total of fifteen issues in two separate runs, both edited by Robert O. Erisman. The publisher for the first run was Postal Publications, and the second run was published by Western Publishing; both companies were owned by Abraham and Martin Goodman. The first issue was dated August 1938, and carried stories with more sexual content than was usual for the genre, including several stories by Henry Kuttner, under his own name and also under pseudonyms. Reaction was generally negative, with one reader referring to Kuttner's story "The Time Trap" as "trash". This was the first of several titles featuring the word "Marvel", and Marvel Comics came from the same stable in the following year.

The magazine was canceled after the April 1941 issue, but when a boom in science fiction magazines began in 1950, the publishers revived it. The first issue of the new series was dated November 1950; a further six issues appeared, the last dated May 1952. In addition to Kuttner, contributors to the first run included Arthur J. Burks and Jack Williamson; the second run published stories by Arthur C. Clarke, Isaac Asimov, Jack Vance, and L. Sprague de Camp, among others. In the opinion of science fiction historian Joseph Marchesani, the quality of the second incarnation of the magazine was superior to the first, but it was unable to compete with the new higher-quality magazines that had appeared in the interim.

== Publication history ==
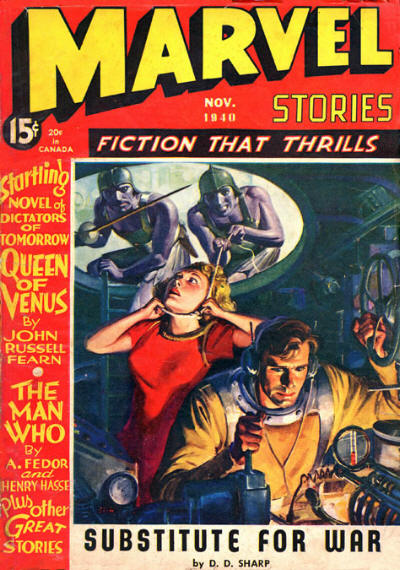
Cover of the November 1940 issue, art by J. W. Scott

Although science fiction (sf) had been published before the 1920s, it did not begin to coalesce into a separately marketed genre until the appearance in 1926 of Amazing Stories, a pulp magazine published by Hugo Gernsback. After 1931, when Miracle Science and Fantasy Stories was launched, no new sf magazines appeared for several years. In 1936 Abraham and Martin Goodman, two brothers who owned a publishing company with multiple imprints, launched Ka-Zar, an imitation Tarzan magazine with some borderline sf content. It lasted for three issues, with the last issue dated January 1937. In addition to this marginal sf magazine, in 1937 the Goodmans began publishing several "weird-menace" pulps. These were a genre of pulp magazine known for incorporating "sex and sadism", with storylines that placed women in danger, usually because of a threat that appeared to be supernatural but was ultimately revealed to be the work of a human villain. The Goodmans' titles were Detective Short Stories, launched in August 1937, and Mystery Tales, which published its first issue in March 1938. These were followed up by Marvel Science Stories, edited by Robert O. Erisman, which was not intended to be a weird-menace pulp, but rather an sf magazine. The influence of the "sex and sadism" side of the Goodman's portfolio of magazines was apparent, however: authors were sometimes asked to add more sex to their stories than was usual in sf at the time. This was the first time that the word "Marvel" was used in the title of a Goodman publication. It went on to be used in other titles, notably Marvel Comics in the following year. The word may have been chosen to appeal to advertisers Marvel Home Utilities and Marvel Mystery Oil, or it may have been that Martin Goodman liked the name because it was similar to his own.

The first issue, dated August 1938, appeared on newsstands in May of that year. It contained "Survival" by Arthur J. Burks as the lead novel; this was well received by the readers, and did not contain any sexual content. The first couple of issues contained several stories that did little to offend readers, but they also contained two stories by Henry Kuttner, who was selling regularly to the Goodmans' other publications. Erisman and the Goodmans had asked Kuttner to spice up his submissions to Marvel Science Stories. He obliged with "Avengers of Space" in the first issue, which included "scenes of aliens lusting after unclothed Earth women", in the words of sf historian Mike Ashley, and "The Time Trap" in the second issue. Reader reaction was strongly negative: a typical letter, from William Hamling, later to become a publisher and editor of science fiction magazines in his own right, commented: "I was just about to write you a letter of complete congratulations when my eyes fell upon Kuttner's "The Time Trap". All I can say is: PLEASE, in the future, dislodge such trash from your magazine". In addition to these two stories published under Kuttner's name, there were two more stories in the same two issues by him (under pseudonyms) which were equally offensive to readers such as Hamling.

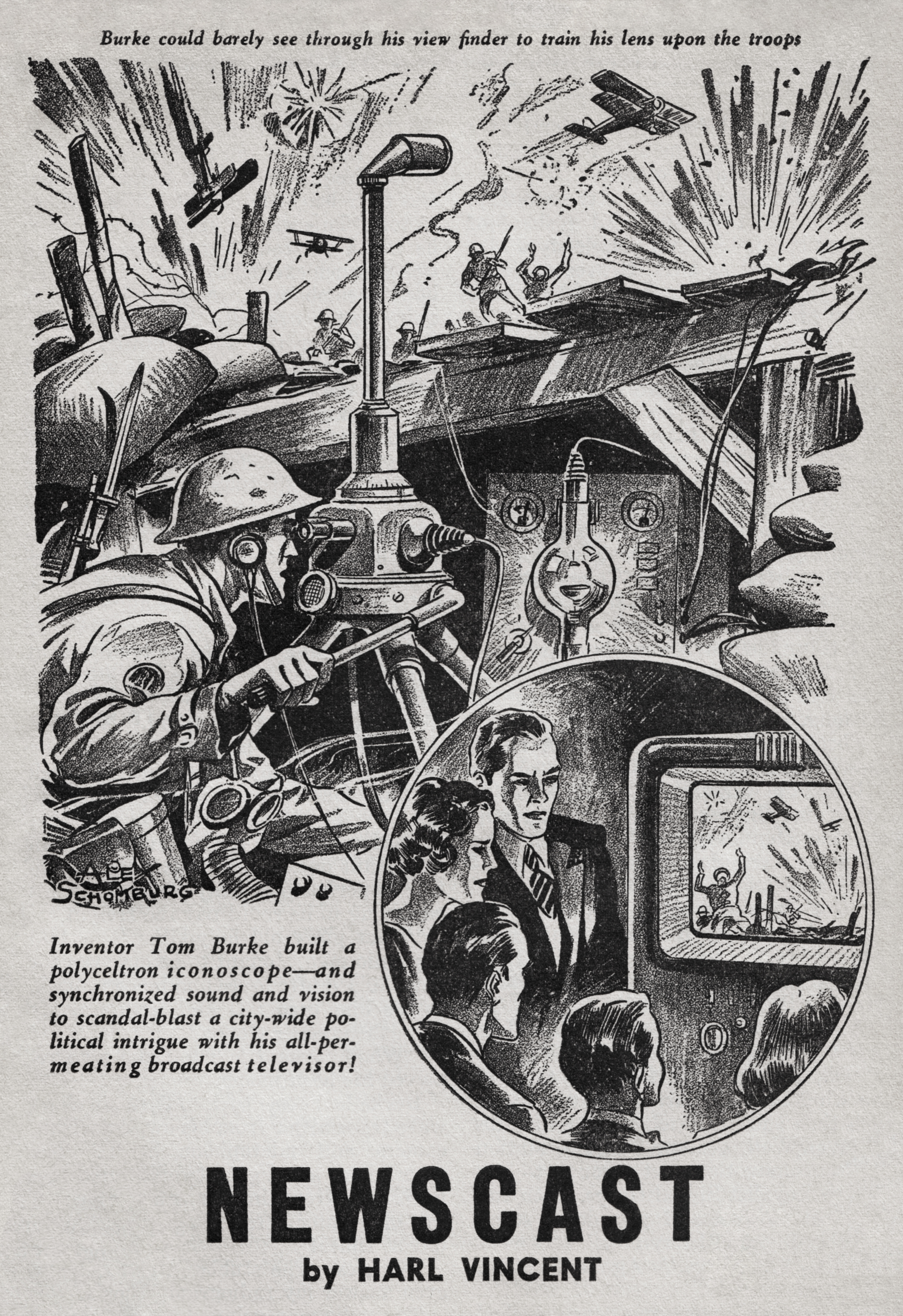
Illustration for Harl Vincent's "Newscast" in the May 1939 issue

After five issues, the title was changed to Marvel Tales; at the same time, the number of stories advertised as "passionate" or containing "sin-lost" or "lust-crazed" characters sharply increased. Though some stories contained little to match the titillating blurbs, others did, with "women entrapped, burned and otherwise maltreated, and whips cracking into use with uninventive frequency", according to sf historian Joseph Marchesani. While women with large breasts often appeared on pulp magazine covers, Marvel's content was unusually explicit. Isaac Asimov wrote in 1969 of how in "1938-39 ... for some half a dozen issues or so, a magazine I won't name" published "spicy" stories about "the hot passion of alien monsters for Earthwomen. Clothes were always getting ripped off and breasts were described in a variety of elliptical phrases" for its "few readers" before "the magazine died a deserved death".

The magazine ceased publication with the April 1941 issue, but in 1950 the Goodmans saw an opportunity to revive it when a new boom in science fiction magazines got under way. Erisman was still working for the Goodmans, and was listed as editorial director of the new version of the magazine, but much of the editorial work was done by Daniel Keyes, who was credited as "Editorial Associate" on the 1951 issues. The first issue of the new incarnation of Marvel Science Stories was dated November 1950. After two issues Erisman switched the magazine to a digest format, but the final issue, dated May 1952, was once again a pulp. The post-war issues contained stories by well-known writers, including Arthur C. Clarke, Asimov, Richard Matheson, William Tenn, Jack Vance, and Lester del Rey, but the stories were of only average quality. In Marchesani's opinion, Erisman and Keyes were able to improve on the material published in the pre-war Marvel Tales, but the field had grown more sophisticated since those days, and the writers who sold to Marvel Tales were now publishing their best work elsewhere. William Knoles's 1960 Playboy article on the pulp era, "Girls of the Slime God", was, Asimov said, mostly based on Marvel.

== Bibliographic details ==
	Jan	Feb	Mar	Apr	May	Jun	Jul	Aug	Sep	Oct	Nov	Dec
1938								1/1			1/2	
1939		1/3		1/4				1/5				1/6
1940					2/1						2/2	
1941				2/3								
1950											3/1	
1951		3/2			3/3			3/4			3/5	
1952					3/6							
Issues of Marvel Science Stories, showing volume and issue numbers. The editor was Robert O. Erisman throughout.

There were nine issues in the first sequence, in one volume of six numbers and a second volume of three numbers. All issues in the first run were in pulp format and were priced at 15 cents. The first four issues were 128 pages; the next five were 112 pages. The title was Marvel Science Stories for five issues, then Marvel Tales for two issues, and then Marvel Stories for the last two issues of the first run. The publisher for the first series was listed as Postal Publications of Chicago for the first four issues, and as Western Publishing of New York and Chicago; in both cases the owner was Martin and Abraham Goodman. The intended schedule was bimonthly but this was never achieved. The editor was Robert O. Erisman. The second incarnation of the magazine lasted for six issues on a more regular quarterly schedule, starting in November 1950. The price was 25 cents and the page count was 128 pages for all six issues; the first two issues and last issue of this sequence were in pulp format, and the three from May 1951 to November 1951 were in digest format. The title returned to Marvel Science Stories for the first three issues of this series, and changed to Marvel Science Fiction for the last three issues. The publisher was listed as Stadium Publishing of New York; as with the first series, Martin and Abraham Goodman were the owners.

There was a British reprint of the February 1951 issue, published by Thorpe & Porter and dated May 1951. Science fiction bibliographer Brad Day lists five other British reprints of the second series of Marvel Science Stories, but no copies are recorded by more recent bibliographers. In 1977 the Goodmans launched a digest science fiction magazine titled Skyworlds, which has been described by Mike Ashley as "without any shadow of a doubt, the worst" of the 1970s crop of science fiction magazines; the fiction it contained was almost entirely reprinted from the second series of Marvel Science Stories.

== Sources ==
- Ashley, Mike (1985). "Skyworlds". In Tymn, Marshall B.; Ashley, Mike (eds.). Science Fiction, Fantasy, and Weird Fiction Magazines. Westport CT: Greenwood Press. pp. 577–579. ISBN 0-313-21221-X.
- Ashley, Mike (2000). The Time Machines:The Story of the Science-Fiction Pulp Magazines from the beginning to 1950. Liverpool: Liverpool University Press. ISBN 0-85323-865-0.
- Ashley, Mike (2005). Transformations. Liverpool: Liverpool University Press. ISBN 0-85323-779-4.
- Bell, Blake; Vassallo, Michael J. (2013). The Secret History of Marvel Comics: Jack Kirby and the Moonlighting Artists at Martin Goodman's Empire. Fantagraphics Books. ISBN 978-1-60699-552-5.
- Edwards, Malcolm; Nicholls, Peter (1993). "SF Magazines". In Clute, John; Nicholls, Peter (eds.). Encyclopedia of Science Fiction. New York: St. Martin's Press, Inc. ISBN 0-312-09618-6.
- Marchesani, Joseph (1985). "Marvel Science Stories". In Tymn, Marshall B.; Ashley, Mike (eds.). Science Fiction, Fantasy, and Weird Fiction Magazines. Westport CT: Greenwood Press. pp. 398–401. ISBN 0-313-21221-X.
