= Uncanny Stories (magazine) =

US pulp science fiction magazine

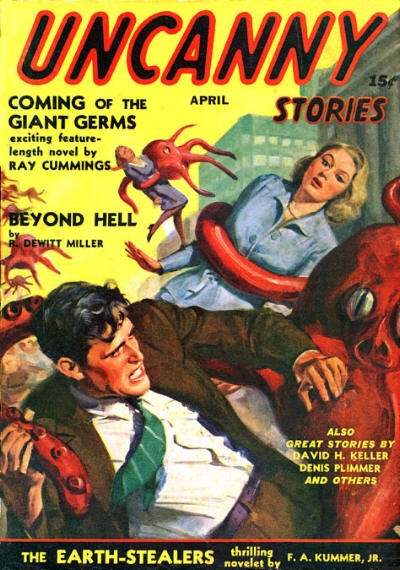
Cover of the only issue of Uncanny Stories, dated April 1941; art by J.W. Scott

Uncanny Stories was a pulp magazine which published a single issue, dated April 1941. It was published by Abraham and Martin Goodman, who were better known for "weird-menace" pulp magazines that included much more sex in the fiction than was usual in science fiction of that era. The Goodmans published Marvel Science Stories from 1938 to 1941, and Uncanny Stories appeared just as Marvel Science Stories ceased publication, perhaps in order to use up the material in inventory acquired by Marvel Science Stories. The fiction was poor quality; the lead story, Ray Cummings' "Coming of the Giant Germs", has been described as "one of his most appalling stories".

== Publication history ==
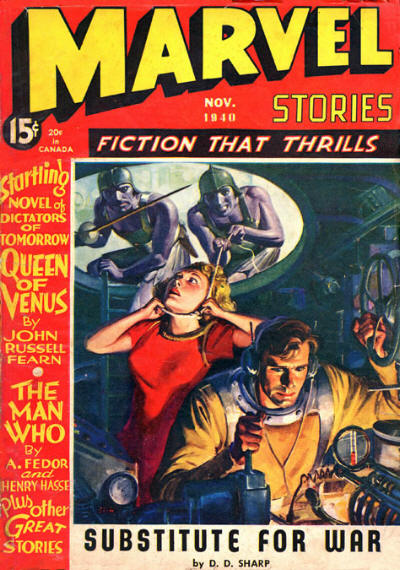
Cover of the November 1940 issue of Marvel Science Stories; art is by J.W. Scott

Although science fiction had been published before the 1920s, it did not begin to coalesce into a separately marketed genre until the appearance in 1926 of Amazing Stories, a pulp magazine published by Hugo Gernsback. After 1931, when Miracle Science and Fantasy Stories was launched, no new science fiction magazines appeared until August 1938, when Abraham and Martin Goodman, two brothers who owned a publishing company with multiple imprints, launched Marvel Science Stories. The Goodmans' magazines included several "weird-menace" pulps—a genre known for incorporating sex and sadism, with story lines that placed women in danger, usually because of a threat that appeared to be supernatural but was ultimately revealed to be the work of a human villain. The influence of the "sex and sadism" side of the Goodman's portfolio of magazines was apparent in Marvel Science Stories: it was not strictly a weird-menace pulp, but authors were sometimes asked to add more sex to their stories than was usual in the science fiction field at the time.

Marvel Science Stories ceased publication with its April 1941 issue, and the Goodmans brought out the only issue of Uncanny Stories the same month. Like Marvel Science Stories, it was edited by Robert O. Erisman. The quality of the fiction was very poor—sf historian Mike Ashley comments that Ray Cummings' lead story, "Coming of the Giant Germs", was "one of his most appalling stories". Ashley speculates that the only reason the magazine was issued was to use up some remaining material that had been acquired for Marvel Science Stories, perhaps because at this time the Goodmans were beginning to focus much more on the growing comic-book market.

In addition to Ray Cummings, contributors included David H. Keller, F.A. Kummer, R. DeWitt Miller, and Denis Plimmer. The story titles were not as strongly oriented towards sex as some of the other Goodman publications, which included titles such as "Blood-Brides of the Lusting Corpses", but Erisman did spice up some of the titles: for example, he changed Keller's story "The Chestnut Mare" to "Speed Will Be My Bride". Interior illustrators included Jack Kirby and Alex Schomburg.

== Bibliographic details ==
Uncanny Stories was in pulp format, 112 pages, and priced at 15 cents; the only issue was numbered volume 1, number 1. The publisher was Manvis Publications of New York; the editor was Robert O. Erisman.

== Sources ==
- Ashley, Mike; Weinberg, Robert (1985). "Uncanny Stories". In Tymn, Marshall B.; Ashley, Mike (eds.). Science Fiction, Fantasy, and Weird Fiction Magazines. Westport CT: Greenwood Press. pp. 683–684. ISBN 0-313-21221-X.
- Ashley, Mike (2000). The Time Machines:The Story of the Science-Fiction Pulp Magazines from the beginning to 1950. Liverpool: Liverpool University Press. ISBN 0-85323-865-0.
- Edwards, Malcolm; Nicholls, Peter (1993). "SF magazines". In Clute, John; Nicholls, Peter (eds.). The Encyclopedia of Science Fiction. New York: St. Martin's Press, Inc. ISBN 0-312-09618-6.
