= Uncanny Tales (Canadian pulp magazine) =

Canadian pulp science fiction magazine

- One of the logos used by Uncanny Tales, taken from the cover of issue 13 (January 1942)
- Editor: Melvin R. Colby
- Categories: Science fiction
- Format: digest; pulp
- Publisher: Adam Publishing Co.; Norman Book Co.
- Founded: 1940
- Final issue: 1943
- Country: Canada
- Based in: Toronto
- Language: English

Uncanny Tales was a Canadian weird fiction and science fiction pulp magazine edited by Melvin R. Colby that ran from November 1940 to September 1943. It was created in response to the wartime reduction of imports on British and American science fiction pulp magazines. Initially, it contained stories only from Canadian authors, with much of its contents supplied by Thomas P. Kelley. Within a few issues, Colby began to obtain reprint rights to American stories from Donald A. Wollheim and Sam Moskowitz. The later accounts of Wollheim and Moskowitz regarding the relationship with Colby differ. Moskowitz reported that he found out via an acquaintance of Wollheim's that Wollheim had persuaded Colby to stop buying Moskowitz's submissions. Paper shortages forced the magazine to shut down after less than three years. Copies are now extremely rare.

== Publication history and contents ==
Although science fiction had been published before the 1920s, it did not begin to coalesce into a separately marketed genre until the appearance in 1926 of Amazing Stories, a pulp magazine published by Hugo Gernsback. By the end of the 1930s the science-fiction magazine field was booming, with multiple new magazines launched in a short period. Most of the US publishers also printed versions of their magazines for the Canadian market, but with the outbreak of World War II, paper shortages and import restrictions reduced the availability of these magazines in Canada. Uncanny Tales was begun in response to these conditions; the editor was Melvin R. Colby, and the first issue was dated November 1940.

The first issue was digest-sized, and was printed in green ink. Colby initially focused on weird fiction, with Thomas P. Kelley, a Canadian writer whose work had appeared in Weird Tales, a prolific contributor. Kelley provided the entire contents of the first issue. For the first four issues the format remained unchanged, and almost all the stories were by Kelley or other Canadian writers. Colby subsequently began to obtain reprint rights to U.S. stories from both Donald A. Wollheim and Sam Moskowitz, though Wollheim's and Moskowitz's accounts of the events differ.

In Wollheim's account, he happened to meet Colby early in 1941 in New York; Wollheim had been editing Cosmic Stories and Stirring Science Stories but both magazines had ceased publication at the time of the meeting. Colby, who worked for a Toronto newspaper, told Wollheim that he was editing Uncanny Tales to make extra money, and asked if Wollheim knew where he might be able to obtain stories at a low word-rate. Since Stirring and Cosmic had never been distributed in Canada, Wollheim was able to offer him Canadian rights to the stories in those magazines, and Colby agreed to pay a quarter of a cent per word, a low rate compared to most American magazines. (Note: For comparison, Astounding Stories, by that time the leading science-fiction pulp magazine, was paying one cent per word, and occasionally more; lower-paying markets such as Super Science Stories, Astonishing Stories, and Science Fiction were paying half a cent per word.) According to Moskowitz, Wollheim heard rumours of the new magazine, perhaps via Nils Frome, a Canadian fan whom he knew. Wollheim obtained more details from Chester Cuthbert, a Canadian author he was in correspondence with, and contacted Colby to arrange reprints of stories from Stirring and Cosmic.

Moskowitz had also heard of Uncanny Tales and wrote to Colby separately, arranging reprints at a tenth of a cent per word. He sent Colby several stories, which were duly printed, but subsequent correspondence with Colby failed to elicit payment, and eventually Colby stopped responding to his letters. The manuscripts were never returned. A few months later, Moskowitz spoke to John B. Michel—an author associated with Wollheim's group of writers—and found out that a long-standing feud between Wollheim and Moskowitz was at least partly responsible for his problems. Wollheim and many of the group of writers he represented held very left-wing political positions; Moskowitz was strongly opposed, and Michel told Moskowitz that Colby was politically left-wing and had been put off by indications from Moskowitz that he was anti-communist. However, the main reason that Colby stopped responding, according to Michel, was that once Wollheim found out that Moskowitz was also supplying stories, he offered Colby further material for free on condition that Colby stopped accepting Moskowitz's submissions.

The first five issues were all original material, rather than reprints. (Note: David Ketterer, an academic and historian of science fiction, says the first six issues contained all original stories, but the sixth issue contained "The Thought Monsters" by Wollheim and Robert A. Lowndes, reprinted from the April 1941 issue of Stirring Science Stories.) The sixth issue saw a story by Wollheim appear, and in the seventh issue there were three by Wollheim and one by Robert W. Lowndes. In total, 37 stories from Uncanny Tales have been identified as reprints from either Stirring or Cosmic. There were also a handful of new stories from the same group of authors, including three by Wollheim and two by Lowndes, one of which, "Lure of the Lily", had been rejected by Wollheim for the American magazines for being too risqué. The stories supplied by Sam Moskowitz included his own "The Way Back" (reprinted from Comet), which appeared in the February 1942 issue; Stanton Coblentz's novel After 12,000 Years, which was serialized from April to September 1942; and James Taurasi's story "Magician of Space", which was not a reprint. Canadian writers continued to appear in the magazine, including C. V. Tench, who had sold a story to the first issue of Astounding Stories in January 1930. The stories of Canadian origin were generally unmemorable, according to science fiction historians Mike Ashley and Grant Thiessen, and in some cases the stories may have been plagiarized or rewritten versions of other works.

Paper shortages caused by the war forced the magazine to a bimonthly schedule in 1942, and only four more issues appeared. The last issue was dated September–October 1943. Over the lifetime of the magazine, its focus shifted from weird fiction to include both science fiction and fantasy. The magazine is now hard to find and complete runs are very rare.

== Bibliographic details ==
Issue data for Uncanny Tales, showing volume and issue number
	Jan	Feb	Mar	Apr	May	Jun	Jul	Aug	Sep	Oct	Nov	Dec
1940											1	2
1941	3		4		5	6	7	8	9	10	11	12
1942	13	14	15	16	17		18		19			20
1943									21			
All issues of Uncanny Tales, showing issue number. The editor was Melvin R. Colby throughout.

Uncanny Tales was published by Adam Publishing Co. of Toronto for the first 17 issues, and by Norman Book Co. of Toronto for the last four issues. The publisher may have been owned by Valentine, of the Toronto publishers Valentine, Koniac and Chamberlain. The editor, who was not credited in the magazine, was Melvin R. Colby. The first four issues were digest-sized and 64 pages long; the format then switched to a large pulp size with 96 pages for all the remaining issues except the last, which had 128 pages. The price was 15 cents ($3.08 in 2025) throughout except for the last issue, which was 25 cents. There was no volume numbering. A complete index by Dennis Lien of the contents of all issues can be found in issue 9 of Megavore, a science fiction and fantasy bibliography magazine.

In the early 1950s an anthology titled Brief Fantastic Tales appeared from Studio Publications in Toronto; it consisted mostly of reprints from Uncanny Tales, and despite the difference in the name of the publisher, it is likely that it came from the same editor and publishers as Uncanny Tales.

== Sources ==
- Ashley, Mike (2000). The Time Machines: The Story of the Science-Fiction Pulp Magazines from the beginning to 1950. Liverpool: Liverpool University Press. ISBN 0-85323-865-0.
- Ashley, Mike; Thiessen, Grant (1985). "Uncanny Tales (1940–1943)". In Tymn, Marshall B.; Ashley, Mike (eds.). Science Fiction, Fantasy, and Weird Fiction Magazines. Westport, Connecticut: Greenwood Press. pp. 685–688. ISBN 0-313-21221-X.
- Bleiler, Everett F. (1998). Science-Fiction: The Gernsback Years. Kent OH: The Kent State University Press. ISBN 0-87338-604-3.
- Crawford, Gary William; Frank, Frederick S.; Fisher, Benjamin Franklin; Ljungquist, Kent (1983). The 1980 Bibliography of Gothic Studies. Baton Rouge LA: Gothic Press. ISBN 0-913045-00-4.
- Edwards, Malcolm; Nicholls, Peter (1993). "SF magazines". In Clute, John; Nicholls, Peter (eds.). The Encyclopedia of Science Fiction. New York: St. Martin's Press, Inc. pp. 1066–1071. ISBN 0-312-09618-6.
- Ketterer, David (1992). Canadian Science Fiction and Fantasy. Bloomington, Indiana: Indiana University Press. ISBN 0-253-33122-6.
- Moskowitz, Sam (March 1990). "Canada's Pioneer Science-Fantasy Magazine (La première revue canadienne de science fantaisie)". Science Fiction Studies. 17 (1): 84–92. doi:10.1525/sfs.17.1.084. JSTOR 4239976.
