= Eerie Stories =

American pulp magazine

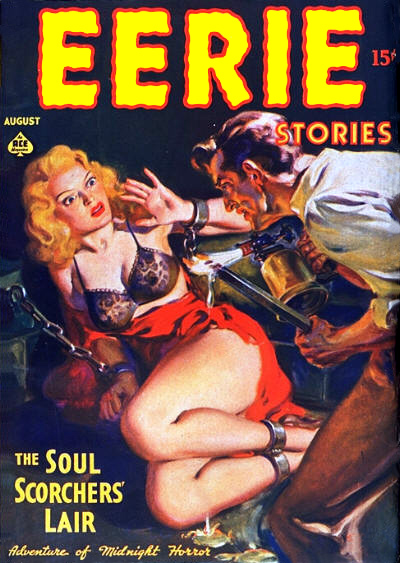
Cover of the only issue, August 1937, by Norman Saunders

Eerie Stories was an American weird menace pulp magazine that published one issue in 1937. The publisher had failed with another weird menace pulp, Ace Mystery, the year before, and pulp historian Robert K. Jones comments that Eerie Stories was "even feebler". All twelve stories were written under house names; one, "Mate of the Beast" by Leon Dupont, was a reprint from Ace Mystery with a new title, and there may have been other reprints. In the opinion of pulp historian Michael L. Cook, the stories "really had no redeeming value and were even poor entertainment". The tagline was "Startling Adventures in Chilling Horror", but in Jones' opinion the stories fell short.

== Bibliographic details ==
Eerie Stories only issue was dated August 1937, and was published by Ace Magazines of New York, and edited by Harry Widmer. It was pulp format, 128 pages, and priced at 15 cents.

== Sources ==
- Ashley, Mike (1985). "Eerie Stories". In Tymn, Marshall B.; Ashley, Mike (eds.). Science Fiction, Fantasy and Weird Fiction Magazines. Westport, Connecticut: Greenwood Press. pp. 202–203. ISBN 0-3132-1221-X.
- Cook, Michael L. (1983). "Eerie Stories". In Cook, Michael L. (ed.). Mystery, Detective, and Espionage Magazines. Westport, Connecticut: Greenwood Press. p. 214. ISBN 0-313-23310-1.
- Jones, Robert Kenneth (1975). The Shudder Pulps. West Linn, Oregon: FAX Collector's Editions. ISBN 0-913960-04-7.
