= Black Donnellys =

Irish-Canadian family

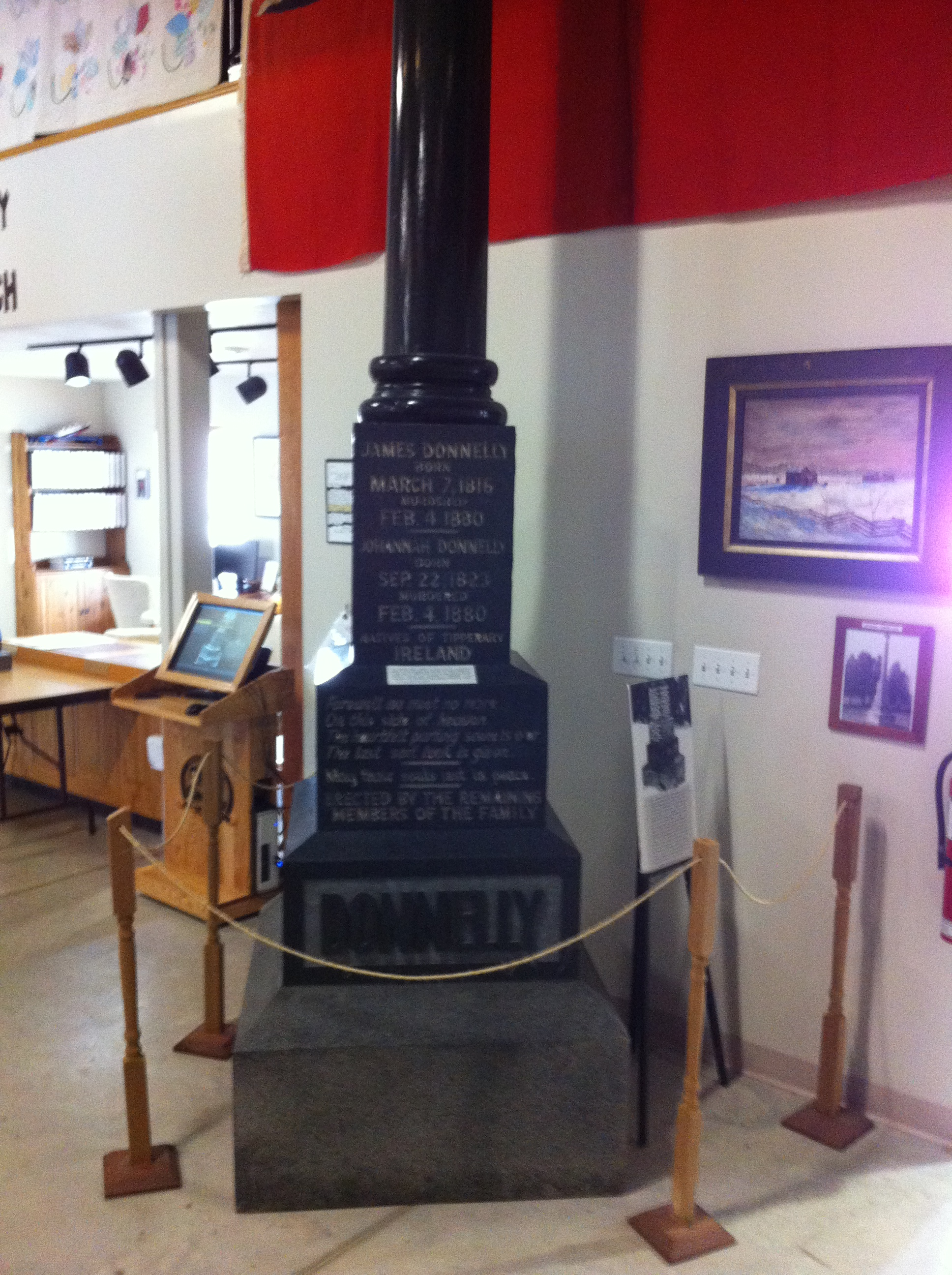
A replica of the original Donnelly tombstone, belonging to Ray Fazakas, on display at the Lucan Area Heritage & Donnelly museum in Lucan-Biddulph, Ontario.

The "Black" Donnellys were an Irish Catholic immigrant family who settled in Biddulph township, Upper Canada (later the province of Ontario), about 25 km northwest of London, in the 1840s. The family settled on a concession road which became known as the Roman Line due to its high concentration of Irish Catholic immigrants in the predominantly Protestant area. Many Irish Canadians arrived in the 19th century, many fleeing the Great Famine of Ireland (1845–52). Longstanding and violent feuds between the Donnellys and their neighbours culminated in a vigilante mob attacking the Donnelly homestead on 4 February 1880. The mob killed five of the Donnelly family and burned their farmhouse to the ground. No one was convicted of the murders, despite two trials and a reliable eyewitness.

Information about the family and the events surrounding their deaths was suppressed locally for much of the 20th century, due to many residents possibly having ancestors who were involved. In 1995 the Lucan and Area Heritage Society formed to document and preserve local history, and the organization opened the Lucan Area Heritage & Donnelly Museum in 2009.

== History ==
James (March 7, 1816 – February 4, 1880) and Johannah (née Magee) Donnelly (September 22, 1823 – February 4, 1880) immigrated to Canada from Moneygall, County Tipperary, Ireland, with their first child, James Jr. (1842–1877), in 1842. After arriving in Canada, they settled as squatters in Biddulph Township in southwestern Ontario. They had seven more children: William Donnelly (1845–1897); John Donnelly (September 16, 1847 – February 4, 1880); Patrick Donnelly (1849–1914); Michael Donnelly (1850-1879), killed in a pub fight; Robert Donnelly (1853–1911); Thomas Donnelly (August 30, 1854 – February 4, 1880); and Jennie "Jane" Donnelly (1857–1917). James's niece, Bridget Donnelly (May 1, 1858 – February 4, 1880) also lived with them.

=== Land title dispute ===
The property the Donnellys settled on had originally belonged to the Canada Company which sold it in turn to James Grace. Patrick Farrell had leased part of the lot occupied by the Donnellys. In 1856, owner John Grace brought an action for ejectment in the Court of Common Pleas of Huron County. Squatting was a common North American frontier practice often supported by the courts in the establishment of common law property rights. The judge, recognizing the improvements Donnelly had made to the land during his ten-year occupancy, split the lot, awarding Donnelly the north 50 acres (20 ha) and Farrell the south.

Despite the settlement, hard feelings remained. At a barn raising bee on Saturday, June 27, 1857, James Donnelly and Farrell fought. There are various accounts of what transpired, but in the end Farrell suffered a blow to the head from a handspike thrown by Donnelly, and died two days later. James Donnelly then went into hiding. Almost two years later, James turned himself in to Jim Hodgins, a sympathetic Justice of the Peace. James was sentenced to be hanged on September 17, 1859. A petition for clemency started by his wife Johannah caused his sentence to be reduced to seven years in Kingston Penitentiary.

=== Donnelly Stagecoach Line ===
The Donnelly Stagecoach Line is believed to have been started May 24, 1873, by William Donnelly, and was a huge success. The line of stages, which ran between London, Lucan, and Exeter, was operated by William and his brothers Michael, John, and Thomas, even rivalling the official mail stage that had been in business since 1838.

The Hawkshaw stage line soon felt the pressure of competition from the Donnellys. In October 1873, Hawkshaw sold his stage to Patrick Flanagan, a husky Irishman, who was determined to drive the Donnellys out of business.

This set the stage for the feud between the Donnelly Stagecoach and the Flanagan & Crawly Stage — the Stagecoach Feud, as it came to be known. Stages were smashed and burned; horses were savagely beaten and killed; and stables burned to the ground.

The violence in the Stagecoach Feud was mostly blamed on the Donnellys. This gave the family a bad reputation, and almost every crime committed later was blamed on the family. Although they were charged with numerous crimes, "few convictions were secured against them".

=== Familiarity with the law ===
In the buildup towards the murder of the family, the Donnellys became well acquainted with local law enforcement. There are various accounts of assault, arson, trespassing, verbal assault, attempted murder, murder of Patrick Farrell, theft, robbery, assaulting a police officer, as well as various altercations with many residents of Biddulph Township.

The Donnellys were not found guilty of everything of which they were accused but through their actions they made many enemies within the township. This seems to indicate that the Donnellys were a constant source of strife and destruction in their community, but these types of crimes were common for the county in which they lived. It was not just the men of the family who would get into altercations with the law as Johannah was noted to swear at officers quite often, specifically Constable Carroll.

=== Biddulph Peace Society vigilantes ===
In June 1879, Father John Connolly created a Peace Society/Association in Biddulph. He asked everyone who attended St. Patrick's Roman Catholic Church to pledge their support. Both members and supporters of the society agreed to have their homes searched for stolen property, but the Donnellys refused to sign the pledge. The Vigilance Committee formed out of the Peace Society. Evidence indicates that The Biddulph Peace Society or some of its individual members may have been responsible for some of the arson, property damage, and physical violence cases in Biddulph.

The Peace Society used vigilantism, however, as means to enforce the traditional code of silence and the other unwritten social rules of Irish culture, which the Donnelly family were never shy about violating. For example, at a time when the religious persecution of the Catholic Church in Ireland was still in living memory, Fr. John Connolly was reported to be preaching anti-Protestantism from the pulpit when James Donnelly stood up, denounced the priest for his sermon, and said his family would from that time on attend the Catholic parish in London, Ontario. This was because the Donnelly family had many Protestant friends who later attended their funeral.

When the Tithe War was still a recent memory among many local residents and the Land War was taking place against Protestant Anglo-Irish landlords in Ireland, James Donnelly donated money towards the establishment of a local Anglican Church in Canada parish. This further outraged the Biddulph Peace Society and many other local residents in the process, but less so than the Donnelly family's past and present use of both violence and intimidation.

In August 1879, a militant splinter group of the Peace Society began covert meetings at the Cedar Swamp Schoolhouse in Biddulph. Constable James Carroll was part of the splinter group, as were many other local Irish-Canadians with long lists of grievances against the Donnelly family. This group became known as the Vigilance Committee / Society, which was later blamed for the massacre of the Donnelly family.

== Massacre ==
Members of the Vigilance Committee allegedly gathered at the Cedar Swamp Schoolhouse late in the evening of February 3, 1880, before proceeding to the Donnelly homestead. The mob killed five of the Donnelly family and burned their farmhouse to the ground. Killed were James and Johanna, their sons John and Thomas, and their niece Bridget. William Donnelly survived and was listed as the informant on the death certificates for all five, dated April 1 and 2, 1880, with the cause of death listed as "supposed to be murdered."

=== Cause for attack ===
There were many feuds associated with the reason behind the death of the Donnellys, however, what is considered to be the "final straw" was the belief that the Donnellys committed arson against Patrick Ryder's barn.

After the fire, some members of the community had had "enough" of the Donnellys and decided to take the law into their own hands once they heard that there was no supporting evidence linking the Donnellys to the burning of the barn. This news reached the congregation of St. Patrick's Church and the priest addressed that an "evil had fallen among the community" and offered a reward of C$500 for the "detection of the wicked persons" and he vowed that the "guilty party" would be punished for the crime of arson.

There were many considerations as to what was the right form of punishments; some residents believed arranging for the Donnellys to face fines and jail time would be acceptable. However, others believed that summary execution would be a better form of punishment.

=== Members list ===
"Big" Jack Kennedy, William Feeheley, Pat Dewan, Heenans (Dennis, Anthony and Michael), John Lanphier, James Harrigan, Ryders (Mr. Ryder, Jim, Patrick Jr., "Sideroad" Jim, Thomas and Daniel), McLaughlins (Martin and John), Ted Toohey, John Cain, James Maher, Quigleys (John and Patrick), Patrick Breen, James McGrath, John Purtell, Michael Blake, Ryans (John, Ned and Johnny), William Thompson, John Dorsey, John Bruin, Michael Madigan, James Kenny, and James Carroll.

=== Weapons list ===
Firearms, pitchfork (Tom Ryder), axe (Purtell), shovel (Pat Quigley and Tim Toohey), clubs and shortened wooden stake made of cordwood.

=== Original plan ===
The original plan that was generated by the Peace Society was to visit the Donnellys' family home on the night of February 3.

The original plan was to handcuff the Donnelly men, escort them from the homestead, where they would be hanged from a tree until they confessed their many violent crimes against their neighbours.

However, one of the problems with their plan was that no one really knew how this could be properly executed. Therefore, the plan was to be changed when they arrived on the Donnelly property.

In the beginning, their original intent was to only "hurt" the Donnellys and to "bring them as near the dissolution point as possible." The Peace Society accordingly set up surveillance of the Donnelly property in preparation, to determine who was in the home at what times, and how they would enter the property in the dark. Jim Feeheley is believed to have been one of the spies.

Jim Feeheley would visit the Donnelly house earlier in the night as a distraction and to get an understanding on the type of situation they would be encountering that night. There were some more problems associated with these plans such as the fact that the society had not planned on Donnelly leaving the Donnelly home and taking his horse to Big Jim Keefe. The society thought Keefe was spying for them; and finally, they also did not expect hired farmhand Johnny O’Connor to be inside the house during the night chosen for the attack.

=== Day of the massacre ===
It can be said that the day of February 3, began like any other day in the Donnelly household. In the morning, James Donnelly sat down at the kitchen table with his son, Tom, and asked him to write a letter to Alderman Edmund Meredith, the London lawyer who was going to be handling the Donnelly's case against Patrick Ryder. He wrote;

Mr. Meredeth,

SIR- On the fifteenth of last month Pat Ryder's barn were burned. All the vigilance committee at one pointed to my family as the once that did it. Ryder found out that all my boys were at a wedding that night. He at once arrested me on suspicion, an also sent a constable after my wife to St. Thomas. The trial has been postponed four different times, although we are ready for our trial at any time. They examined a lot of witnesses but can't find anything against us. Ryder swore that we lived neighbours to each other for thirty years and never had any differences, and had no reason for arresting us only we are blamed for everything... The presiding Magistrates are old Grant and newly made one, Casey. They are using us work that mad dogs. Mr. McDermid is attending on our behalf... they has the first trial in Lucan, and tomorrow again, and I am informed they are going to send us for trial without a tittle of evidence. If so I will telegraph you when we start for London to meet us at the City Hotel, and get us bailed to take our trail before the judge, and I want you to handle the case in our behalf. There is not the slightest case for our arrest, it seems hard to see a man and women over sixty years of age dragged around as laughing stock.

Yours truly,

James Donnelly, SEN 2

Once the letter was delivered, the day carried on as it normally would; at roughly 4 o'clock Johnny, James and Jim returned to their house on Roman Line. This timeframe was given by William Casey because he stated that he remembered the sound of the Donnellys speeding down Roman Line and that they were being "reckless."

Casey stopped what he was doing in the front yard to bear witness to this recklessness and took note of the time at which they passed by his home. They had picked up Johnny O'Connor from town, because James Donnelly needed assistance on the farm; this was a normal occurrence. When the chores were completed it was Mr. Donnelly that insisted that Johnny O'Connor stay the night and to sleep in Mr. Donnelly's bed as a form of protection as well as the bed was extremely big.

As the Donnellys were getting ready for bed, Feeheley stopped by to say "hello" before returning home from Whalen's. Feeheley did not stay long; he was just there to observe the property for the Peace Society; however he did not notice that the John Donnelly voice he thought he heard coming from Mr. Donnelly's bedroom was actually Johnny O'Connor's voice. In fact, John Donnelly had gone to Big Jim Keefe to pick up the vehicle in order to travel to their trial in London, Ontario, in the morning; he stayed there overnight. Once the goodbyes were said, the family returned to their bed, and fell asleep.

=== First massacre ===
Once the decision to attack the Donnellys was made, the Peace Society got together at roughly one o’clock in the morning to drink before they mounted the attack on this family; this is referred to as the "water of life." The men used the liquor as a way to numb their senses as well as use it as a way to enhance their courage and their motivation.

Once the men had had enough alcohol in their systems, they began to walk in the direction of the Donnellys' home; there were also many witnesses that stated they could hear the group of men coming down Roman Line that night. When the group of men finally arrived at the house, they surrounded the perimeter of the property and James Carroll took the first step inside the house, which was considered to be the first attack of the massacre; creating an element of surprise.

Carroll walked into the room and slowly took the handcuffs out of his pocket (these were given to him by the Constable Hodgins) and handcuffed Tom Donnelly while he was still asleep.

Once Tom Donnelly was handcuffed, Carroll proclaimed that "he was under arrest," just as Tom sat up in bed along with Ms. Donnelly and Bridget Donnelly due to all the commotion. Carroll slowly moved from Tom's bedroom into Mr. Donnelly's bedroom, where he noticed that John Donnelly was nowhere to be found; their plan was to kill all the Donnellys in a single location.

The commotion woke up Mr. Donnelly and he noticed that his son was handcuffed and proclaimed "what have you got against us now?" Carroll responded that they were being charged with another crime. At that moment in time, Tom requested that Carroll read the warrant; since there was no warrant involved, Carroll let out a signal for the men to come storming into the house with their clubs.

At this point, the men began to beat Mr. Donnelly, Ms. Donnelly and Tom Donnelly; Bridget Donnelly escaped and raced up the stairs to hide from the attackers. Johnny was terrified and he hid under Mr. Donnelly's bed. Since the attackers were not expecting him to be there that night, they did not know to look for him and prevent him serving as a witness.

The first one to fall to the ground was Mr. Donnelly; he was beaten severely and James Maher hit his skull repeatedly, causing brain damage. Mrs. Donnelly fought hard against her attackers. But Carroll beat her to the floor while Tom Donnelly was fighting back to stop the attackers. He broke free from the attackers and ran towards the front door. Tom Ryder was waiting for him with a pitchfork and thrust its sharp points into him several times.

Once Tom was limp on the ground, James Maher, Timothy Toohey and Patrick Quigley carried his body back into the house and placed it in the kitchen with his parents while Carroll removed his handcuffs from his wrist.

"Hit this fellow on the head with that shovel and break his head open!" It was said that either Jim Toohey or Patrick Quigley bashed Tom's head in three or four times.

Once Mr. Donnelly, Ms. Donnelly and Tom Donnelly were lying on the ground, the attackers realized that Bridget Donnelly was nowhere to be found. A group of men went upstairs and found Bridget hiding and they beat her. When she was limp, they brought her down the stairs to where the rest of her family were lying. One of the attackers bashed in the dog's head with a shovel because it would not stop barking.

After the group realized they were missing John Donnelly, they made a different plan to rid their community of the Donnellys - they lit the house on fire with the bodies still inside. They then went hunting for John.

=== Johnny O'Connor ===
Originally the massacre was not intended to have any witnesses, however the Peace Society did not intend for Johnny O’Connor to be at the Donnelly's farmhouse and for him to escape the fire. Johnny O’Connor was a young farm boy that had gone to the Donnelly's house to assist them with farm work; it was not until later in the night that Mr. Donnelly had encouraged Johnny to spend the night and assist them with the livestock in the morning. The O’Connors were considered to be good friends of the Donnellys and assisted them regularly with chores around their farm; the mob did not take this into consideration when planning their attack.

=== The second massacre, at Whalen Corners ===
At roughly two in the morning, the Peace Society arrived at Whalen Corners, the location of homes of other members of the Donnelly clan. They surrounded the house, in a similar way as they did to the Donnellys' house. However, the difference was that the men were not as relaxed as they were at the beginning of their rampage so they decided to try to get Will Donnelly to come out of the house, instead of storming it. They attempted to do this by beating his prized stallion in order to lure him out of the house in response to the dying screams of his horse. The problem was that the stables were so far from the home and no one inside was able to hear what was going on outside. Jim Ryder called for "Will!" while carrying a shotgun to the side door of the house. Will Donnelly was woken up by the calling out of his name. However, when John opened the door to Will's house, he was greeted by a hail of gun shots to the chest and groin; thirty holes were made in his chest that pierced his lung, broke his collarbone and several ribs. John dropped to the ground; McLaughlin and Ryder walked up to the body and placed seven more shots into his body as a form of punishment for his action against the community. Norah Donnelly (Will Donnelly's wife) heard the commotion and rushed out and when she saw John's body on the ground, she tried to pull him to safety but he was too heavy for her to move. Will Donnelly hid in the bedroom and was able to peer through a window in order to get a glimpse of the individuals who were attacking the house. John Kennedy and Carroll were only a few feet away from the bed where he was hiding with his wife. He could also place the faces of Big Mike Heenan, William Carroll and Patrick Ryder but the other faces were obscured by the darkness. Since Norah could not pull John to safety, Hogan got down on his knees and sneaked out to where John was located and pulled him into the bedroom, which left a bloody trail behind him (John Donnelly died five minutes after). The men of the Peace Society were so worn out from their previous attacks that they decided to just survey the perimeter until someone showed their face inside; the members of the household hid in the house for almost three hours before the group decided to leave the property.

"There's been enough bloodshed tonight boys. Let's go home."

These words spoken by Jim Feeheley ended the massacre, which would have continued to Big Jim Keefe's house.

There were two trials in London, Ontario, at the courthouse on Ridout Street.

== First trial ==
The preliminary hearings started on February 4, 1880, at McLean's Hotel in Lucan, Ontario. There were three preliminary hearings leading up to the first trial in October 1880. In between the preliminary hearings and the trial, there was a change of venue request, which was ultimately rejected. The crown felt that a fair trial could not be obtained in Middlesex County, as it was too biased against the Donnellys. One of the key witnesses for the prosecution was Johnny O’Connor, who had witnessed the whole massacre. The vigilantes did everything in their power to try to keep Johnny from testifying. Michael O’Connor, Johnny's father, owned two houses on Francis Street, in Lucan. One of the houses was known to have run a bootlegging operation at times, the other house he rented to Bob Donnelly. During the late evening of April 13, the vigilantes burnt the house of O’Connor to the ground. The vigilantes harassed not only the father, but also Johnny's mother, Mary: while she was in London, on one occasion when she passed Patrick "Grouchy" Ryder on the street, he threatened and insulted her. She laid a charge against him of using abusive language. At his court appearance, fellow vigilantes swore that he was in Biddulph at the time of the alleged infraction, and this led to his discharge. Young Johnny was not deterred from testifying by any of the group's activities.

The trial took place on Monday, October 4, 1880, in London, Ontario, with James Carrol being charged with the murder of Johannah Donnelly. The crown prosecutor was Aemilius Irving assisted by James MaGee; the defence consisted of Hugh MacMahon, William Meredith and John Blake. The witness list for the prosecution was as follows; William Donnelly, Nora Donnelly, Martian Hogan, William Blackwell Hock M.D., William Thomas Trounce Williams (Chief of London Police), Enoch Murphy, James Feeley, Robert Rojs, John O’Connor, Patrick Whelan, Anne Whelan, Mary Hastings O’Connor, Michael O’Connor, Charles Pope, William Hodge, Henry Phair, and Martin Hogan Jr. The two key witnesses were Johnny O’Connor and William Donnelly. Johnny O’Connor's testimony ran, in part:

Tom told him to read the warrant: Carroll said there was lots of time for that: then in a few minutes a whole crowd jumped in and commenced hammering them with sticks and spade; then Tom ran out into the front room and outside: I saw him run out and Bridget ran upstairs and I ran after her and she shut the door and I ran back again in the room and got under the bed behind the clothes basket: then they started hammering Tom outside: the bed was about two feet and an inch high from the floor and no curtains about the bottom of the bed: they carried Tom in the house again: I heard them throw him down on the floor, and heard the handcuffs rattling or whatever they had on his hand: then someone said, "Hit that fellow with a spade and break his skull open." Then the fellow hit his three or four whacks with the spade: when Tom was outside I heard him say, "Oh! Oh! Oh!" I did not see them hit Tom with the spade, but heard them; then some of them told the fellow that had the light to bring it here to where Tom was: he brought the light and they were doing something to Tom: they were standing round him: I saw the standing round him: then I saw Thomas Ryder and John Purtell standing near the room door, the bedroom door; then some of them asked where was the girl; another one answered, "Look upstairs"; then they went upstairs and saw some of them too, but did not know any of them; then they came down: I heard nothing going on upstairs, and poured coal oil on the bed and set it on fire; it was the bed I was under; I heard someone say that oil would burn off the blanket, and wouldn’t burn at all; then they all run out when they set fire to it; then I got out from under the bed and put on my pants and tried to quench the fire with my coat; I hit the fire with my coat: I then heard Tom breathing, then I went out to the front room and saw Tom dead on the floor; then I ran out to the kitchen and tramped on the old women; there was a light from the fire in my bed, also from Tom’s bed: the door of Tom’s room was open, and the door from the front room into the kitchen: the old women was lying between the door from the front room into the kitchen and the kitchen door going outside; I then ran out and went over to Whalen’s, Pat Whalen, and rapped at Whalen’s door.

He then went to explain what James Carroll, Thomas Ryder and John Purtell were wearing that night. "Purtell had dark clothes, Ryder a peaked cap, and Carroll had grey pants; their faces were not blackened: I saw one man with his face blackened, and a long coat on, a middling sized man; Carroll saw me in bed, he looked right at me, and I saw him looking right at me for a while; he did not speak to me: I did not see anyone strike the Donnellys, I only heard them."

William Donnelly was another key witness for the prosecution. Here is his testimony.

I was disturbed about half past two by John coming out of his room through my room to the kitchen; he couldn’t go to the kitchen without going through my room; I didn’t speak to John, he said I wonder whose hollering fire and rapping the door, he kept right on and opened the door; when John opened the door going into the kitchen from my room, I heard them holler, "Fire! Fire! Open the door Will!" I heard them shouting as soon as I was thoroughly awakened; I heard the door opened; I then heard two shots in rapid succession almost together; John fell back against the door from my bedroom to the kitchen; the distance between the kitchen door and my bedroom is about six or seven feet; his head came down to the jam of the door; I was lying next to the door with the glass top: my wife was sleeping on the outside: there is a stove close to the bed: I turned the side of the blind and looked out: I saw John Kennedy, James Carroll and James Ryder: they were partly in front of the glass window: Kennedy was standing where his name is now marked on the plan about three feet from the door: James Carroll and James Ryder were standing where their names are written on the plan about nine feet from my window: I saw three others outside of the fence, near to the little gate: I calculated that they were Wm. Carroll, Patrick Ryder Jr., and Michael Heenan: I couldn’t swear positively to them; I don’t speak positively as to them; I speak positively as to John Kennedy, James Carroll and James Ryder; these persons are well known to me.

The defence witnesses were friends and family of the vigilante community, and backed the stories and alibis of each of the members that stood trial. John Purtell, one of the prisoners stated that he was not a member of the committee and had never attended any of the meetings. Instead he was a hired man of James McGrath's and lived with him and never left the house that night. James and his father Matthew backed his story. Prisoner Thomas Ryder said he was a brother of Patrick "Grouchy" Ryder and that he spent the night at home playing cards with his brother-in-law Valentine Mackey, his brother James Ryder Sr., and James Toohey. Those named agreed that they played cards and went home to their own places. Prisoner James Ryder Jr. said that he and his five brothers - William, Michael, Patrick Jr., John and Maurice - all spent the night at their father's house. Vigilante Michael Blake said that he also had spent the night there. Prisoner Martin McLaughlin's daughter, Temperance, backed her father's story that he never left the house. Prisoner John Kennedy said he went to Denis Carty's, along with William Hodgins and James Brien for a game of cards. They all left together about 9:15 p.m. Each testified to the same account, with Brien adding that he visited Kennedy at 2:00 a.m. the same night to borrow medicine for a sick family member.

After a four and a half hour parley, the foreman of the jury announced that there was no chance of an agreement on a final verdict. One juror declared that he would not have convicted Carroll even if he had seen the killings himself. Another said he did not want to convict Carroll on Johnny O’Connor's word alone. The rest voted for acquittal out of fear for the dozens of others involved. In the end, one jury member was undecided, seven wanted to acquit, and four wanted to convict, resulting in a hung jury.

== Second trial ==
The second trial of James Carroll was overseen by Justice Matthew Crook Cameron, who was described as an "old Tory mugwump" and past leader of the Ontario Conservative Party. Like Justice J.W. Meredith, he steered the trial to ensure an acquittal of Carroll on February 2, 1881. James Reaney compares the two trials, noting how much smaller the second one seemed and that it lacked the legal conjecture and manoeuvring that had marked the first trial.

Before the trial the lawyers for both sides, Irving and Hutchinson, agreed to keep the trial date close to the New Year so that the jury pool would not have time to be tainted by either side. Nevertheless, the jury consisted entirely of Protestants ruling on an Irish Catholic defendant. The lawyers also agreed to drop William Donnelly's testimony about the death at Whalen's Corners, as it was decided it would not be necessary until the potential trials of five other defendants, which would only take place if James Carroll were convicted.

Reaney comes to the conclusion that the prosecution was hampered throughout the trial as their only hard evidence was the testimony of young O’Connor. While the boy did an admirable job of recollecting the events in a clear manner, Justice Cameron's continual sustaining of the defence's objections hindered the prosecution. This leads Reaney and others to conclude that Cameron was steering the trial in the defence's favour. As a result, much of the evidence that the prosecution presented to help the boy's account was not admitted. Cameron accepted the defence's assertion that the testimony from the O’Connor boy was unreliable and instructed the jury as such, thus giving the prosecution little chance of securing a guilty verdict. This applied in particular to the question of what Johnny O’Connor could have seen if the valances on the bed had been in position. His declaration that they had been removed became a point of debate within the trial, as the London Advertiser recalls. Justice Cameron's instruction to the jury that Johnny's testimony was unreliable eliminated the hard evidence the prosecution needed.

In the cross-examination of the boy, the defence tried to trip him up on his answers, but the jury and those present in the court room seemed to believe him. As the Toronto Globe accounts, "His answers were, as a rule, given very promptly and with a fearlessness that did him credit… looking straight into the face of the Crown counsel, seldom looking elsewhere." Hugh McMahon questioned Johnny next, first about the gold watch that he was wearing and secondly about the fact that his christian name was Jeremiah and that he was actually 15 years old as records in St. Patrick's parish had indicated. This was to try to discredit the boy's testimony and bring the jury to doubt the reliability of the other testimony. Johnny's godmother came to the rescue regarding his name, explaining that he was christened both Johnny and Jeremiah at birth. Trying to get the courtroom to doubt the boy's testimony never worked for the defence, as most believed he was telling the truth.

What fatally weakened the prosecution was the testimony of his mother. The defence persuaded Justice Cameron that the boy's testimony was obtained under duress, as a result of his mother's wanting more money. Justice Armour had rejected this notion in the first trial, but Cameron's decision to accept it meant that the prosecution had little chance. Mrs. O’Connor's testimony fell apart when she failed to accurately tell her boy's correct age, and she was also unable to give a clear explanation for her recent trip to Toronto to visit the Deputy Attorney General. McMahon used this to show the jury that she was trying to extort money for the boy's testimony, because her family was struggling to survive after their house had been burnt down. This made her lose her temper and she arrived on the stand already upset after a dispute with fellow witness Mrs. Pat Whalen. She should have explained clearly that her family did need more money and that the provincial bureaucrats were unwilling to provide this, and that was unrelated to the Crown prosecution. Reaney speculates that the bureaucrats did not want to aid a friend of the Donnellys. Mrs. O’Connor's testimony did not go over well and ended any chances the prosecution might have had, with judge, jury and public opinion already at least leaning if not outright against them.

After this, much of the same evidence was presented as at the first trial with the same results, with Michael Donnelly maintaining that the valances on the bed had been removed by the time he woke. At the conclusion of the trial the jury deliberated for three hours before returning a verdict of not guilty. Irving recalled that the jurors, before their final meeting, had asked him whether there was any way Carroll would not be hanged if found guilty and he had responded, "No." This seems to have been the deciding factor ensuring a not guilty verdict.

The reporters' description of the various witnesses showed that they believed the Donnelly brothers, William and Patrick, to be intelligent, well spoken individuals, and the press had a hard time believing their family to be the ruffians the evidence made them out to be. In contrast the press described Carroll and the others as a "bunch of envious, dangerous, backwoodsmen" who had a sinister appearance to them. This characterization by the press and their account ensured that while the Donnellys would not get justice in the courtroom, their story would eventually prevail.

The fact that the community and trial were strongly polarized along religious lines was a factor in the outcome and in the decisions of the judges and lawyers throughout the case. Orlo Miller in his book goes on to accuse the Biddulph Peace Society and other secret societies like the Whiteboys of using their influence to rig the decisions of the courtroom. The lack of witnesses willing to testify, however, left the prosecution with no chance of securing a guilty verdict, and possibly not wanting one because of the backlash that could have taken place. Even Crown prosecutor Charles Hutchinson had written to Aemilius Irving stating that trying to secure a guilty verdict was a "waste of time and money," because of the widespread negative feelings toward the Donnellys throughout Middlesex County.

== Legacy ==
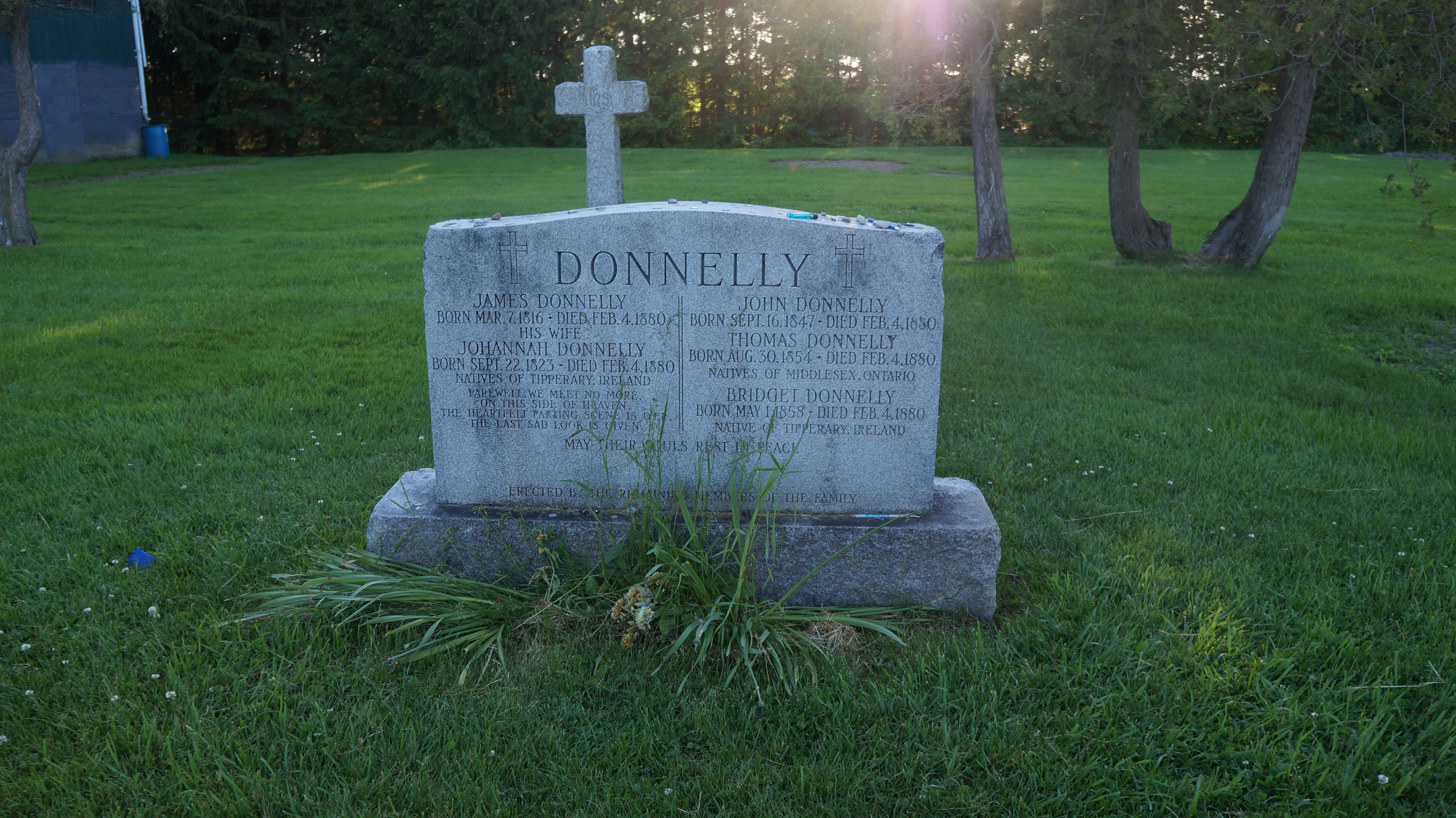
New Gravestone in St. Patrick's Cemetery

The publication of Thomas Kelley's The Black Donnellys in 1954 generated much interest in the case. The family tombstone, with the inscription "murdered" was the focus of curiosity and vandalism. Public access to the St. Patrick's Cemetery was denied. Remaining descendants of Donnelly family eventually chose to have the original tombstone replaced.

Today the Donnellys are widely known in Canadian folklore, and the story of their murder is told throughout Canadian and American farming communities. However, despite the popularity of the Donnelly story throughout North America, the inhabitants of Lucan and Biddulph Township have tried to suppress the subject. Up until recently, even among those who were born and raised in the Lucan area, many had never heard the story of the Donnelly massacre until they were adults. Oral accounts of the murders were purportedly suppressed locally due to the number of residents who had ancestors who were directly involved in the circumstances.

In recent years, several newcomers to the area have started businesses centred on the Donnelly story, creating tourism venues for visitors fascinated by the events surrounding their deaths, much to the dismay of older inhabitants. One of the more well known of these myths is that of the Midnight Lady who supposedly rides up and down the Roman Line every February 4. Another is that the ghosts of the murdered family members can be seen floating in the fields near the murder site and that horses will not ride past the former Donnelly homestead after midnight.

Ray Fazakas best illustrates the situation in his book, when he states that despite the fact that the Donnellys have been removed from Biddulph, they have managed to remain alive thanks to Canadian folklore.

== Lucan Area Heritage & Donnelly Museum ==
While for many years the story of the Donnelly massacre was suppressed in the town of Lucan, in 1995 the Lucan and Area Heritage Society formed to celebrate the heritage of the Lucan area by gathering local, historical artifacts. Over the next few years, interest in the area's heritage increased within the community, and so the collection continued to grow. In 1998, the museum acquired an 1850s log cabin with a very similar floor plan to that of the Donnelly homestead, making it a dramatic setting for visitors to hear the retelling of the Donnelly story, and visualize the tragic events that occurred in the early morning hours of February 4, 1880.

The Lucan Area Heritage Society, District Lions Club, and Township of Lucan Biddulph raised over $600,000 for the construction of a new museum building after the University of Western Ontario identified the need for a new museum to spur economic growth in the community. This building reached completion in 2008, and opened to the public in 2009. The new Lucan Area Heritage & Donnelly Museum now highlights the Ray Fazakas Donnelly Collection, rotating exhibits, the "Donnelly Log Cabin", and the Hearn barn, which displays a variety of artifacts relating to agriculture in Biddulph in the past 150 years.

== Cultural references ==
In the 1970s, the history of the Donnelly family and their tragic end was portrayed in a trilogy of plays, each in three acts, written by James Reaney. The trilogy includes Sticks and Stones, The St. Nicholas Hotel and Handcuffs. The plays were born from Reaney's "Listeners' Workshops," a process by which a work was created from actions and images. Sticks and Stones premiered at the Tarragon Theatre, November 24, 1973.

Stompin' Tom Connors wrote two songs in reference to the Donnelly family: "The Black Donnellys' Massacre" and "Jenny Donnelly", the latter of which was covered by Chantal Vitalis.

The Donnellys are mentioned in Steve Earle's 1990 song "Justice in Ontario", comparing the conviction of six motorcycle gang members in a murder in Port Hope, Ontario, to the massacre of the Donnellys by unpunished assailants, as examples of unequal justice.

Gene MacLellan sings a song called "Death of the Black Donnellys", released on his 1997 posthumous album Lonesome River, which refers to the Donnellys as Satan's spawn and their killers "... send them back to Hell".

In the 1980s, the London, Ontario, punk band The Black Donnellys formed, taking their name from this infamous feud.

In 2005, Chris Doty wrote The Donnelly Trials, a play he based on the court script where twelve members of the audience become the jury deciding the fate of the defendants with the script providing two separate endings for either a "Guilty" or "Not Guilty" verdict. The play was performed in the same courtroom in which the actual trial took place.

In 2007, an NBC television series entitled The Black Donnellys followed the lives of four Irish brothers and their entrance into organized crime in Hell's Kitchen, New York City. The title is a homage to the infamous family, though the show is otherwise not related to the historical Donnellys.

In 2012, on October 26 and 27, the Waterford Heritage and Agricultural Museum hosted Moonlight & Mayhem ~ The Murder of Michael Donnelly. This was an outdoor, after dark, theatrical production recreating the gruesome murder of Michael Donnelly which happened at the Commercial Hotel in Waterford. It was a guided walking tour presented twice nightly.

In 2013, The Donnellys ran from April 11 until April 20. It was presented by the Owen Sound Little Theatre at the Roxy Theatre in Owen Sound, Ontario. It was a musical drama by Peter Colley and directed by Corry Lapointe.

In 2015, running from March 7 to 29 at the Citadel Theatre in Edmonton, Catalyst Theatre's production of Vigilante, Jonathan Christenson as writer/director/composer/lyricist. The play is also touring in early 2017.

In 2017 Black Donnellys a 43min short film at IMDb it was filmed by Aaron Huggett in Ontario, Canada, screenings will be in October 2017.

== References in books and plays ==
- Christenson, Jonathan (2015). Vigilante.
- Colley, Peter (1976). The Donnellys. Playwrights Guild of Canada. Stage play.
- Critchton, William (1977). The Donnelly Murders.
- Kelley, Thomas P. (1954). The Black Donnellys: The True Story of Canada's Most Barbaric Feud.
- Kelley, Thomas P. (1962). Vengeance of The Black Donnellys: Canada's Most Feared Family Strikes Back from The Grave.
- Edwards, Peter (2005). Night Justice: The True Story of the Black Donnellys. Key Porter Books.
- Fazakas, Ray (1977). The Donnelly Album. Canada: Macmillan.
- Fazakas, Ray (2001). In Search of The Donnellys. Hamilton, Ontario: self-published.
- Hendley, Nate (2011). "The Black Donnellys: The Outrageous Tale of Canada's Deadliest Feud". Amazing Stories. Toronto, ON: Lorimer & Publishers LTD.
- Johns, Ted (1980). The Death of the Donnellys. Playwrights Guild of Canada. Stage play.
- Miller, Orlo (1962). The Donnellys Must Die (Paperback ed.). Macmillan.
- Reaney, James. (1974-1975). The Donnelly Trilogy.
- Salts, J. Robert (1996). You Are Never Alone: Our Life on the Donnelly Homestead.
- McGarvey, Peter G. (2024). The Donnelly Curse. Novel.

== See also ==
- List of massacres in Canada
- List of unsolved deaths
