= Ace Mystery =

American weird menace pulp magazine

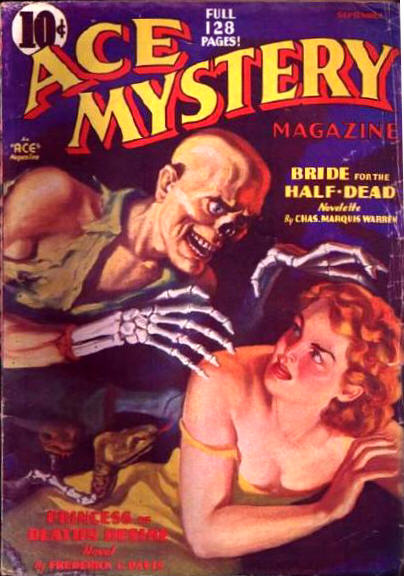
- Cover of the third issue, by Rafael De Soto
- Editor: Harry Widmer
- First issue: 1936
- Final issue Number: 3
- Company: Periodical House

Ace Mystery was a weird menace pulp magazine which published three issues starting in 1936, followed by two more under the title Detective Romances.

Ace Mystery was published by Periodical House and edited by Harry Widmer. Writers who appeared in the magazine included Frederick C. Davis, who wrote all three lead novels, Hugh B. Cave, and Robert C. Blackmon; magazine historian Michael Cook comments that these were capable writers, but the rest of the magazine was too low-quality to succeed.

Some of the stories were fantasy rather than weird menace—for example, one story was about a sculptor who could shrink dead bodies. Science fiction historian Mike Ashley is more positive than Cook, describing the magazine as "of reasonably good quality", and singling out Charles Marquis Warren's "Coyote Woman" for praise; Ashley quotes pulp historian Robert K. Jones, who considered the "Coyote Woman"...among the most effective vampire stories to appear in the pulps".

== Bibliographic details ==
The publisher, Periodical House, was a subsidiary of Ace Magazines of New York; the issues under the Ace Mystery title were dated May–June, July–August, and September–October 1936. The two Detective Romances titles were dated November 1936 and January 1937. The editor was Harry Widmer; the magazine was in pulp format, 128 pages, and priced at 10 cents.

== Sources ==
- Ashley, Mike (1985). "Ace Mystery". In Tymn, Marshall B.; Ashley, Mike (eds.). Science Fiction, Fantasy, and Weird Fiction Magazines. Westport, Connecticut: Greenwood Press. pp. 6–7. ISBN 978-0-313-21221-5.
- Sampson, Robert (1983). "Ace Mystery". In Cook, Michael L. (ed.). Mystery, Detective, and Espionage Magazines. Westport, Connecticut: Greenwood Press. pp. 10–11. ISBN 0-313-23310-1.
