= Lucan Biddulph =

- Township (lower-tier)
- Township of Lucan Biddulph
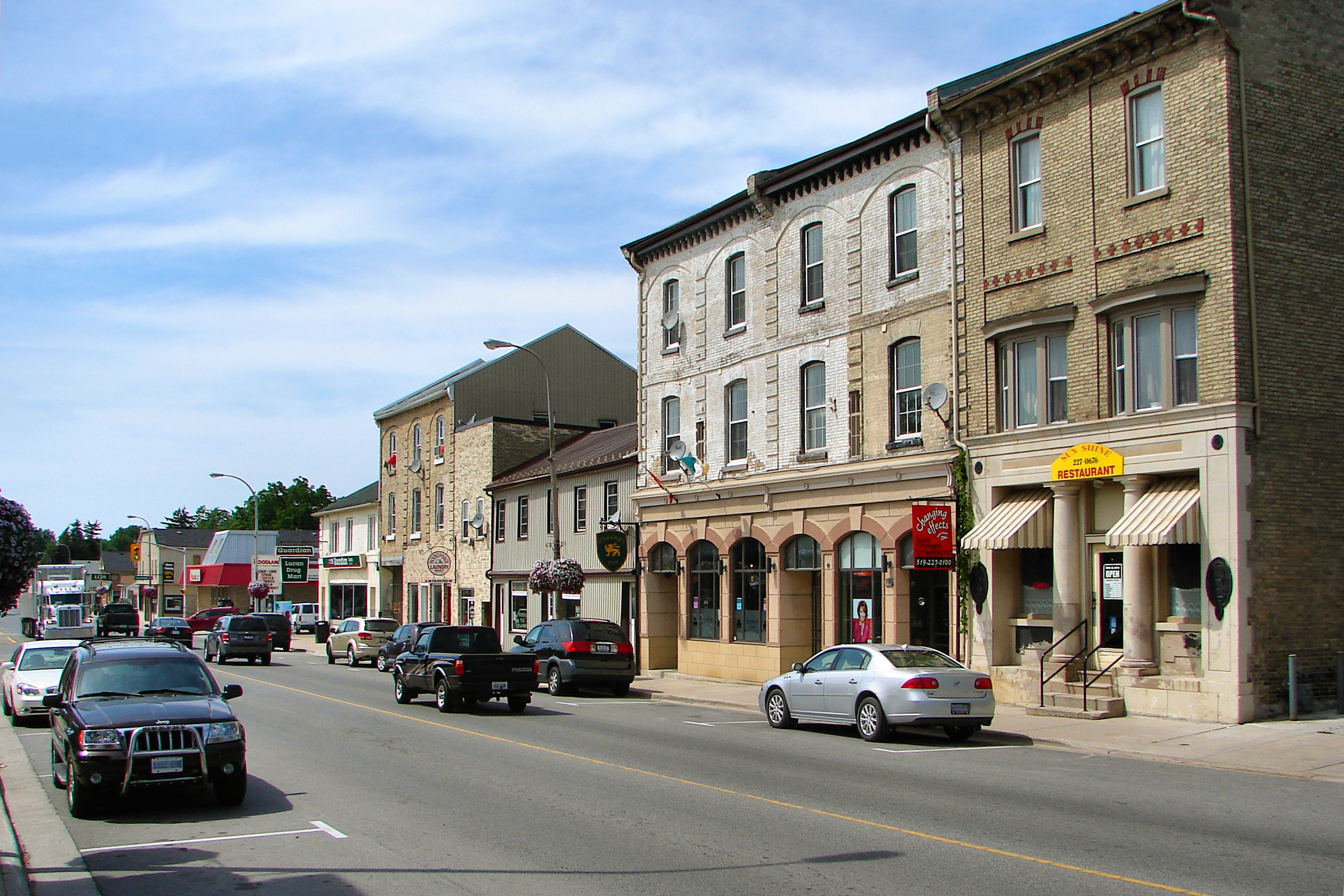
- Lucan

- Location within Middlesex County Location within Southern Ontario
- Coordinates: 43°12′N 81°23′W
- Country: Canada
- Province: Ontario
- County: Middlesex
- Formed: January 1, 1999

Government
  - Mayor: Cathy Burghardt-Jesson
  - Federal riding: Middlesex—London
  - Prov. riding: Lambton—Kent—Middlesex

Area
  - Land: 169.14 km^{2} (65.31 sq mi)

Population (2016)
  - Total: 4,700
  - Density: 27.8/km^{2} (72/sq mi)
- Time zone: UTC-5 (EST)
  - Summer (DST): UTC-4 (EDT)
- Postal Code: N0M 2J0
- Area codes: 519, 226, 548
- Website: www.lucanbiddulph.on.ca

Lucan Biddulph is an incorporated township in southwestern Ontario, Canada. It was formed on January 1, 1999, by amalgamating the Village of Lucan with Biddulph Township. The township had a population of 4,700 people in the Canada 2016 Census, up 8.3% from 4,388 people in 2011, and covers an area of 169.14 km^{2} of land within Middlesex County.

== Geography ==
Lucan Biddulph is an agricultural community with fertile soils used for growing crops and raising livestock. Many of the township's residents are employed in the agricultural sector.

== Communities ==
Communities in the township include Lucan, Granton, Mooresville, Clandeboye, Elginfield, Whalen Corners, and Prospect Hill. The township administrative offices are located in Lucan.

== History ==
=== Etymology ===
Comprising 40,000 acres (160 km^{2}) of Middlesex County, the Township of Biddulph was surveyed by agents of the Canada Company in 1830. The township took its name from John Biddulph, one of the earliest directors of the Canada Company.

Until its incorporation in 1872, the village of Lucan had been known as Marystown, named in tribute to the wife of John McDonald, who was the original land surveyor of the area. When a duplicate Marystown was found to have already registered with the Post Office, the name Lucan was put forth and accepted by the postal authorities. Lucan was named in tribute to Lord Lucan, a prominent landowner in Ireland.

=== Settlement ===
Despite being more than 500 km (310 mi) to the north, in 1829 the area became a refuge for a group of free African Americans from Cincinnati, Ohio, who had been threatened by riots and job discrimination by white people in their city. A group of roughly 200 Black Americans were granted refuge and land by the Canada Company and duly set up a colony named Wilberforce. This was one of the earliest, if not the earliest, settlements connected with the American Colonization Society (which was established in 1816 to settle free African Americans in an African colony) in Upper Canada and/or West Africa and was established before emancipation. The flight of Black refugees, escaped slaves from the South, northward into Canada beginning around this time was as part of the Underground Railroad.

Most of the Black Cincinnatians came from city life and did not adapt well to the harsh farming environment. They cleared large lots of land by logging and worked hard to sustain the colony, but much of the population declined through the 1840s as many of the original colonists moved on to larger, growing urban centres such as Detroit, Cleveland or Toronto to obtain wage-based employment. A few remained to work the land through subsequent generations.

The area was further logged and settled by white people in the 1840s and later, many from Ireland, some of whom purchased farmsteads from the departing Black settlers or new lots sold to them cheaply by the Canada Company. Nowadays fewer than 40 descendants of the ancestral Black inhabitants remain.

By 1850, the majority of the township's landholders were Irish Catholics, many of whom had immigrated from farming lands in County Tipperary, Ireland.

=== Early history ===
An important railway route belonging to the Grand Trunk Railway opened in 1856, passing through the village. The village and surrounding township prospered as a result of quicker access to larger marketplaces, such as Toronto farther to the east, and new immigrants settling the area. Its post office was established the following year in 1857.

=== Donnelly Massacre ===
Biddulph Township is known as the site of the brutal massacre on February 4, 1880, of five of the Black Donnellys, an immigrant Irish family caught up in a long-standing local feud. These events have been written about many times and are etched into the criminal history of rural Ontario; it is well known in Canada and nearby areas of the United States. Five members of the family were killed in two separate locations northwest of London, Ontario. Nobody has been convicted of the murders despite the subsequent trials which led to publicity. This crime is noted to be one of the most horrific crimes in Canadian history. Tours are available at the Donnelly's home which is just south of Lucan. As of today, there are no relatives of the Donnellys living in the area.

=== Lucan Snowstorm ===
A record snowfall (a.k.a. "Snowmageddon") occurred between Dec. 4–8, 2010, affecting Huron and Middlesex counties. A total of 177 cm (68") of snow fell during a 102-hour period (it snowed on 98 of those hours).

=== Operations ===
In 2017, Lucan selected CH2M to provide operations and maintenance services for Lucan's water system for five years, providing water to more than 4,500 residents in the township and Granton urban centre and rural properties. Also in 2017, Lucan received a grant from the Canada Ontario Early Learning and Child Care fund, to build a 9,000 square foot licensed day care facility.

== Demographics ==
Historical population
Year	Pop.	±%
1996	4,166	—
2001	4,201	+0.8%
2006	4,187	−0.3%
2011	4,338	+3.6%
2016	4,700	+8.3%

In the 2021 Census of Population conducted by Statistics Canada, Lucan Biddulph had a population of 5,680 living in 2,115 of its 2,172 total private dwellings, a change of 20.9% from its 2016 population of 4,700. With a land area of 169.08 km^{2} (65.28 sq mi), it had a population density of 33.6/km^{2} (87.0/sq mi) in 2021.

Canada census – Lucan Biddulph community profile

	2021	2016	2011
Population	5,680 (+20.9% from 2016)	4,700 (+8.3% from 2011)	4,338 (+3.6% from 2006)
Land area	169.08 km^{2} (65.28 sq mi)	169.14 km^{2} (65.31 sq mi)	169.15 km^{2} (65.31 sq mi)
Population density	33.6/km^{2} (87/sq mi)	27.8/km^{2} (72/sq mi)	25.6/km^{2} (66/sq mi)
Median age	37.6 (M: 36.8, F: 38.8)	39.6 (M: 39.2, F: 40.0)	38.9 (M: 38.6, F: 39.2)
Private dwellings	2,172 (total) 2,115 (occupied)	1,837 (total)	1,653 (total)
Median household income	$105,000	$84,829

References: 2021 2016 2011

== Notable people ==
- James Austin Whelihan (1902–1986), Catholic priest, vice-principal, athletic coach and teacher

== Sports ==
Lucan is home to the Lucan Irish, a junior hockey team that plays in the Provincial Junior Hockey League. Lucan was the home of the Lucan-Ilderton Jets Senior AA hockey club, a member of the Western Ontario Athletic Association Senior Hockey League until they moved to Komoka, Ontario and became the Komoka Classics in 2011.

Lucan FC represents Lucan in Ontario Soccer Association play in the Elgin Middlesex Soccer Association.

Alexander Noble Garrett, born on the homestead, lot 11, South Boundary, Biddulph, August 13, 1862, was an outstanding athlete who excelled at a number of different sports. In particular, he was the goalkeeper on the Canadian soccer teams that toured Britain in 1888 and 1891. Later he was the sports editor of the Toronto World newspaper for many years. His son Dudley Mark Garrett played football for the Toronto Argonauts, and grandson, Dudley Morine Garrett, played hockey for the Toronto Maple Leafs and New York Rangers. A.N. Garrett died in Toronto January 17, 1941.

In 2018, the community was the winner of the Kraft Hockeyville competition, and hosted the first pre-season game of the year for the Toronto Maple Leafs versus the Ottawa Senators on Tuesday September 18, which also marked the on-ice debut of forward John Tavares as a member of the Maple Leafs.

== See also ==
- Lucan Airport
- List of townships in Ontario
