= Peep o' Day Boys =

Agrarian sectarian Protestant association

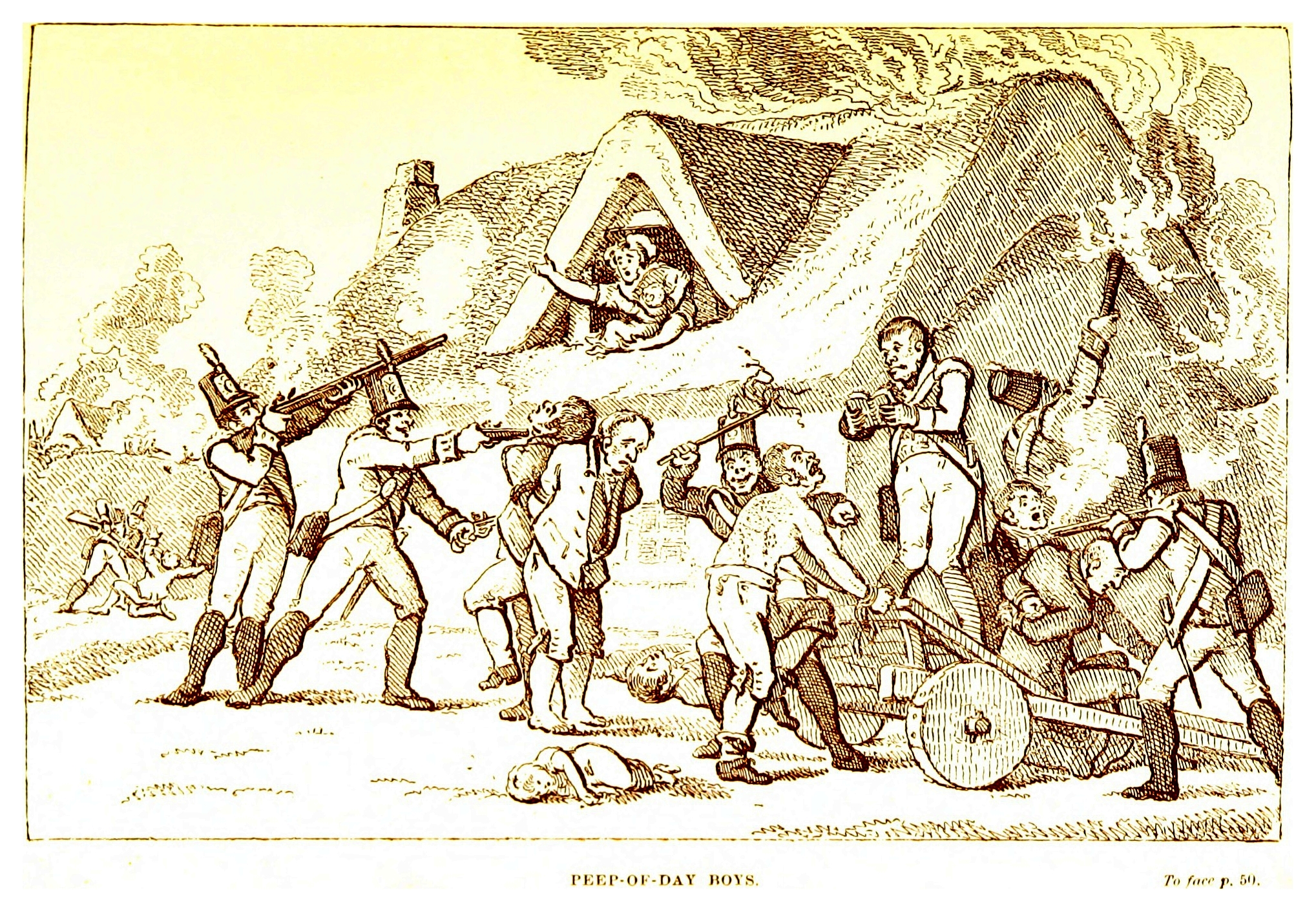
1888 cartoon of the Peep o' Day Boys

The Peep o' Day Boys was an agrarian sectarian Protestant association in 18th-century Ireland. Originally noted as being an agrarian society around 1779–80, from 1785 it became the Protestant component of the sectarian conflict that emerged in County Armagh, their rivals being the Catholic Defenders. After the Battle of the Diamond in 1795, where an offshoot of the Peep o' Day Boys known as the Orange Boys defeated a force of Defenders, the Orange Order was instituted, and whilst repudiating the activities of the Peep o' Day Boys, they quickly superseded them. The Orange Order would blame the Peep o' Day Boys for "the Armagh outrages" that followed the battle.

== Origins and activities ==
Peep-of-Day Boys were active in Ballinlough, County Roscommon in 1777. They were led by a man called Keogh from Clonmell. They declared that they would proceed on the same principles as the White Boys, swearing to pay no tithes etc.

== Orange Boys ==
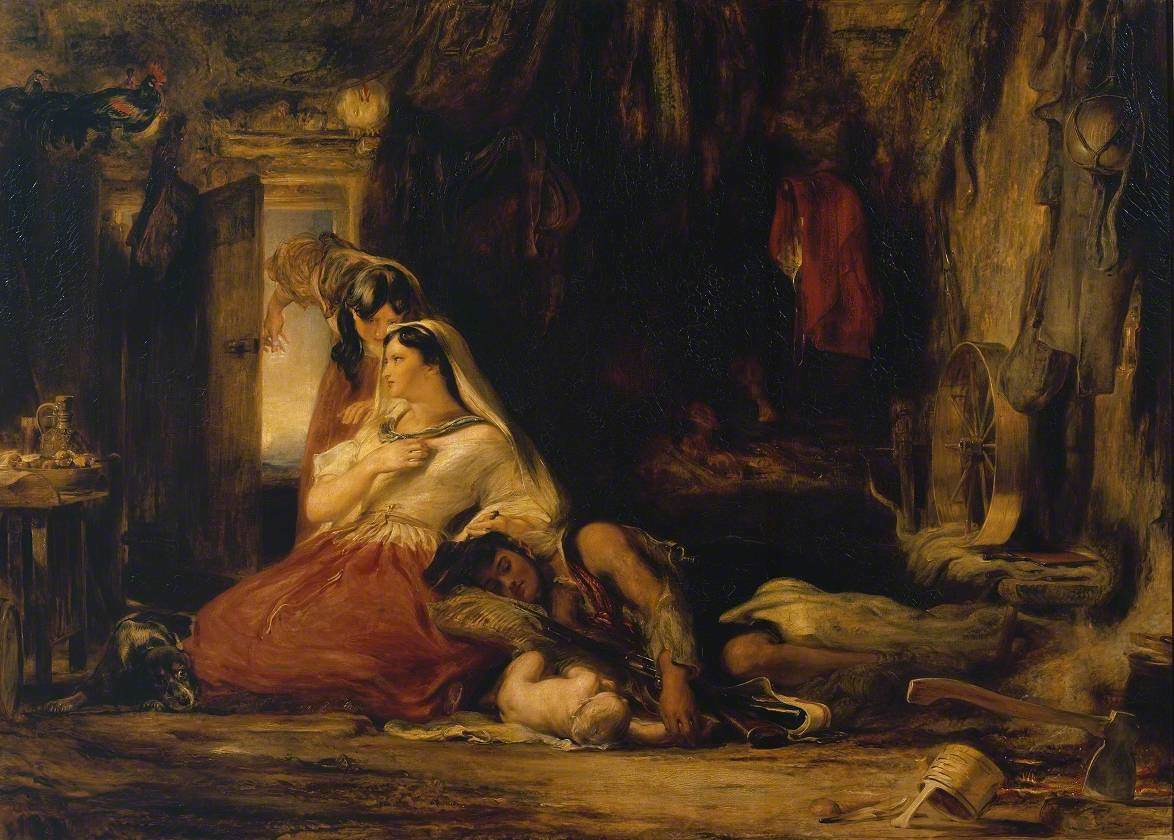
The Peep-o'-Day Boys' Cabin, in the West of Ireland by David Wilkie, 1836

In 1792, in Dyan, County Tyrone, just across the River Blackwater that separates it from County Armagh, James Wilson, Dan Winter, and James Sloan organised an offshoot of the Peep o' Day Boys called the Orange Boys, succeeded by the Orange Order. They were so-called after the Protestant King William of Orange, who had defeated his father-in-law James II at the Battle of the Boyne in 1690. The News Letter in its 1 February 1793 edition reported that a meeting of the Orange Boys, consisting of 138 members, had been held on 22 January 1793.

== The Armagh outrages ==
The winter of 1795–6, immediately following the formation of the Orange Order, saw Protestants drive around 7,000 Catholics out of County Armagh. In a sign that tension over the linen trade was still a burning issue, 'Wreckers' continued the Peep o' Day Boys strategy of smashing looms and tearing webs in Catholic homes to eliminate competition. This resulted in a reduction in the hotly competitive linen trade which had been in a brief slump. A consequence of this scattering of highly-political Catholics, however, was a spread of Defenderism throughout Ireland.

In the Irish House of Commons, 20 February 1796, Henry Grattan observed: "...that of these outrages he had received the most dreadful accounts. Their object was, the extermination of all the Catholics of that county". He described it as "a persecution conceived in the bitterness of bigotry—carried on with the most ferocious barbarity by a banditti, who, being of the religion of the state, had committed, with greater audacity and confidence the most horrid murders, and had proceeded from robbery and massacre to extermination! They had repealed by their own authority all the laws lately passed in favour of the Catholics had established in the place of those laws the inquisition of a mob, resembling Lord George Gordon's fanatics—equalling them in outrage, and surpassing them far in perseverance and success. These insurgents call themselves Orange Boys or Protestant Boys, that is, a banditti of murderers, committing massacre in the name of God, and exercising despotic power in the name of liberty."

The Orange Order repudiated the activities of the Peep o' Day Boys, and blamed them for what became known as "the Armagh outrages". Blacker, one of the very few landed gentry to join the farmer-weaver dominated Order at the onset, and later its first Grand Master of County Armagh, would suggest that no 'wrecker' or Peep o' Day Boy was ever admitted into the Orange Institution. R.H. Wallace states that the first Orangemen did not sympathise with the Peep-of-Day Boys or wreckers and never allowed them to join the Orange Institution. Mervyn Jess, however, notes that some Peep o' Day Boys might have "slipped through the net" but if so they found themselves in a vastly different organisation. Some historians have attributed the outrages to the Order.

It is possible that some members of the Orange Order were involved, for in the immediate aftermath of the Battle of the Diamond, Blacker described his disapproval of the outcome of the battle: "Unhappily... A determination was expressed to drive from this quarter of the county the entire of its Roman Catholic population... A written notice was thrown into or posted upon the door of a house warning the occupants to betake themselves “to Hell or Connaught".

== See also ==
- Agrarian society
- Hearts of Oak (Ireland)
- Hearts of Steel
- Irish Volunteers (18th century)
- Molly Maguires
- Ribbonism
- United Irishmen
- Whiteboys
- Captain Rock
