= Rightboys =

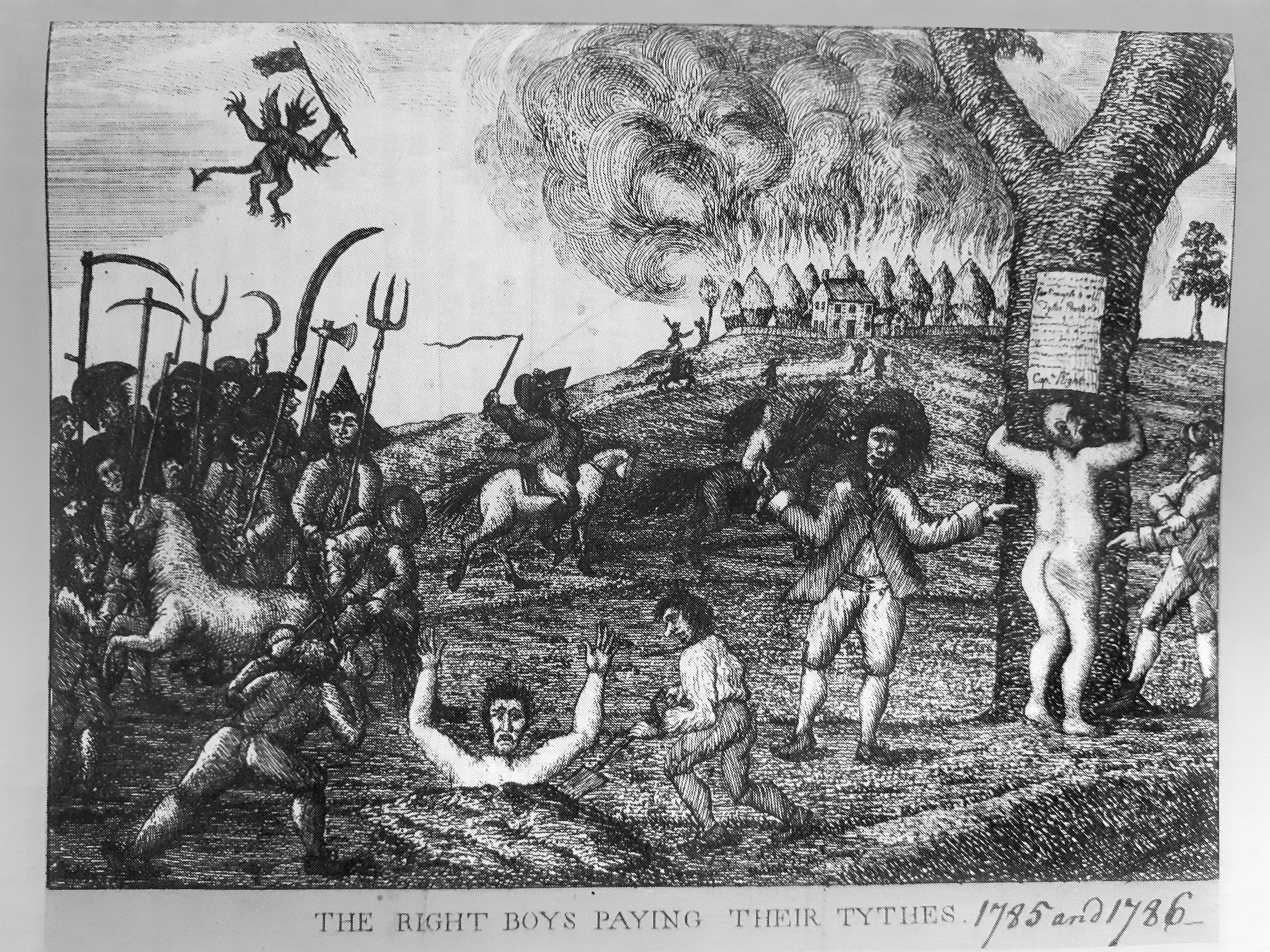
"The Right Boys Paying Their Tythes", a propagandist engraving from c. 1786

The Rightboys were a secret Irish agrarian organisation in 18th-century Ireland which, from 1785 to 1788, protested against the payment of tithes, the charges imposed by clergy from both Catholic and Anglican churches, perceived unfair rents and agricultural labourers' wages. Compared by some sources to the Whiteboys, which had been active from the 1760s, the Rightboy movement was active initially in County Cork, with protest activities subsequently spreading to counties Kerry, Limerick, Tipperary, Kilkenny, and Waterford. The group was reputedly led by the fictitious "Captain Right". As with similar agrarian agitation movements of the 18th century, the group engaged in violent resistance and protest, and were reputedly responsible for four deaths in County Cork during the 1780s. The group was also involved in non-violent forms of protest and succeeded, in some cases, in ensuring that Catholic bishops "fixed maximum payments for clerical services". The activities of the Rightboy movement saw a "lull" from 1787, when there was perceived expectation of political action on some of the group's grievances. The movement was ultimately superseded by groups such as the Society of United Irishmen (founded 1791).

== See also ==
- Captain Rock (1820s)
- Defenders (County Armagh, 1780s)
- Hearts of Steel (County Antrim, 1760s)
