= Croppy =

1798 nickname for anti-British Irish rebels

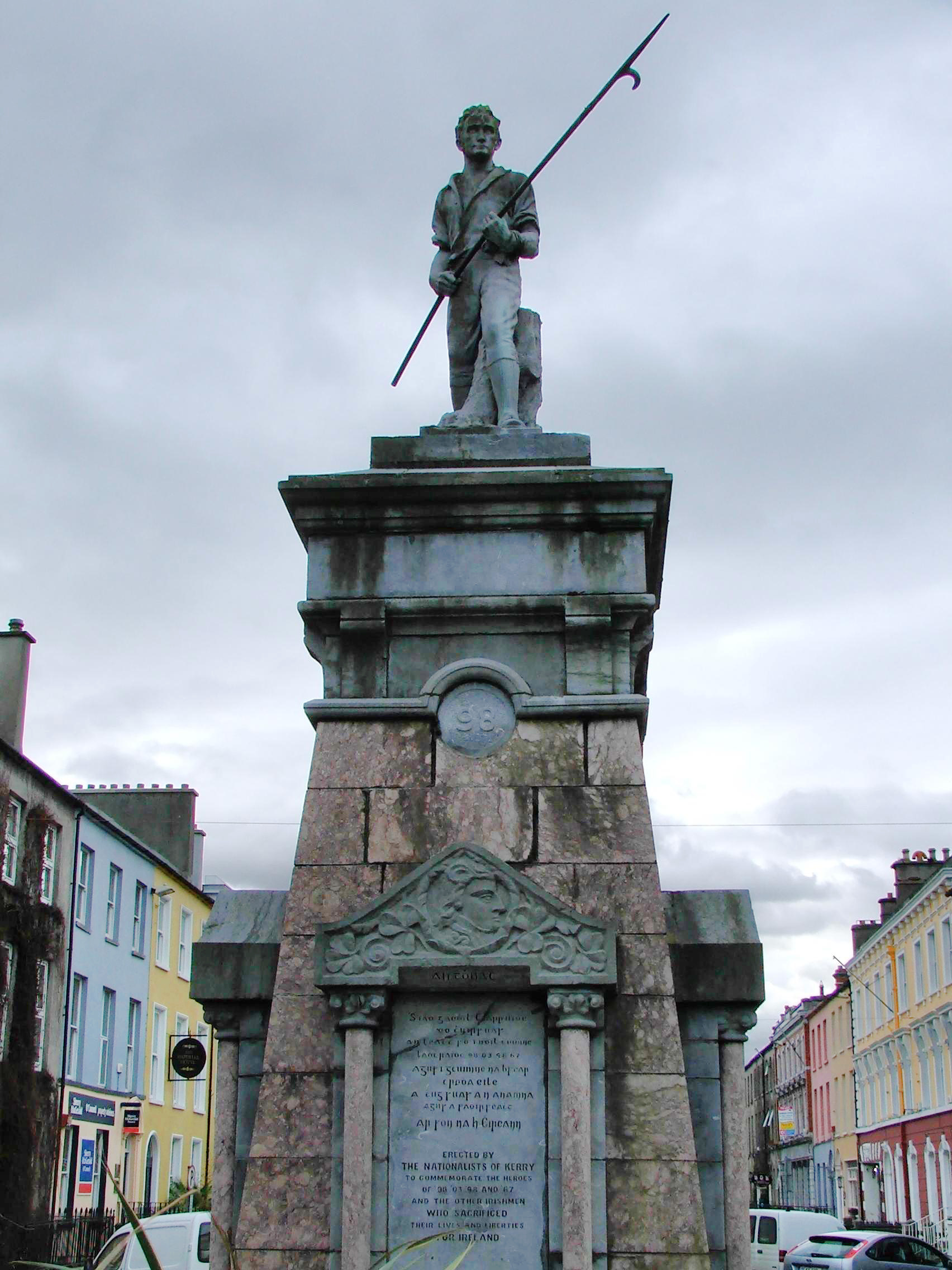
The Croppy Boy, 1798 Pikeman Memorial, Tralee, County Kerry

Croppy (Irish: craipí) was a nickname given to United Irishmen rebels during the Irish Rebellion of 1798 against British rule in Ireland.

== History ==
The nickname "Croppy" was used in 18th-century Ireland in reference to the cropped hair worn by Irish nationalists who were opposed to the wearing of powdered periwigs closely associated with members of the Protestant Ascendancy. They were inspired by the sans-culottes of the French Revolution, who also forwent the wearing of periwigs and other symbols associated with the aristocracy. During the Irish Rebellion of 1798 against British rule in Ireland, many United Irishmen rebels wore cropped hair, which led the Dublin Castle administration and government forces (in particular the militia and yeomanry) to frequently arrest anyone wearing the hairstyle as a suspected rebel. A form of torture known as pitchcapping was specifically invented to use on "croppies", who retaliated by cropping the hair of Irish unionists to reduce the reliability of this method of identifying their sympathisers.

== See also ==
- Defenders
- Ribbonmen
- The Croppy Boy
- Whiteboys
