= History of Ireland (1691–1800) =

Events and issues in Ireland from the Battle of the Boyne to the Act of Union

The history of Ireland from 1691–1800 was marked by the dominance of the Protestant Ascendancy. These were Anglo-Irish families of the Anglican Church of Ireland, whose English and Scottish ancestors had settled Ireland in the wake of its conquest by England and colonisation in the Plantations of Ireland, and had taken control of most of the land. Many were absentee landlords based in England, but others lived full-time in Ireland and increasingly identified as Irish. (See Early Modern Ireland 1536-1691). During this time, Ireland was nominally an autonomous Kingdom with its own Parliament; in actuality it was a client state controlled by the King of Great Britain and supervised by his cabinet in London. The great majority of its population, Roman Catholics, were excluded from power and land ownership under the penal laws. The second-largest group, the Presbyterians in Ulster, owned land and businesses but could not vote and had no political power. The period begins with the defeat of the Catholic Jacobites in the Williamite War in Ireland in 1691 and ends with the Acts of Union 1800, which formally annexed Ireland in a United Kingdom from 1 January 1801 and dissolved the Irish Parliament.

== Economic situation ==
In the wake of the wars of conquest of the 17th century, completely deforested of timber for export (usually for the Royal Navy) and for a temporary iron industry in the course of the 17th century, Irish estates turned to the export of salt beef, pork, butter, and hard cheese through the slaughterhouse and port city of Cork, which supplied England, the British navy and the sugar islands of the West Indies. George Berkeley, Bishop of Cloyne wondered "how a foreigner could possibly conceive that half the inhabitants are dying of hunger in a country so abundant in foodstuffs?" These economic inequalities, combined with frequent bad harvests due to weather and disease, led to Ireland being in a constant state of food crisis of varying degrees, with estimates that the country endured at least eight subsistence crises and four famines throughout the 18th century, most famously the famine of 1740–1741 that killed about 400,000 people. In the 1780s, due to increased competition from salted-meat exporters in the Baltic and North America, the Anglo-Irish landowners rapidly switched to growing grain for export, while their impoverished tenants ate potatoes and groats.

Peasant secret societies became common in 18th century Ireland as the chief means of changing landlords' behaviour. These illegal formations called themselves names like the Whiteboys, the Rightboys, the Hearts of Oak and the Hearts of Steel. Issues that motivated them included high rents, evictions, enclosure of common lands and payment of tithes to the state church, the Anglican Church of Ireland. Methods used by the secret societies included the killing or maiming of livestock, tearing down of enclosure fences and occasionally violence against landlords, bailiffs and the militia. Rural discontent was exacerbated by the rapidly growing population – a trend that would continue until the Great Famine of the 1840s.

Great economic disparities existed between different areas of the country, with the north and east being relatively highly developed, rich and involved in export of goods, whereas much of the west was roadless, hardly developed and had a cashless subsistence economy with a growing dependence on the potato as the main food supply.

== Irish politics ==
Flag of the Kingdom of Ireland 1542 – 1801

The majority of the people of Ireland were Catholic peasants; they were very poor and largely impotent politically during the eighteenth century, as many of their leaders converted to Protestantism to avoid severe economic and political penalties. Nevertheless, there was a growing Catholic cultural awakening underway. There were two Protestant groups. The Presbyterians in Ulster in the north lived in better economic conditions, but had virtually no political power. Power was held by a small group of Anglo-Irish families, who followed the Anglican Church of Ireland. They owned the great bulk of the farmland, where the work was done by the Catholic peasants. Many of these families lived in England and were absentee landlords, whose loyalty was basically to England. Many of the Anglo-Irish who lived in Ireland became increasingly identified as Irish nationalists, and were resentful of the English control of their island. Their spokesmen, such as Jonathan Swift and Edmund Burke, sought more local control.

Ireland was a separate kingdom ruled by King George III of Britain. A declaration in 1720 stated that Ireland was dependent on Britain and that the British Parliament had power to make laws binding Ireland. The king set policy through his appointment of the Lord Lieutenant of Ireland or viceroy. In practice, the viceroys lived in England and the affairs in the island were largely controlled by an elite group of Irish Protestants known as "undertakers." These men controlled the Irish Parliament and made themselves even wealthier through patronage and political corruption. A series of reform proposals culminated in a dramatic change in 1767, with the appointment of an English politician who became a very strong viceroy. George Townshend served from 1767–72 and, unlike his predecessors, was in full-time residence in Dublin Castle. Townshend had the strong support of both the king and the cabinet in London, so that all major decisions were basically made in London. He dismantled the undertaker system and centralized patronage and power. His "Castle party" took charge of the Irish House of Commons. In response, "patriot" opposition emerged to challenge the increasingly centralized, oligarchical government.

The Patriots, under the leadership of Henry Grattan, had been greatly strengthened by the American Revolution and demanded more and more self-rule. The so-called "Grattan's Parliament" forced the reversal of the mercantilist prohibitions against trade with other British colonies. The king and his cabinet in London could not risk another revolution on the American model, so they made a series of concessions to the Patriot faction in Dublin. Mostly Protestant "Volunteer" units of armed men were set up to protect against the possibility of an invasion from France. As happened in America, in Ireland the king no longer had a legal monopoly of violence.

The result was a series of new laws that made the Irish Parliament a powerful institution that was independent of the British Parliament, although still under the supervision of the King and his Privy Council. These concessions, instead of satisfying the Irish Patriots, intensified their demands. The Irish Rebellion of 1798 was instigated by those impatient with the slow pace of reform, with French support. Britain suppressed the separatists, and legislated a complete union with Ireland in 1801, including the abolition of the Irish Parliament.

=== The Penal Laws ===
The Irish Parliament of this era was almost exclusively Protestant in composition. Catholics had been barred from holding office in the early 17th century, barred from sitting in Parliament by mid-century and finally disenfranchised in 1727. Jacobitism, support for the Stuart dynasty by Gaelic and Catholic Ireland, had been utterly defeated in the Williamite war in Ireland which ended in 1691. The defeat of the Catholic landed classes in this war meant that those who had fought for James II had their lands confiscated (until a pardon of 1710). The outcome of the war also meant that Catholics were excluded from political power. One reason for this was the conversion of Catholic gentry to Protestantism to keep their lands. Another reason was the Penal laws stipulation that Catholic owned land could not be passed on intact to a single heir. This made many Catholic landholdings unproductive and caused them to fall out of Catholic hands over several generations. This period of defeat and apparent hopelessness for Irish Catholics was referred to in Irish language poetry as the long briseadh – or "shipwreck". Protestant pamphlets emphasized the positive aspects of the Glorious Revolution; liberty from absolutism, the preservation of property and a degree of electoral power.

Presbyterians, who were concentrated in the northern province of Ulster and mostly descended from Scottish settlers, also suffered from the Penal Laws. They could sit in Parliament but not hold office. Both Catholics and Presbyterians were also barred from certain professions (such as law, the judiciary and the army) and had restrictions on inheriting land. Catholics could not bear arms or exercise their religion publicly.

In the early part of the 18th century, these Penal Laws were augmented and quite strictly enforced, as the Protestant elite were unsure of their position and threatened by the continued existence of Irish Catholic regiments in the French army committed to a restoration of the Jacobite dynasty. From time to time, these fears were exacerbated by the activities of Catholic bandits known as rapparees and by peasant secret societies such as the Whiteboys. However, after the demise of the Jacobite cause in Scotland at Culloden in 1746, and the Papacy's recognition of the Hanoverian dynasty in 1766, the threat to the Protestant Ascendancy eased and many Penal Laws were relaxed or lightly enforced. In addition, some Catholic gentry families got around the Penal Laws by making nominal conversions to Protestantism or by getting one family member to "convert" to hold land for the rest of his family, or to take a large mortgage on it.

From 1766 Catholics favoured reform of the existing state in Ireland. Their politics were represented by the "Catholic Committees" – a moderate organisation of Catholic gentry and Clergy in each county which advocated repeal of the Penal Laws and emphasised their loyalty. Reforms on land ownership then started in 1771 and 1778–79.

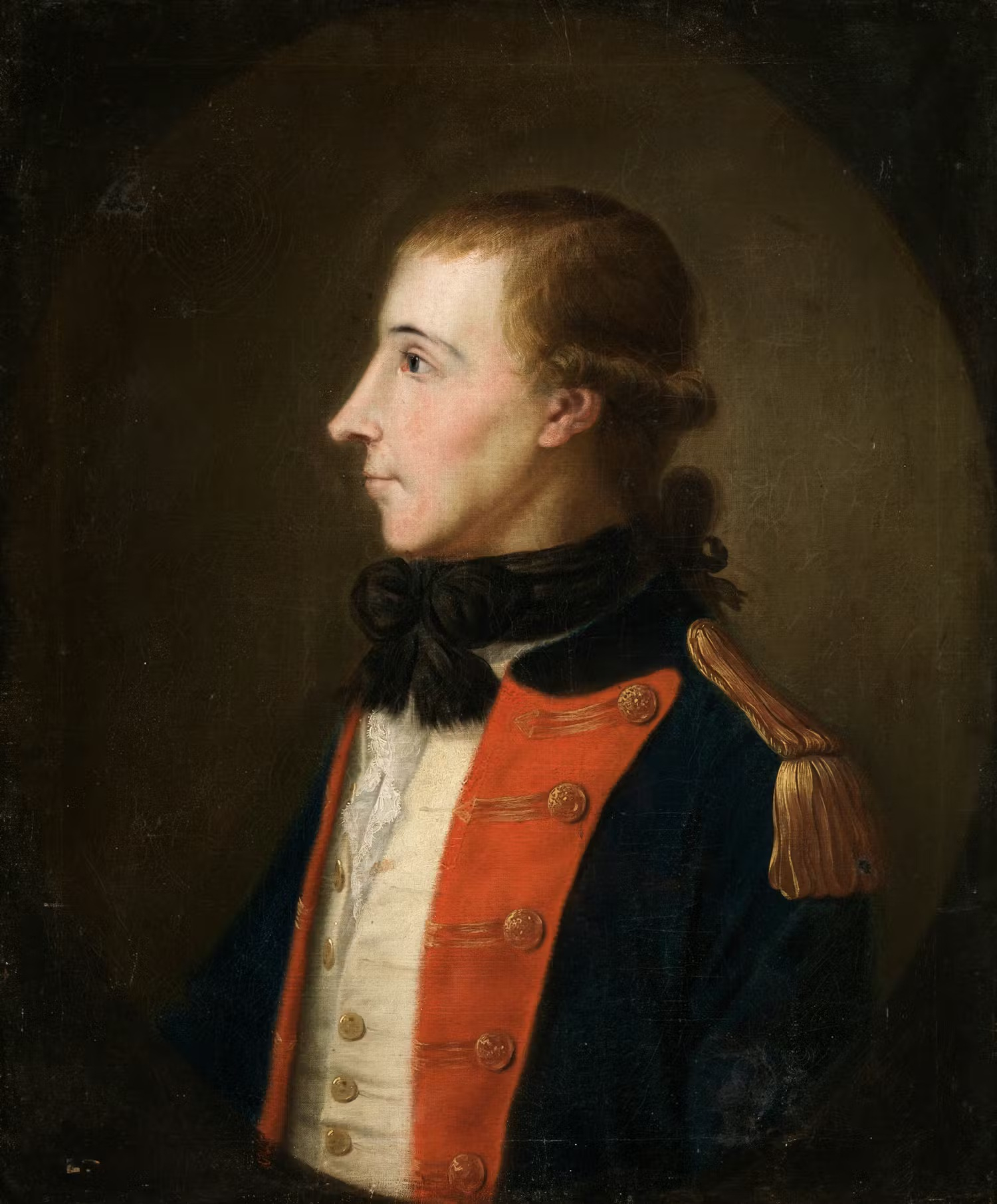
A portrait of Wolfe Tone, who was captured in the Rebellion of 1798 and committed suicide before he could be executed

=== "Grattan's Parliament" and the Volunteers ===
By the late 18th century, many of the Irish Protestant elite had come to see Ireland as their native country and were angered at the neglect from London. The Patriots, led by Henry Grattan agitated for a more favourable trading relationship with Britain, in particular abolition of the Navigation Acts that enforced tariffs on Irish goods in British markets, but allowed no tariffs for British goods in Ireland. From early in the century, Irish parliamentarians also campaigned for legislative independence for the Parliament of Ireland, especially the repeal of Poynings' Law that allowed the British Parliament to legislate for Ireland. Many of their demands were met in 1782, when Free Trade was granted between Ireland and Britain and Poynings' Law was amended. Instrumental in achieving reform was the Irish Volunteers movement, founded in Belfast in 1778. This militia, up to 100,000 strong, was formed to defend Ireland from foreign invasion during the American Revolutionary War, but was outside of government control and staged armed demonstrations in favour of Grattan's reforming agenda.

For the "Patriots", as Grattan's followers were known, the "Constitution of 1782" was the start of a process that would end sectarian discrimination and usher in an era of prosperity and Irish self-government. Conservative loyalists such as John Foster, John Fitzgibbon and John Beresford, remained opposed to further concessions to Catholics and, led by the 'Junta', argued that the "Protestant Interest" could only be secured by maintaining the connection with Britain.

Partly as a result of the trade laws being liberalised, Ireland went through an economic boom in the 1780s. Canals extended from Dublin westwards and the Four Courts and Post Office were established. Dublin's granite-lined quays were built and it boasted that it was the 'second city of the empire'. Corn laws were introduced in 1784 to give a bounty on flour shipped to Dublin; this promoted the spread of mills and tillage.

=== The United Irishmen, the 1798 Rebellion and the Acts of Union ===
Further reforms for Catholics continued to 1793, when they could again vote, sit on grand juries and buy freehold land. However they could neither enter parliament nor become senior state officials. Reform stalled because of the French war (1793), but, as the French republicans were opposed to the Catholic Church, in 1795 the government assisted in building St. Patrick's College in Maynooth for Catholic seminarians.

Some in Ireland were attracted to the more militant example of the French Revolution of 1789. In 1791, a small group of Protestant radicals formed the Society of the United Irishmen in Belfast, initially to campaign for the end to religious discrimination and the widening of the right to vote. However, the group soon radicalised its aims and sought to overthrow British rule and found a non-sectarian republic. In the words of Theobald Wolfe Tone, its goals were to "substitute the common name of Irishman for Protestant, Catholic and Dissenter" and to "break the connection with England, the never failing source of all our political evils".

The United Irishmen spread quickly throughout the country. Republicanism was particularly attractive to the Ulster Presbyterian community, being literate, who were also discriminated against for their religion, and who had strong links with Scots-Irish American emigrants who had fought against Britain in the American Revolution. Many Catholics, particularly the emergent Catholic middle class, were also attracted to the movement, and it claimed over 200,000 members by 1798. The United Irishmen were banned after Revolutionary France in 1793 declared war on Britain and they developed from a political movement into a military organisation preparing for armed rebellion. The Volunteer movement was also suppressed. However, these measures did nothing to calm the situation in Ireland and these reforms were bitterly opposed by the "ultra-loyalist" Protestant hardliners such as John Foster. Violence and disorder became widespread. Hardening loyalist attitudes led to the foundation of the Orange Order, a hardline Protestant grouping, in 1795.

The United Irishmen, now dedicated to armed revolution, forged links with the militant Catholic peasant society, the Defenders, who had been raiding farmhouses since 1792. Wolfe Tone, the United Irish leader, went to France to seek French military support. These efforts bore fruit when the French launched an expeditionary force of 15,000 troops which arrived off Bantry Bay in December 1796, but failed to land due to a combination of indecisiveness, poor seamanship, and storms off the Bantry coast.

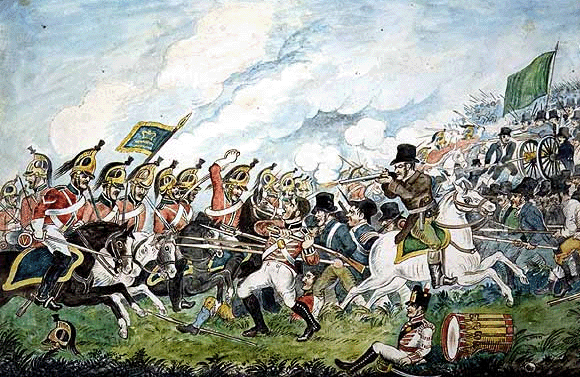
Battle of Vinegar Hill (21 June 1798) -"Charge of the 5th Dragoon Guards on the insurgents – a recreant yeoman having deserted to them in uniform is being cut down" – William Sadler (1782–1839)

Thereafter, the government began a campaign of repression targeted against the United Irishmen, including executions, routine use of torture, transportation to penal colonies and house burnings. As the repression began to bite, the United Irishmen decided to go ahead with an insurrection without French help. Their activity culminated in the Irish Rebellion of 1798. When the central core of the plan, an uprising in Dublin, failed, the rebellion then spread in an apparently random fashion firstly around Dublin, then briefly in Kildare, Meath, Carlow and Wicklow. County Wexford in the southeast then saw the most sustained fighting of the rebellion, to be briefly joined by rebels who took to the field in Antrim and Down in the north. A small French force landed in Killala Bay in County Mayo leading to a last outbreak of rebellion in counties Mayo, Leitrim and Longford. The rebellion lasted just three months before it was suppressed, but claimed an estimated 30,000 lives. Being the largest outburst of violence in modern Ireland, 1798 looms heavily in collective memory and was commemorated extensively in its centennial and bicentennial anniversaries.

The Republican ideal of a non-sectarian society was greatly damaged by sectarian atrocities committed by both sides during the rebellion. The British response was swift and harsh: days after the outbreak of the rebellion local forces publicly executed suspected United Irishmen in Dunlavin and Carnew. Government troops and militia targeted Catholics in general and the rebels on several occasions killed Protestant loyalist civilians. In Ulster, the 1790s were marked by naked sectarian strife between Catholic Defenders and Protestant groups like the Peep O'Day Boys and the newly founded Orange Order.

Largely in response to the rebellion, Irish self-government was abolished altogether from 1 January 1801 by the provisions of the Acts of Union 1800. The Irish Parliament, dominated by the Protestant landed class, was persuaded to vote for its own abolition for fear of another rebellion and with the aid of bribery by Lord Cornwallis, the Lord Lieutenant of Ireland. The Catholic Bishops, who had condemned the rebellion, supported the Union as a step on the road to further Catholic Emancipation.

== Culture ==
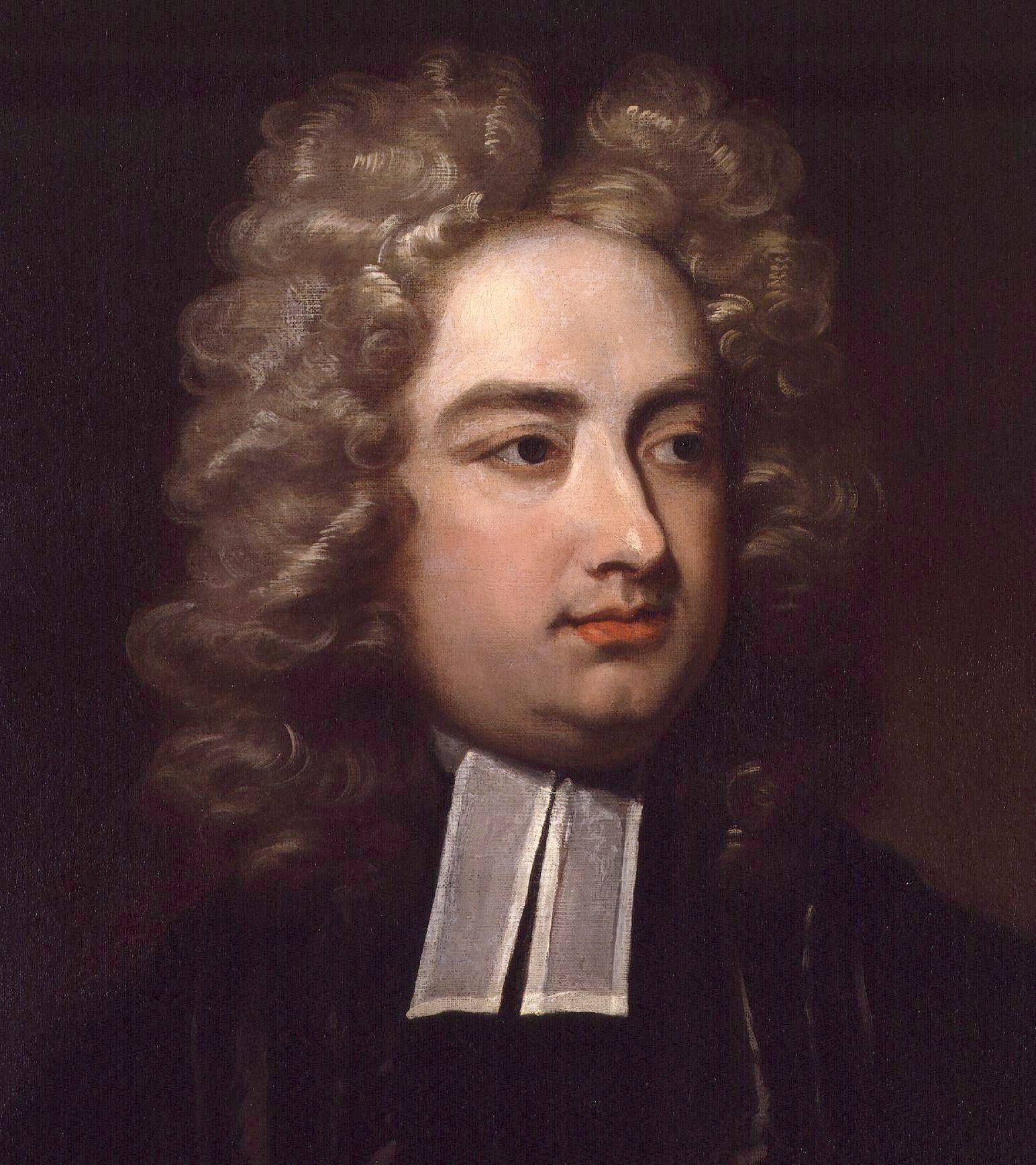
Jonathan Swift

Some historians argue that there were two cultures existing side by side in 18th century Ireland, which had little contact with each other. One was Catholic and Gaelic, the other Anglo-Irish and Protestant. In this period, there continued to be a vibrant Irish language literature, exemplified by the Aisling genre of Irish poetry. These were dream poems, typically featuring a woman representing Ireland who pleaded with the young men of Ireland to save her from slavery and oppression. Many Irish language poets clung to a romantic attachment to the Jacobite cause, although some wrote in praise of the United Irishmen in the 1790s. Other, non-political poetry could be quite sexually explicit, for example the poem Cuirt an Mean Oiche (the Midnight Court). Gaelic poets of this era include Aogán Ó Rathaille and Brian Merriman.

Anglo-Irish writers were also prolific in this period, notably Jonathan Swift, author of Gulliver's Travels. Of importance in the British Parliament, and in the history of conservatism, was political thinker Edmund Burke. One intellectual who crossed the cultural divide was John Toland, an Irish speaking Catholic from Donegal, who converted to Protestantism and became a leading philosopher in intellectual circles in Scotland, England, Germany and Bohemia. Much of Ireland's finest urban architecture also stems from this era, particularly in the cities of Dublin and Limerick.

== Legacy ==
This period in Irish history has been called "the long peace" and indeed for nearly one hundred years, there was little political violence in Ireland, in stark contrast to the previous two hundred years. Nevertheless, the period 1691–1801 began and ended in violence. By its close, the dominance of the Protestant Ascendancy that had ruled the country for 100 years was beginning to be challenged by an increasingly assertive Catholic population, and was ended by the Acts of Union 1800 that created the United Kingdom from January 1801. The violence of the 1790s had shattered the hopes of many radicals that the old sectarian divisions in Irish society could be forgotten. Presbyterians in particular largely abandoned their alliance with Catholics and radicals in the 19th century. Under the leadership of Daniel O'Connell, Irish nationalism would in the future be a more exclusively Catholic phenomenon. Many Protestants saw their continued pre-eminence in Irish society, and their hopes for the Irish economy, as being guaranteed only by the Union with Britain and became unionists.

== See also ==
- Category:17th-century Irish people
- Category:18th-century Irish people
