= Defenders (Ireland) =

Catholic secret society in 18th-century Ireland

- Na Cosantóirí
- Flag carried by Wexford Defenders and United Irishmen in the Irish Rebellion of 1798
- Dates active: 1784-1800
- Status: Secret lodge-based society

The Defenders (Irish: Na Cosantóirí) were a popular, oath-bound, society that reflected the range of Catholic grievance in late 18th-century Ireland. First formed as a vigilante response to the violence with which Protestants resisted competition for tenancies and employment in County Armagh, the Defenders spread rapidly as a lodge-based fraternity across Ulster and into Leinster and Dublin City. A campaign for Catholic emancipation that excited hopes of tax and rent relief, and resistance to militia conscription, broadened and politicised their membership. By 1796, the Defenders had allied with the United Irishmen, republicans who, making common cause against the landed Anglican ascendancy, drew them into the rebellion of 1798.

== Origins in Armagh ==
In 18th-century Ireland, there was a "varied, energetic and complex structure of agrarian 'secret societies'", commonly referred to as Whiteboyism, after groups that had emerged mid-century in Munster. Employing elaborate oaths and rituals, they bound tenant farmers and cottiers in covert acts of resistance to the rack-rents, tithes, and taxes levied by landlords, the "landlords' church" and county Grand Juries.

In the north, in Ulster, the phenomenon could be found (in the Oakboys and Hearts of Steel) among Protestants, particularly among the Ulster-Scot church "Dissenters", the Presbyterians. Whiteboyism was otherwise the protest of Ireland's dispossessed and penalised Catholic majority. While this was case for the Defenders, from the outset they represented a "sectarian alliance" broader than a conspiracy against process servers, tithe proctors, and tax assessors.

The Defenders emerged in the 1780s from a contest in mid-Ulster not, in the first instance, with landlords, their allies and agents, but with Protestants competing for the same tenancies and cottage employment. As a result of a relaxation of Penal Law restrictions on Catholic lease-holding, and of an influx of refugees from the intense poverty of Ireland's western counties, Protestants in County Armagh found themselves increasingly outbid on plots of land when their leases expired, and undercut in the already-depressed market for home-spun linen. On the pretext of searching for arms, prohibited to Catholics under the Penal Laws, some would respond by raiding Catholic homes, smashing spinning wheels and turning families out upon the roads. It was in the wake of one such night-time foray by the "Peep o'Day Boys" that, in 1784, the first posse of Defenders was formed near Ballymacnab. Supplied with arms illicitly purchased from a Protestant shopkeeper, local men embarked on night-watches and patrols.

Confrontations with the Peep o'Day Boys extended to fights at fairs, markets, and races, with Protestant magistrates and juries typically finding against the Defenders alone. In 1788, Lord Charlemont re-organised Armagh's existing Volunteer militia into new companies expressly committed to Catholic exclusion and to pan-Protestant unity. Volunteers from these companies moonlighted as Peep o'Day Boys, escalating the violence, and contributing to its increasingly indiscriminate sectarian character. To quell the "Armagh disturbances", in 1789 the government sent in the military, but under the cover of darkness the violence continued and spread across county lines.

== Spread and radicalisation ==
By 1790, Defenders were active across Ulster and the bordering counties in Leinster. Borrowing from the ritual and practice of Freemasonry, they organised in lodges, federated under county Grand Masters and committees. They had also taken a first step on a political path: their varied oaths, committing members to mutual assistance and to secrecy, carried a common pledge of allegiance to George the Third and his successors. The recognition of the Hanoverian succession (and the repudiation of the Jacobite cause) aligned the Defenders with a campaign for Catholic emancipation directed by the Catholic Committee in Dublin. Emboldened by news of revolution and reform in France, in December 1792, the Committee called delegates, returned from all thirty-two counties on a broad parish-based franchise, to a national Catholic Convention. Representations were then made directly, over the heads of the Irish parliament and executive, to the king and his ministers in London. In the run up to the Convention, the Defenders were said, in their own "little parliaments", to have raised expectations of what Catholic representation might bring.An inquiry by the Irish House of Lords confirmed that the talk was of "being relieved of hearth money, tithes, county cesses, and of lowering their rents".

Preparing for war with the new French Republic, London responded to what was understood as "a threat to the whole structure of government as it had existed [in Ireland] since the 1690s", by prevailing on Dublin to match the latest measure of Catholic Relief in Britain. Catholics were readmitted, not to Parliament, but to a parliamentary franchise whose freehold threshold in the counties of a forty-shillings would exclude all but a handful of their number. A (carefully circumscribed) right to bear arms was also restored. Amid "torrents of anti-papist rhetoric", these concessions were linked to a Convention Act, which effectively outlawed any further attempt to mobilise popular opinion (with the Catholic Committee itself agreeing to disband), and to a Militia Act that gave command of both Catholic and Protestant conscripts to local gentry.

Bitter disappointment at the limits of reform and riotous opposition to conscription saw thousands taking Defender oaths. These, increasingly, bore evidence of a political radicalisation. There was reference to the Rights of Man and to revolutionary France: "The French Defenders will uphold the cause. The Irish Defenders will pull down British laws". Those taking the oaths were now as likely to be market-town traders, journeymen and artisans as cottiers and farm tenants. In Dublin, Defender lodges helped organise a broad mix of the city's working and radically disaffected population.

== Principles and grievances ==
On Sunday the 12th of July, Laurence O’Connor was arrested in north Kildare on the charge of seducing militiaman from his duty with a "treasonous" oath. O'Connor, who had been a schoolteacher in the area, took opportunity in court to express his understanding of the abiding grievances and spirit of Defenderism. O'Connor spoke of taxes and oppressions of various descriptions, including that of cottiers who, unable to rent land directly from land-holders, were subject to the additional exactions of middlemen. He defined love as "that affection which the rich ought to shew to the poor in their distress"; liberty as "that liberty which every poor man had a right to use when oppressed by the rich"; and loyalty as "that union which subsisted among the poor". Sentenced to be hung, drawn and quartered, he refused to renounce Defenderism, and was consequently denied last rites by the attendant priest.

Already, in 1788, as a secret, oath-bound, society, the Defenders had been condemned in a pastoral letter by the Catholic Primate Archbishop of Armagh. Oaths, catechisms and articles of association supplied to Dublin Castle nonetheless suggested that the radicalisation of Defenders did not, of necessity, dilute confessional loyalty and sectarian sentiment. The allusions to what their bishops denounced, with threats of excommunication, as dangerous French principles, sat uneasily with calls to "plant the true religion". Oblivious to the anti-clericalism of the French Republic, many Defender rank-and-file viewed the French, and the prospect of French assistance, through a Jacobite, not Jacobin, lens.

== Armed confrontations ==
As the Catholic Convention broke up in Dublin, there was already a pattern Ascendancy houses, big and small, being raided by Defenders for arms. In January 1793, Dublin Castle had reports of forty farms being raided for weapons near Dundalk, County Louth. Alarmed by the sudden increase in Defender activity, Protestants in neighbouring Meath formed an impromptu county militia. Forty of their members, supported by 20 regular soldiers, approached a gathering of 600 Defenders at Coolnahinch, on the Meath-Cavan border, killing or mortally wounding 38. May 1793 saw open-field battles in County Leitrim. A raid on Carrick-on-Shannon, County Leitrim, was prevented when a large group of Defenders were overtaken and surrounded by a troop of dragoons. Ten were killed and one hundred and fifteen were taken prisoner. At Manorhamilton, it was reported that a mob of nearly 5,000 had entered the town, plundered the inhabitants of their arms and committed other "excesses". Withdrawing from the town, a group of Defenders were challenged by troops outside Drumkeen, again losing ten of their number.

Disturbances persisted through 1794. In May, Defenders descended upon the fair in Kilnaleck, County Cavan, declaring, according to loyalist reports, their intention to "destroy every Scotchman or Presbyterian they should find". Thirty are said to have died in the ensuing riot. Two days later, troops dispersed "several thousand’" nearby at Ballinaugh, killing 15 and burning the village. In July and August, there were further reports from Leitrim and Cavan, and of new disturbances in Westmeath, Longford, Roscommon and Sligo.

The most celebrated Defender engagement (being a loss to their original nemesis, the Peep o'Day Boys) came in September 1795. In the Battle of the Diamond, near Loughgall in County Armagh, the Peep o'Day Boys, armed with Volunteer muskets, put a large body of Defenders to flight, killing thirty. Victory was celebrated in Loughgall with the inaugural meeting of the Orange Order, a sworn association pledged to defend "the King and his heirs so long as he or they support the Protestant Ascendancy". Meanwhile, of the 7,000 Catholics who subsequently displaced from the county, some found shelter on Presbyterian farms in counties Down and Antrim organised by a new group of Volunteer veterans in Belfast, the Society of United Irishmen. The "United men" were pledged to "a brotherhood of affection" and "a union of power among Irishmen of every religious persuasion".

== Alliance with the United Irishmen ==
Defenders and United Irishmen began to seek one another out. Religion was not invariably a bar to joining the Defenders, and closer ties began take the form of joint membership. In Dublin, in particular, where the Defenderism appealed strongly to a significant body of radical artisans and shopkeepers, Protestants (Napper Tandy and other United Irishmen among them) joined in the determination to make common cause. Early in 1796, the Dublin Defenders sent a delegation to the largely Presbyterian directory of the United societies in Belfast for the purpose of laying a "foundation" for a union between parties that, while equally hostile to the state, had been "kept wholly distinct".

Although James Hope, Thomas Russell and Henry Joy McCracken travelled Ulster and midlands seeking to win over the Defenders, recognising the sectarian tensions (Robert Simms reported that "it would take a great deal of exertion" to keep the Defenders from "producing feuds"), the Belfast directory chose emissaries from their small number of Catholic members: Bartholomew and Charles Teeling, sons of a wealthy linen manufacturer, and brothers-in-law to the Defenders' County Down "Grand Master", John Magennis, and (when not cultivating radical support in England) the Armagh priest James Coigly.

Defenders were not necessarily persuaded by the, relatively abstract, promise of "real" independence from Britain. The Crown's martial-law commander in Tyrone, General John Know, reported that republicans were "obliged to throw in the bait of the Abolition of Tithes, Reduction of Rents etc.". Nothing less would rouse "the lower orders of Roman Catholics".

== In the Rebellion of 1798 ==
On the morning of June 7, 1798, Defenders rallied to the United Irish command of James Dickey in the siege and capture of a government garrison in Randalstown, County Antrim. They reportedly carried a flag emblazoned "Remember Armagh". By the end of the day, the rebels had dispersed on news that Dickey's county commander, Henry Joy McCracken, had failed, leading a much larger force of 6,000, to take Antrim Town.

There were reports that as McCracken marched upon the town, Defenders had been driven from the rebel ranks by sectarian taunts. This notwithstanding, James Hope had encouraged Protestant membership of the Defenders, and in the aftermath of the defeat the movement's cell structure provided Protestant irreconcilables refuge, enabling them to maintain (as later celebrated in Ethna Carbery's ballad "Roddy McCorley") an outlaw existence until March 1800.

In the rebellion that followed in County Down, there was also a story of sectarian division. Defenders were said to have deserted the United command of Henry Munro on the eve of the Battle at Ballynahinch (12 June 1798). The most sympathetic account has John Magennis decamping with his followers only after Munro rejected as ungentlemanly his proposal for a preemptive night-time attack. Not a witness himself (he fought at Antrim, not Ballynahinch), James Hope denied the tale. He insisted that Defenders had not appeared among the rebels in separate ranks, and that the body that deserted Munro on the eve of battle had been "the Killinchy people ... and they were Dissenters". Noting that in Down, Catholics had a formal parity in the United organisation (accounting for three of the county's six "colonels"), historian Marianne Elliott has also cast doubt on the existence of separate Defender divisions. With the United organiser and Volunteer veteran, Alexander Lowry, Magennis had made a concerted effort in the county to "create a joint movement".

Defenders were present in rebel turnouts in the midland counties, but in demonstrations that were rapidly and brutally suppressed by Crown forces. Success attended rebels forces only in the south-east, in County Wexford, where the Defenderism had lately taken hold. On May 27, they had been led to victory at Oulart Hill by a Catholic priest, Fr. John Murphy who subsequently submitted to the United-Irish command of Bagenal Harvey, a Protestant barrister. Harvey's strategy was to break through at New Ross to the large bodies of Defenders he believed stood ready in counties Kilkenny and Waterford. In the aftermath of his defeat at New Ross, rebels in the rear massacred loyalist prisoners at Scullabogue and at Wexford Bridge. Reports of the outrages helped the authorities to discredit the Defenders and induce Protestant defections from the republican cause.

In August, Defenders were among the 5,000 "uncombed, ragged" and shoeless peasants who rallied around a French expeditionary force that landed in the west, at Kilcummin, County Mayo. It is "highly probable" that many would have been drawn from the "colony" of northern weavers who, having fled the sectarian violence in mid-Ulster, had driven a rapid expansion Defenderism in the region. Unable to reignite a wider insurrection, after less than three weeks in the field, the French commander, General Humbert, surrendered his forces to the British at Ballinamuck, in County Longford. Along with their commander, Bartholomew Teeling, the veteran of "unionising" among Defenders in Ulster, 500 of Humbert's Irish auxiliaries were led to their execution. What was recalled in the Irish-speaking region as Bliain na bhFrancach (the year of the French), concluded with slaughter of some 2000 poorly-armed insurgents outside Killala on September 23.

== Response to the call to renew the rebellion in 1803 ==
In July 1803, Robert Emmet and his reconstituted United Irish directory in Dublin, sent Thomas Russell north to rally support for the rebellion they hoped to reignite with an uprising in the capital. Unable to persuade his former comrades, Russell moved into the heart of what had been Defender territory in south Down. Dressed in his green uniform, he was greeted on a hill near Downpatrick by just three men. One of these one responded to Russell's promise of French arms with the suggestion that Ireland might as well be an English colony, as a French one.

Desperate to recruit support, in Annadorn and Loughinisland Russell is said to have played on anti-Orange sentiments, but with equally little effect. Nowhere else in country did veterans of either the Defender, or of the United, movement stir (save perhaps for their presence among a small turnout in Kildare) when Emmet made his attempt in Dublin.

== Successors ==
There does not appear to be a record of Defender activity after 1800. The rise in agricultural prices during the Napoleonic wars eased agrarian tensions, but when these collapsed at war's end it is likely that former Defenders would have contributed to the renewal of agitation represented in the 1820s by such groups as the Ribbonmen and the Rockites. Again secret societies of Catholic tenant farmers and farm labourers, and their market-town allies, they attacked tithe proctors and process servers. Like the Defenders, the Ribbonmen, organised in lodges, and they sought out political allies. These included, in what was now the United Kingdom of Great Britain and Ireland, Radicals in England.

== Sources ==
- Thomas Bartlett, Kevin Dawson, Daire Keogh, "Rebellion", Dublin 1998
- Liam Kelly "A Flame now Quenched: Rebels and Frenchmen in Leitrim 1793–98", Dublin 1998
- David Miller "Peep O' Day Boys and Defenders", Belfast 1990
