= Battle of Gilford =

Battle of Gilford may refer to:

- Battle of Gilford, a 1772 confrontation between the Hearts of Steel and the landlord of Gilford estate, County Antrim, Ireland.
- Battle of Guilford Court House, an American Revolutionary War battle in 1781, Guilford County, North Carolina.
