= Hearts of Steel =

Protestant movement in Ireland

The Hearts of Steel, or Steelboys, was an exclusively Protestant movement originating in 1769 in County Antrim, Ireland due to grievances about the sharp rise of rents and evictions. The protests then spread into the neighbouring counties of Armagh, Down, and Londonderry, before being put down by troops, including British Army contingents. (Note: As distinct from units of the Irish Army (1661–1801).)

The Hearts of Steel organisation of County Antrim used a hammer and sickle emblem during their anti-landlord campaign. (Note: The sickle had come to symbolise Irish farmers.)

== Origins ==
The Hearts of Steel rose in 1769 against unjust and exorbitant rents, chiefly exacted by middlemen—speculators or "forestallers"—who took lands from absentee landlords at greatly increased rents, and made their own profit by doubling the rents on the poor tenants.

In 1770 in Templepatrick, County Antrim a local landlord evicted tenants and replaced them with speculators who could outbid the locals for the land. At some point, a local was arrested and charged with maiming cattle belonging to a merchant from Belfast, which spurred the farmers of Templepatrick to take up arms and march on Belfast to demand his release. The protestors surrounded the barracks and threatened to burn the house of Waddell Cunningham, who was one of the new speculators in Templepatrick. The soldiers in the barracks fired upon the protestors killing several and wounding others. The protestors eventually set fire to Cunningham's house and as the fire threatened to spread and destroy the town of Belfast itself, its mayor decided to free the prisoner.

Further consternation was caused by the sharp increase in rents throughout Ulster. At the same time, the leases had expired for Lord Donegall's south County Antrim estate. Whilst he kept his rent at the old prices, he greatly increased their renewal fee. These coincided with several years of severe harvest failures, which resulted in high bread prices. The result of this was that people were unable to support themselves or their families, being left in the utmost state of deprivation and destitution, with many evicted from their land for failure to pay.

== Spread ==
The Hearts of Steel protests and uprisings quickly spread throughout the county and into counties Armagh, Down, and Londonderry, which were also subject to the Hearts of Oak protest movement which it merged with. One tactic of the protestors was the "houghing" of cattle (cutting the leg tendons) thus laming them. They also forced farmers to sell food at prices they set, and demanded anyone letting out land to do so at the cost of 12 shillings an acre. Landlords were threatened that if they tried to collect the cess from anyone, their houses would be destroyed.

== The Battle of Gilford ==
A band of Hearts of Steel, numbering around 800, held a demonstration in Gilford, County Down, on 2 March 1772, consisting of marching through the village and past the castle, home of the local Gilford estate owner, Richard Johnston. On 5 March, the local Presbyterian minister, Rev. Samuel Morrell had informed Johnston that the "leading deputies" of the Hearts of Steel were meeting in the townland of The Clare, part of Johnston's estate. They raided the house and arrested the alleged deputies, with one escaping. This escapee raised the alarm and the next day between one and two thousand Steelboys from Gilford and neighbouring Lurgan and Portadown converged on the village at the castle of Johnston.

Despite a plea from Johnston for diplomacy, a half-hour gun battle erupted between the Hearts of Steel and the defenders of the castle resulting in the burning of the gardener's house and the death of Morrell. Johnston failed with attempts to send out a flag of truce and so decided to flee, making a break from the castle and swimming across the River Bann, pursued the whole way. After gathering 150 men Johnston sought to confront the protestors, however, by then 4,000 were waiting for him at neighbouring Loughbrickland.

The aftermath of this battle resulted in Johnston returning to Gilford with a company of soldiers, only to find that his castle and demesne had been wrecked, with damage estimated at being £2,200. Despite their victory, the Hearts of Steel would face a heavy army response, with Johnston himself taking it upon himself to hunt down the ringleaders of the trouble. Eventually, they were brought to trial in Dublin as due to either sympathy for or fear of the protestors in Ulster meant that convictions were hard to secure. In the end, they were found not guilty.

== End of the protests ==
The disturbances became so widespread in the affected counties that in March 1772 the Parliament of Ireland passed a Bill aiming to punish severely the "wicked and disorderly persons". Troops went into Ulster to crush the Steelboys. Men were hanged, whilst many others are said to have drowned trying to flee across the sea to Scotland. The viceroy of Ireland, Lord Townshend (in office until October 1772) privately blamed the landlords and their actions for the disturbances and so issued a general pardon in November 1772. Some surviving discontented Ulster Protestants reacted by emigrating to the American colonies, "where they started new 'Hearts' organizations and went on to fight in numbers against the British in the American Revolution".

== See also ==
- Agrarian society
- Defenders (Ireland)
- Hearts of Oak (Ireland)
- Irish Volunteers (18th century)
- Molly Maguires
- Peep o' Day Boys
- Orange Order
- Ribbonism
- United Irishmen
- Whiteboys
- Captain Rock
