= Hearts of Oak (Ireland) =

The Hearts of Oak, also known as the Oakboys and the Greenboys, was a protest movement of farmers and weavers arising in County Armagh, Ireland in 1761. Their grievances were the ever-increasing county cess (tax), tithes, and "small dues". The Hearts of Oak name came from the wearing of a piece of oak in their hats. By the end of the protests the movement had spread to the neighbouring counties of Cavan, Fermanagh, Londonderry, Monaghan, and Tyrone.

== Origins and grievances ==
The movement started in 1761 in County Armagh, Ireland's then most populous county. The original cause of unrest was that every man was forced to give six days' work in the year and six days' work of a horse, for making or repairing roads, which the gentry often turned to their own use, while they themselves contributed nothing.

The chief grievance appears to have been the turnpike toll gates, which the Oakboys went about demolishing. In 1763 the county cess was increased to help pay for improvements in the country's transport network, needed due to the rapid expansion of the linen industry in Ulster. Another vehement grievance was the tithe to the state church, the Church of Ireland, levied on the local population regardless of religion. Along with this was the payment of "small dues": a fee was paid by Catholics and Presbyterians to the Church of Ireland for marriages, baptisms and funerals, whether occurring there or in their own church.

== Activity ==
There are accounts, quite possibly exaggerated, claiming some Hearts of Oak gatherings were of as many as 10,000 people. One account claimed that there was no town in County Armagh that could not raise four or five hundred. Whilst many joined voluntarily, the Hearts of Oak frequently intimidated many others to join, though this appears to have been a community sanction. Others were attracted by the carnival-like nature of their gatherings, with companies of Oakboys displaying standards and playing drums, horns, bagpipes, and fiddles.

The main tactic, once assembled, appears to have been to march to the houses of local gentlemen such as landlords, clergy, and magistrates and make them swear an oath and sign a declaration relating to the grievance, relying on the threat of violence. It is recorded that they put up gallows and threatened to hang any who refused to meet their demands; due to the size of these gatherings those threatened readily complied. A two-stage process developed, with gentlemen being summoned to public places to make their declaration, and being marched upon if they failed to appear. Despite the threatening language and symbolism used, and most likely due to their vast numbers, they rarely, if ever, had to resort to physical violence.

Hearts of Oak activity declined in County Armagh through 1763, as their demands were met by the county magistrates; this success is claimed as causing the movement to grow in strength in neighbouring counties. In County Londonderry, many rectors and tithe collectors fled to the city of Derry for protection; the Hearts of Oak threatened to besiege the city unless they were expelled.

== End of the protests ==
By the middle of July 1763, the government of Ireland, worried by the Hearts of Oak's progress, dispatched troops to the affected counties. Whilst in some areas their presence was enough to suppress the movement, active operations were required to end demonstrations and marches elsewhere. This led to a few bloody confrontations which saw several Oakboys killed and many others arrested.

A general pardon was issued at the start of August 1763 for all Hearts of Oak who would return to their homes, and by the end of August, the movement had been subdued. This pardon however excluded those who had already been arrested or previously indicted, some of whom were considered to require "exemplary" punishment. The trials descended into farce, with only one defendant found guilty, possibly because the charges laid were of treason, bearing the death penalty, which petty juries disliked; it is suggested that jurors were sympathetic to the movement. The sole Oakboy found guilty had been accused of treating a clergyman "very ill".

Despite some small degree of sectarianism in rhetoric, the movement comprised aggrieved Anglicans, Presbyterians, and Roman Catholics. Despite that, the Church of Ireland, to which the vast majority of gentlemen belonged, blamed the Presbyterians. The local Presbyterian churches responded with notices calling on their members to remember their loyalty and obedience to peace and demanding to be absolved of blame.

== See also ==
- Agrarian society
- Defenders (Ireland)
- Hearts of Steel
- Irish Volunteers (18th century)
- Molly Maguires
- Peep o' Day Boys
- Orange Order
- Ribbonism
- United Irishmen
- Whiteboys
- Captain Rock
