= British Army during the Georgian Era =

British army 1714 to 1799

Georgian British Army
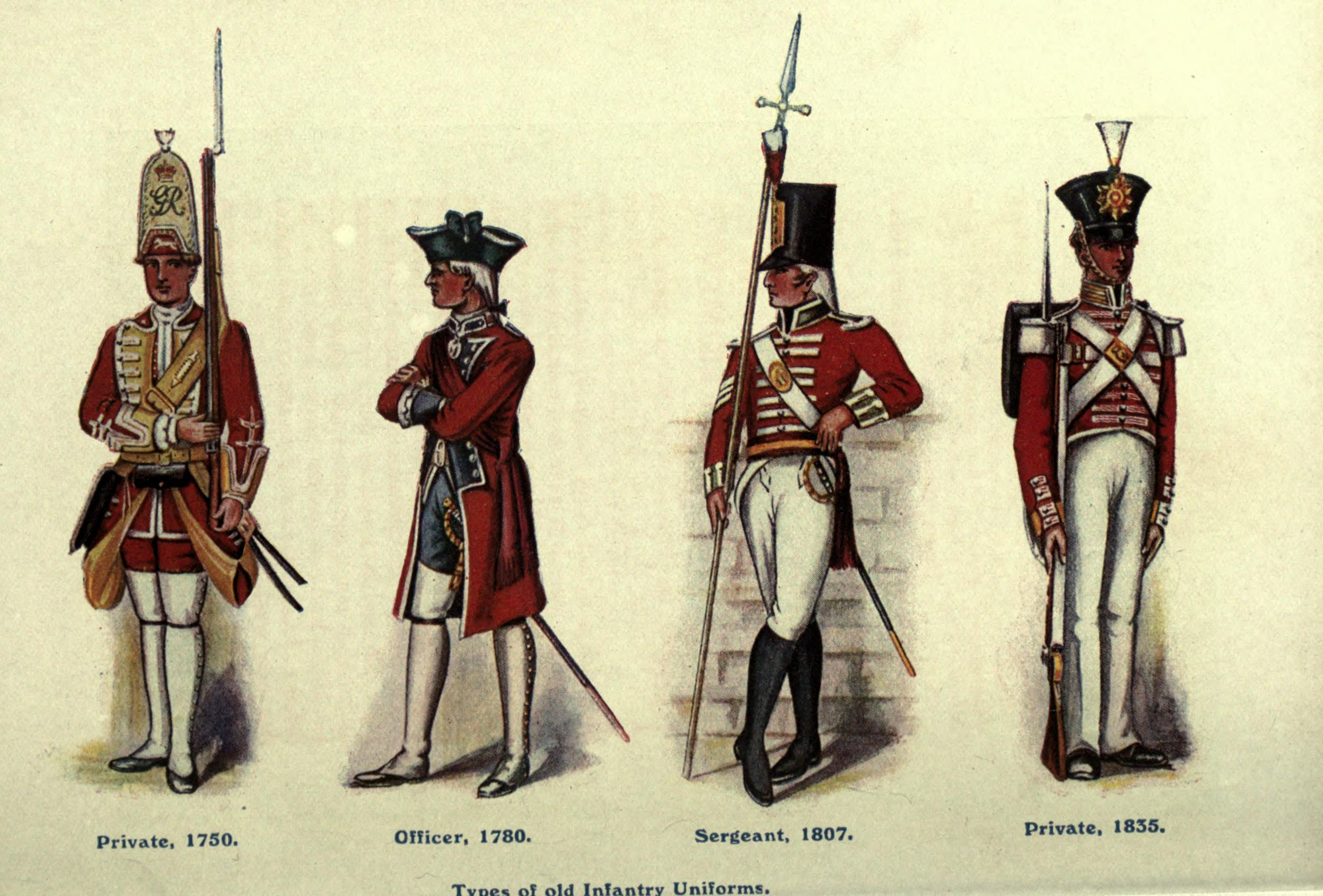
- Evolution of the Uniforms and Equipment
- Active: 1714–1799
- Country: Kingdom of Great Britain
- Allegiance: British Crown
- Branch: Army
- Type: Infantry; cavalry; artillery
- Size: 1714: 30,000; 1759: 120,000; 1799: 179,000
- Nickname: Redcoats
- Engagements: War of Austrian Succession; Seven Years' War; American Revolution

The British Army during the Georgian Era served through a period of political and economic changes with large expansions of the empire, introducing new colonies. It was a transformative century, bridging the 18th and 19th century British dominance in the world. It saw monarchy with limited parliamentary power into a global empire with industrial foundations, cultural diversity and modernized military.

There were many political changes, beginning with the reign of King George I in 1714, Britain shifted to a new dynasty of Hanoverian succession. Prime Ministers like Robert Walpole strengthened the parliament's role, reducing direct royal influence. Britain fought four major wars, Austrian Succession, Seven Year's War, American Revolution and Napoleonic Wars. The agricultural revolution boosted innovation and brought industrial revolution, the EIC company started dominating south Asian markets and made the United Kingdom a global trading power.

== Ranks and organization ==
The army was organized by clear hierarchy of officers, non-commissioned officers, and enlisted men. Promotion and commissions were rather provided by social status and purchase rather than merit.

=== Officers ===
The army had various roles for officers, some were auxiliaries while many were combat ones. The commissions (officer ranks) were usually purchased rather than merit. Officers were drawn from aristocracy and royalty in the army, or usually till late 1750s aristocrats used to raise regiments for the crown during wars. The army had junior officers that started from an ensign/cornet the lowest commissioned rank in the army, whose responsibility was to carry the King's Colours or the regimental flags. It was followed by a lieutenant, usually one per company, assisted the captain or commanded a platoon. The seniormost junior officer was a captain, whose responsibility was to command a company. The field officers' responsibility was to supervise the companies under the regiment. The lowest field rank was a major, a major usually lead the battalion to the battlefield or assisted the lieutenant colonel. The lieutenant colonel commanded the battalion, and at most times the assisted the colonel or acted as a colonel. The regiment had two colonels, one an honorary colonel who would mostly be a nobleman or would have raised the regiment as during wars aristocrats raised regiments with by financing them and the army used to provide veterans, so it was important to provide an honorary rank to the aristocrat, and the other colonel was the commanded officer of the regiment who served the crown. The army had general officers who oversaw larger field formations. The colonel commandant (brigadier general) was a temporary rank or authority given to a colonel who would for a particular engagement or war command a brigade, and would return to his original rank as a colonel after that if not promoted in line engagements. It was also a specialist or senior rank in the Royal Engineers and the Royal Artillery. The first substantive general rank was a major general. He commanded and supervised a division(2–3 brigades). The lieutenant general was senior to major general and commanded a corps(2–3 divisions). The general was the seniormost rank in the army, there was only one general who was the commander in chief of army, who commanded the whole army. The field marshal was an honorary rank usually which was given to generals who distinguished in service.

=== Non-commissioned officers ===
The NCOs maintained discipline and order rank and file, they oversaw drill, training and battle cohesion. Unlike officers NCOs were promoted on merit, performance and leadership rather than purchase.

Corporal was a junior NCO who assisted the sergeant and let commanded a line of fire (10-18 men), usually 3-4 per company. A sergeant was a senior NCO who maintained order in a company and conveyed orders, 2-3 per company. Sergeant major was the senior most NCO of the regiment, who maintained order and discipline in the regiment.

=== Specialist roles ===
The army had many roles, beyond men for combat, men, who raised morale or acted as auxiliaries. A chaplain provided spirituous services and morale guidance to soldiers in mist of wars. A surgeon was a commissioned medical officer who treated wounds, managed diseases and oversaw regimental hospitals. A quartermaster who managed supplies, equipment and oversaw logistics. The paymaster was supposed to keep accounts of paying the soldiers their daily wages. An adjutant would keep records, issue orders and coordinate communication in the army. The drum major would supervise the drummers and fifers, and relay battlefield signals. Judge advocates were necessary in the army to oversee court martials and military justices to maintain disciple. The advocates were helped by the provost marshal of the army, who would command the military police. The would also be a commissary who verified muster roles, prevented fraud, managed ordinance and weapons at army level. Most of these specialist ranks above are on regimental level, they were supervised by their deputy generals on brigade and divisional levels, and by the general of their branch on the army level.

=== Organization and promotions ===
The army was organized in many units; all were commanded by an NCO or an officer. The files were enlisted men and the ranks were officers.

Unit	Strength	Commanding ranks
Line of Fire	8-12 Men	Corporal
Platoon	16-24 Men	Sergeant/ Lieutenant
Company	47 Men	Captain
Battalion	10 Companies(480-600 men)	Major/ Lieutenant Colonel
Regiment	1-2 Battalions	Colonel
Brigade	3-6 Battalions(1500-3000 men)	Colonel Commandant
Division	2-3 Brigades(5000-9000 men)	Major General
Corps	2-3 Divisions(15000-30000 men)	Lieutenant General
Army	2-3 Corps	General/ Field Marshal

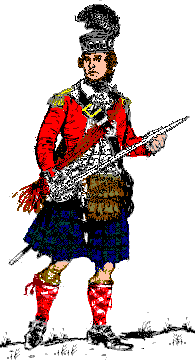
Officer of the 71st Regiment of Foot, 1776

=== Promotion ===
Most promotion commissions were usually purchased but exceptions were there, promotions for merit and exceptional leadership or distinguished service were there though rare. Ranks above colonel were granted by royal parchments or charters by the crown. For NCOs it was a slow process, they rose through ranks by ability, vacancy, literacy and leadership. Corporal to sergeant, sergeant to major sergeant, it was rare for a NCO to be promoted to an officer, though was possible.

== Uniforms and insignia ==
=== Rank distinction ===
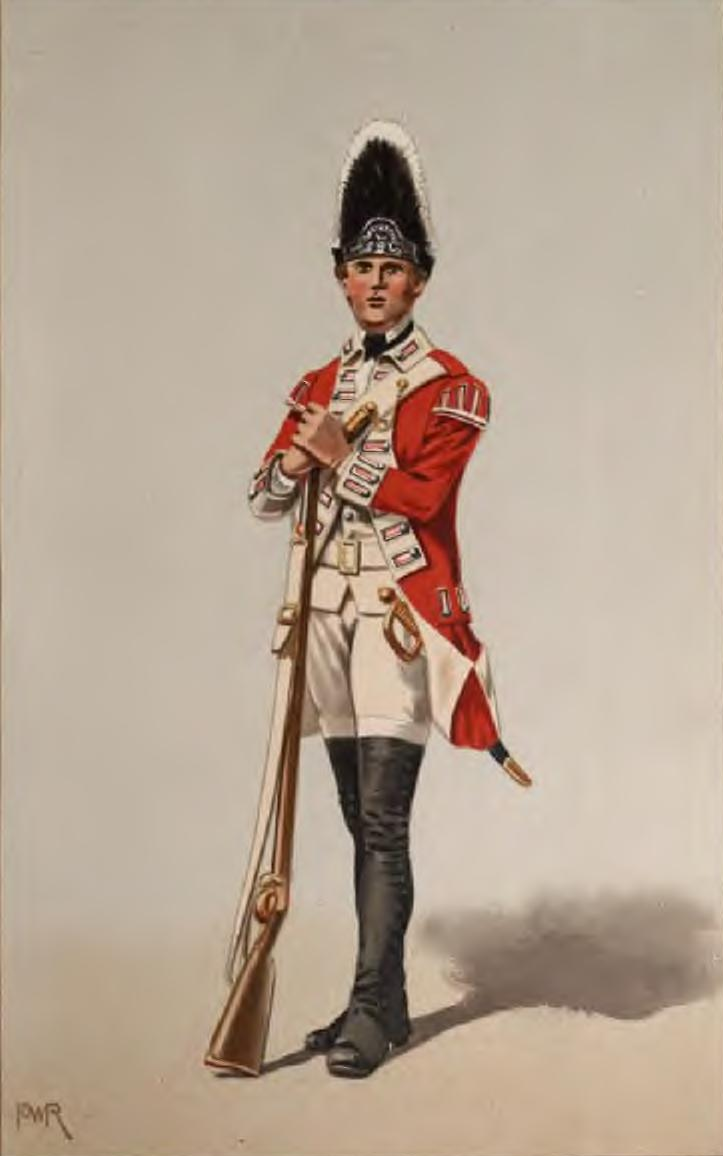
Grenadier of the 40th Regiment of Foot, 1767

Soldiers had scarlet coats with facings, each regiment had distinctive facing colours (collars, cuffs, lapels) and button patterns. The guards, royal regiments and fusiliers had blue facings, line infantry and highlands had yellow, buff, black and white and green, light infantry had green and the cavalry had blue or buffed facings . Gold and silver lace marked officer status, with more elaborate decoration for senior ranks. Sashes were used for officers and NCOs, crimson for infantry and gold for cavalry wore around the waist or shoulder. Gorgets and epaulettes were also worn. NCOs had chevrons on sleeves, some senior NCOs also carried a cane or baton (halberds for most sergeants).

=== Insignia ===
The army did not employ standardized patches or badges. Instead, regimental identity was expressed through colours, facings and devices. Each regiment carried two flags: King's Colour, bearing the Union Flag with regiment's number and regimental emblems, and the Regimental Colours, bearing the regiment's facing colours and isignia. Officers were distinguished by gorgets, sashes, and later epaulettes, while NCOs displayed chevrons on their sleeve.

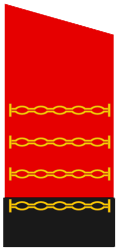
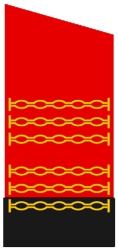
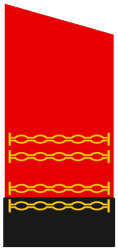
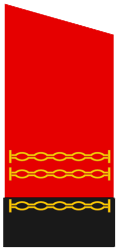
General officers				Field officers			Junior officers
General	Lieutenant-general	Major-general	Colonel Commandant	Colonel	Lieutenant-colonel	Major	Captain	Lieutenant	Ensign

== War and campaigns ==
The army had fought wars on various fronts,mostly against the French, throughout the War of Austrian Succession, American Revolution, and the French Revolution, the army was engaged with French on colonial and continental campaigns.

=== War of Austrian Succession ===
Triggered by the contested succession of the throne of Maria Theresa to the Hasburg throne, this war drew in most European powers. Britain supported Austria against France, Prussia and Spain.

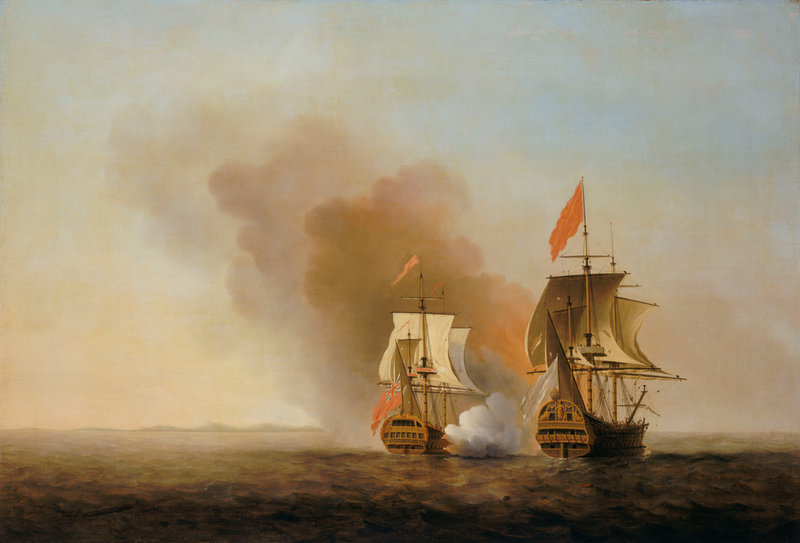
Ships piracy during the Austrian Succession

British troops fought at Dettingen under the command of King George II, which was the last battle in which a British monarch commanded the army to the field.

The war concluded on the Treaty of Aix-la-Chapelle, which restored territories but left Silesea to Prussia, highlighting the growth of British reliance on alliances.

=== Seven Years' War ===
The Seven Years' War, often called the, "First World War" in Europe, it spawned in Europe, North America, Asia and Africa. Britain allied with Prussia against France, Austria and Spain. The war lasted for seven years, and victories like Plassey and Quebec brought bend with the Treaty of Paris, giving Britain the supremacy of Canada, India and Florida.

=== American Revolution ===
Sparked by colonial resistance to taxation without representation, the War Pitted the crown against it Thirteen Colonies, supported by France and Spain. Despite early success, Britain suffered at Saratoga and Yorktown, marking an end of the crown's control over the Thirteen Colonies with the Treaty of Paris.

=== French Revolution ===
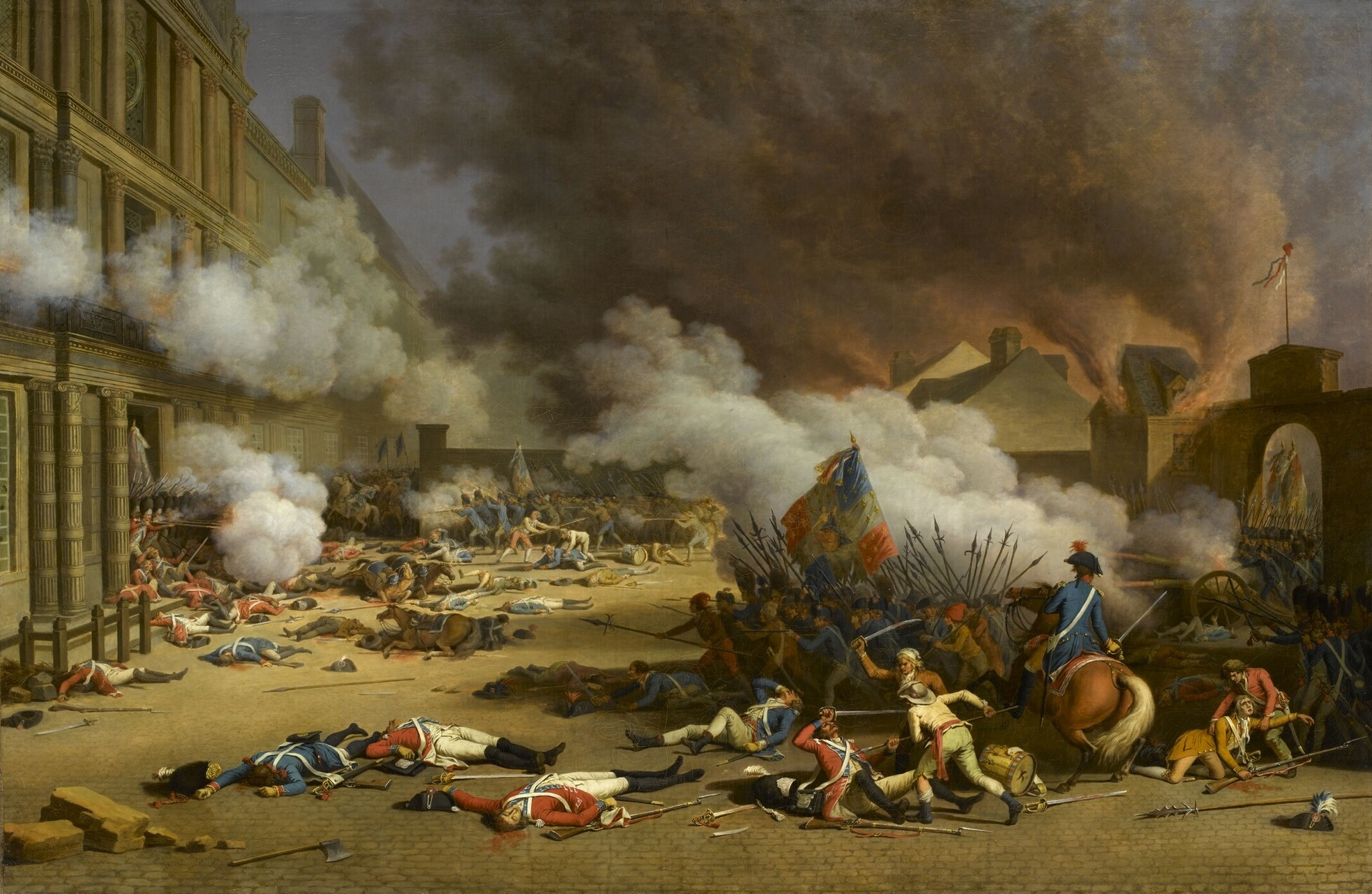
Storming of the Tuileries Palaces during the French Revolution (1792)

The outbreak of the French Revolution destabilised Europe and brought wars between the monarchies of Europe and the revolutionists. Britain entered the conflict. In 1793, with the First Coalition, the army fought in campaigns in the lowland countries, Mediterranean, and the West Indies. This ended with the Treaty of Amiens.
