= Protestantism in Ireland =

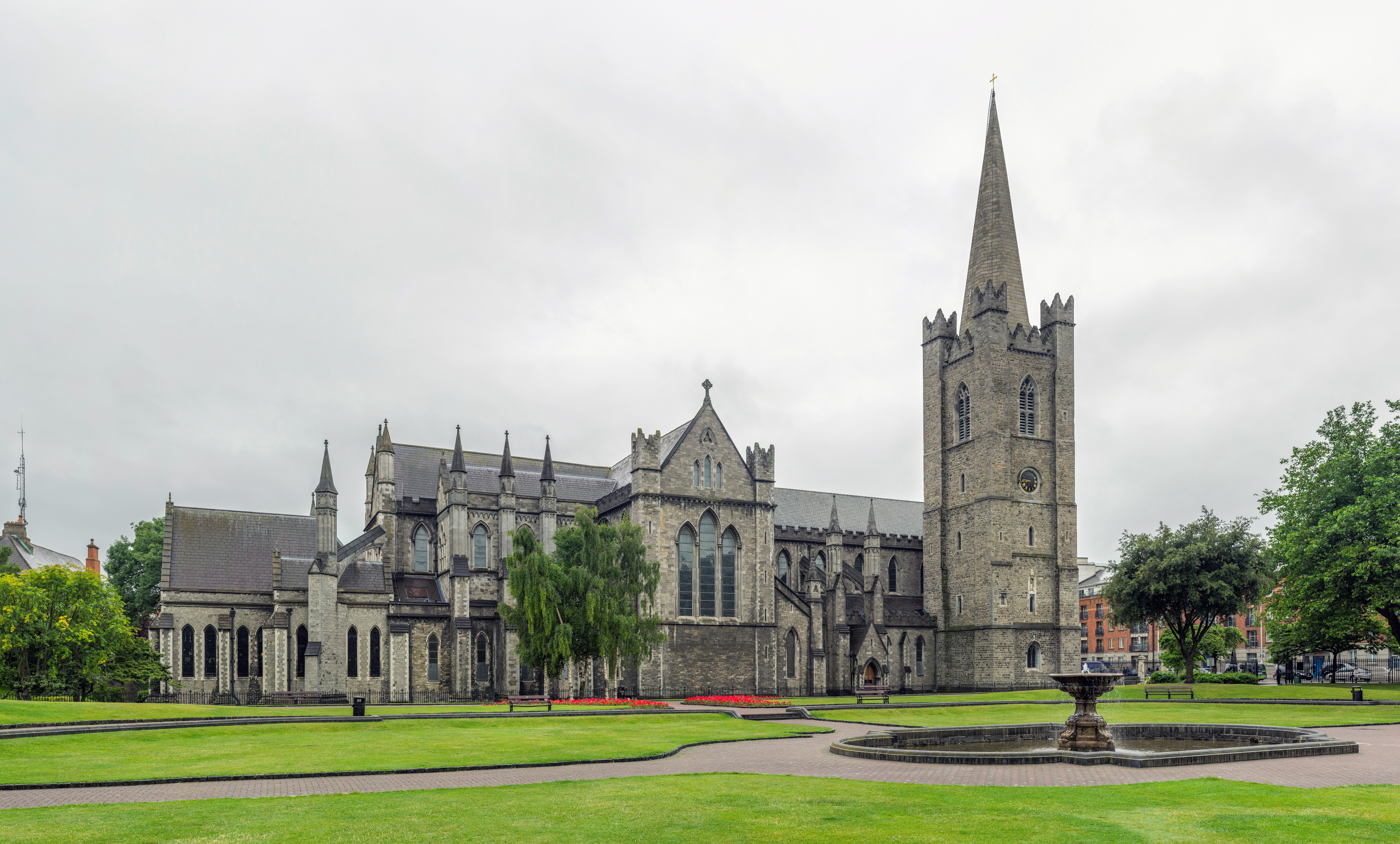
The Church of Ireland's national Cathedral and Collegiate Church of Saint Patrick, Dublin

Protestantism is a Christian community on the island of Ireland. In the 2011 census of Northern Ireland, 48% (883,768) described themselves as Protestant, which was a decline of approximately 5% from the 2001 census. In the 2011 census of the Republic of Ireland, 4.27% of the population described themselves as Protestant. In the Republic, Protestantism was the second largest religious grouping until the 2002 census in which they were exceeded by those who chose "No Religion". Some forms of Protestantism existed in Ireland in the early 16th century before the English Reformation, but demographically speaking, these were very insignificant and the real influx of Protestantism began only with the spread of the English Reformation to Ireland. The Church of Ireland was established by King Henry VIII of England, who had himself proclaimed as King of Ireland.

== History ==
=== Reformation in Ireland ===
During the English Reformation in the 1530s, the Irish Parliament gained the support of some bishops for royal supremacy. This led to the passing of the Act of Supremacy in 1536, which declared King Henry VIII of England to be the head of the Church of Ireland. In 1539, Henry dissolved the monasteries in Ireland. Only Christ Church in Dublin survived this dissolution by changing its constitution from one of monasticism to a secular one that was based on that of Saint Patrick. The introduction of the Reformation to Ireland is regarded as the end of the medieval period in Ireland. During the reign of Henry VIII's son, Edward VI, attempts were made to introduce Protestant liturgy and bishops to Ireland. However, this met with hostility within the Church and was opposed even by those who had previously conformed.

A return to Catholic supremacy ensued during the reign of Queen Mary I, in the 1550s. However, in 1560, her half-sister and successor Queen Elizabeth I enacted a religious settlement consisting of an Act of Supremacy and Act of Uniformity in an attempt to impose Protestantism. Elizabeth made herself the supreme governor of the Church of Ireland. With few exceptions the Irish Catholic hierarchy conformed. During Elizabeth's reign, the bulk of Protestants in Ireland were confined to the ranks of new settlers and government officials, who formed a small minority of the population. Elizabeth's reign saw the introduction of a Gaelic printing typeface (1571) for the purpose of evangelisation; the establishment of Trinity College, Dublin, to train ministers (1592); and the first translation of the New Testament into Irish (1603).

Despite all this, the Reformation ground to a halt and ultimately failed. Some reasons for this failure include: a dedicated and vigorous campaign by Continentally-trained Catholic priests; failure to make use of the Irish language, the native tongue of around 90% of the population; and the alienation of the Old English in political developments and the view amongst the Gaelic Irish that this was another attempt by the English at conquest and forced Anglicisation. The dissolution of the monasteries saw the property of many parishes granted to lay people whose main concern was economic rather than spiritual; this, along with the wars that raged in Ireland throughout the 16th and 17th centuries left many parish churches—now the property of the Established Church (especially rural ones), in a ruinous state.

=== 17th century ===
==== Puritans ====
During the reigns of both Elizabeth I and James VI & I, some English Puritans and many Scottish Presbyterians settled in Ireland. Despite both groups then being persecuted for their beliefs at home, in Ireland they were openly welcomed by the state-sponsored Church of Ireland as fellow Protestants and for their dedication to preaching, which it highly sought.

==== Early 17th century ====
Throughout the reigns of Elizabeth I and James I, several plantations occurred seeing the arrival of British settlers, the majority of which were Protestant.

In 1604, the Scottish Catholic Randal MacDonnell, set about settling his lands in the Route and Glynnes in County Antrim with Protestants from the Scottish Lowlands. This was followed by the considerably determined private plantation of counties Antrim and Down by James Hamilton and Sir Hugh Montgomery, which saw English and Scottish Protestants settling in their estates. In 1606, the notorious Border reiver clan of the Grahams of Eskdale, Leven and Sark, were invited to settle in County Roscommon.

By 1607 a steady supply of Scottish Protestants were migrating to eastern Ulster, settling on the estates of Hamilton, MacDonnell, and Montgomery. Whilst many Presbyterian Lowlanders fled Kintyre in Scotland for MacDonnell's lands, Hebridean Catholics migrated as well, ensuring that the Glens of Antrim would remain Catholic as the rest of the county became predominantly Protestant.

That same year, the Flight of the Earls occurred, which saw vast tracts of land in Ulster spanning the counties of Armagh, Cavan, Coleraine, Donegal, Fermanagh, and Tyrone, escheated to James VI & I. This was followed by the Plantation of Ulster, which saw Protestant British settlers colonise these counties. In 1610, The Honourable The Irish Society was established to undertake and finance the plantation of the new county of Londonderry (made up of County Coleraine and parts of Antrim, Donegal, and Tyrone) with British Protestant subjects. Whilst a substantial number of English and Scottish people did come over and settle during the Plantation of Ulster, they tended to disperse to other parts of the province resulting in those tasked with settling the land having to retain native Irish who remained predominantly Catholic.

James VI & I's campaign to pacify the borders resulted in great numbers of Border reiver families arriving in Ulster. The Border reiver families were not known for their religiousness and the Reformation had made little impact on them. Once they had settled in Ulster they realised the advantages of becoming Protestants and conformed to the established church.

Between 1615 and 1620, a policy of "discovery and regrant" was used in various parts of Ireland; however, few settlers were attracted to these plantations, resulting basically in new landowners. This policy was used in the counties of Leitrim, Longford, northern Wexford, as well as parts of King's County and Queen's County.

By the 1630s, Protestant settlers from Great Britain were migrating to Ireland by their own initiative, and helped initiate a colonial spread from the ports where they arrived and into the hinterlands of Ulster.

It is estimated that in regards to Presbyterianism, that there were less than 10,000 adherents during the early seventeenth century.

==== Lord Wentworth ====
The Church of Ireland by the 1630s was a broad church that accepted various different Protestant practices and beliefs. As the Presbyterian church was not yet established in Ireland, Presbyterians were more than happy to join the Church of Ireland, which then exercised a good deal of tolerance and understanding. Across the island, the predominant doctrine within the Church of Ireland was puritanism, which like Presbyterianism, favoured simple and plain forms of worship and clothing. During the reign of Charles I, however, The 1st Viscount Wentworth (created 1st Earl of Strafford in 1640), Lord Deputy of Ireland, and Dr William Laud, Archbishop of Canterbury, sought to bring the Irish church into line with that in England by stamping out puritanism, and the anti-episcopal views of the Scottish ministers operating in Ulster. They also sought to replace the preferred form of worship amongst Protestants in Ireland with the more elaborate and orthodox Anglican style favoured by Charles I. To help achieve this, Lord Wentworth and Archbishop Laud introduced and enforced the English Thirty-Nine Articles along with stricter disciplinary canons in 1634. This was followed by puritan ministers who held Presbyterian sympathies being dismissed from the church, causing some of the leading ministers to make an abortive attempt to reach America hoping to find more liberty for their beliefs.

In 1635, Lord Wentworth proposed a plantation of Connacht, which would have seen all Catholic land confiscated and settled with only English Protestants, with the hope of converting the Gaelic and Old English Catholics to the state religion. This plantation would not see the light of day as Wentworth alienated Protestant and Catholic alike in Ireland, and Charles I got into ever more trouble with Parliament.

Between 1640 and 1641, Protestants and Catholics alike in the Irish Parliament united in opposition to Wentworth, and pushed for the Graces—first arranged in 1628—to be confirmed as well as filing lists of complaints about his behaviour and practices. This union of cause survived until the common denominator, Wentworth (by now Earl of Strafford), was executed by the English parliamentarians in May 1641.

==== Rebellion and birth of Irish Presbyterianism ====
By the 1630s, more than a quarter of land in Ireland was owned by Protestants, by the outbreak of the Irish Rebellion of 1641, they held roughly three-fifths. Whilst the uprising initially targeted the English settlers in Ulster, the native Irish soon turned upon the Scots.

The 1641 rebellion in Ulster was largely a response to the dispossession of Irish Catholics during the plantation, and resulted in the deaths of thousands of Protestant settlers. Modern historians have revised the figures to state that around 4,000 settlers were killed with another 8,000 dying from disease and exposure. It is claimed that between a third to half of these deaths were Presbyterians.

A direct consequence of the rebellion was the arrival in 1642 of a Scottish army to Ulster, this army was routed by a smaller force of native Irish at the battle of Benburb, fled back to Carrickfergus where it played no further role in the Cromwellian reconquest. The Presbyterian chaplains and office-elders in this army set up the first Presbytery in Ulster, on 10 June 1642 in Carrickfergus, County Antrim. This was the beginning the history of the Presbyterian church in Ireland.

==== Wars of the Three Kingdoms ====
The Wars of the Three Kingdoms, of which the Irish rebellion was part, came to engulf England, Ireland and Scotland in related conflicts. One of the best estimates given for the scale of death during this period gives an estimated 112,000 Protestants, along with around 504,000 Catholics, dying from plague, war or famine, from a pre-war population of around one-and-a-half million.

With the victory of the Parliamentarians, the Cromwellian Act for the Settlement of Ireland 1652 saw Catholics found guilty of disloyalty having their estates confiscated and granted to loyal Protestants. Whilst Protestants also guilty of disloyalty were to lose some of their estates, they ended up being given fines, the majority of which were never paid. The result of this land settlement saw a mass changing of land ownership as Catholic ownership almost disappeared completely east of the River Shannon. It also greatly increased the number of Protestants in Ireland, and saw them come to dominate both the countryside and urban centres and have near absolute control over politics and trade.

==== Restoration Ireland ====
By the 1660s, Catholics owned hardly more than one-fifth of land. Protestant immigration to Ireland had started in earnest in the aftermath of the restoration of the monarchy in Ireland in 1660, helped by acts such as that "to Encourage Protestant Strangers to Settle in Ireland", passed in 1662. French Protestants, known as Huguenots, escaping persecution in France formed their own small community in Dublin where they became famous for developing poplin and handsome stone buildings called "Dutch Billy's". Around the same time, Jews—regarded as "foreign Protestants"—settled in Dublin having originally sought refuge in Tenerife. The Plantation of Ulster also finally swung into full motion as a constant stream of English and Scottish families made their way to the north of Ireland.

The death of Charles I in 1649 saw puritanism reach its peak as the Church of Ireland became restricted allowing other Protestant denominations to freely expand. Puritans also went about establishing non-conforming Protestant churches such as Baptist, Quaker, Congregational, as well as Presbyterian. As puritanism refused to conform to the doctrines of the established church it became known as "nonconformity", with those not adhering to the Church of Ireland being classified as Dissenters.

==== Williamite era ====
The revocation of the Edict of Nantes in 1685 saw great numbers of Huguenots flee from France, with as many as 10,000 migrating to Ireland during the 1690s, including veterans from the Huguenot regiments in the army of William III. In total twenty-one Huguenot communities were established the most notable of which was established at Portarlington, Queen's County. Some Huguenot congregations conformed to the Church of Ireland, though others maintained their own instilling some hostility from the established church. Scottish Presbyterian immigration to Ulster also reached its peak during this period and that of Queen Anne (1702–1707).

=== 18th century ===
==== German Palatines ====
In 1709 German Palatines fled persecution to England from the Rhineland in the Holy Roman Empire. Eight hundred and twenty-one families consisting of 3,073 people were resettled in Ireland that year. Of 538 families initially taken on by as tenants, 352 are reported to have left their holdings, with many returning to England. By late 1711 only around 1,200 of the Palatines remained in Ireland. The number of families dwindled to 162 by 1720.

Areas where the Palatines settled included counties Cork, Dublin, Limerick, and Wexford. Despite the exodus of Palatines in the years after their initial arrival in Ireland, a second relocation carried out in 1712 saw the establishment of two successful settlements, one being around Rathkeale, County Limerick, the other around Gorey, County Wexford. Limerick Palatines, despite some conversions to Catholicism, largely remained religiously and culturally endogenous.

The Palatines responded well to the teachings of Methodism, with John Wesley visiting them several times. By the 1820s they became victims of sectarian grief at the hands of Catholic agrarian societies, which further encouraged Palatine emigration from Ireland, resulting in them ceasing to be a separate grouping. Despite this, their distinctive way of life survived long into the 19th century.

==== The Penal Laws and converts to Protestantism ====
From 1697 to 1728, various Penal Laws were enacted by the Irish Parliament primarily targeting Catholics of the aristocracy, landed and learned classes. Some of these laws, however, also targeted Protestant Dissenters. Under one of these laws, Dissenters could only be married in the Church of Ireland otherwise it was not legal, making their children illegitimate in the eyes of the law. Another law passed in 1704 sought to prevent anyone who did not have communion in the Church of Ireland from holding public office, however as Catholics had already been excluded from public office this primarily targeted Dissenters. This test would not be removed until the Protestant Dissenter Relief Act was passed in 1780. However, the legal position of Dissenters was still restricted in the Irish Parliament by landlords and bishops. Dissenter marriages would not be legally recognised until an act passed in 1842.

Despite being the target of various penal laws, Dissenters remained vocal advocates of those that targeted Catholics so kept their complaints to a courteous tone. Indeed, penal laws similar to those passed by the Irish Parliament, were imposed against Protestants in France and Silesia, but in these cases it was by a majority against a minority, which was not the situation in Ireland.

The Penal Laws did encourage 5,500 Catholics, almost exclusively from the aristocracy and landed gentry, to convert to Protestantism. In 1703, 14% of land in Ireland was owned by Catholics. However, following the conforming of the majority of these landowners by 1780, Catholics only owned 5% despite making up three-quarters of the population of Ireland. Some of these converts were high profile, such as The 5th Earl of Antrim, whose conversion meant that in the province of Ulster there were no Catholic estates of any note. Others were less so, however made the most of the opportunities that opened up for them, one example being William Conolly. William Conolly was a Gaelic Catholic from Ballyshannon, County Donegal; however, in the years following his conversion to Protestantism, he would become the Speaker of the Irish House of Commons as well as Ireland's richest man despite being the son of an innkeeper.

The Penal Laws ensured that for the next century, Ireland was to be dominated by an Anglican elite composed of members of the Church of Ireland. This elite would come to be known as the Protestant Ascendancy. Ironically, despite attempts by some, the Ascendancy had no real desire to convert the mass of the Catholic population to Protestantism, fearing that it would dilute their own exclusive and highly privileged position, and many of the penal laws were poorly enforced.

Despite the Penal Laws and the domination of an Anglican minority over an overwhelming Catholic majority, open religious violence seems to have been quite rare during most of the 18th century. Not until the Armagh disturbances in the 1780s did sectarian divisions come back to the fore.

==== Dissenter grievances and emigration ====
Many of the Presbyterians who left Scotland for Ireland did so to escape the regime in place there, and as such, held anti-government views and were not trusted. Whilst they were anti-Catholic and helped populate landlords' estates along with other Dissenters, they suffered from political, religious and economic restrictions. Having sided with the Establishment and fighting alongside members of the Church of Ireland during the Williamite War in Ireland, Presbyterians were hoping that their loyalty and efforts would help redress their grievances, and they did find favour with William III. The Irish Parliament and Established Church were opposed to giving them full civil rights, and during Queen Anne's reign, penal laws targeting Dissenters came into force. By the 1720s, there was some redressing of Dissenter issues with the Indemnity Act and Toleration Act, followed by the Synod of Ulster in 1722 sending King George I an address of the injustices they faced.

During the 17th century the Dissenter population was low. However, after the reign of King William III, they formed a substantial portion of the Protestant population in Ireland (especially in Ulster), and increasingly became more politically active. The main issues Dissenters were concerned with were those that affected them most due to the Penal Laws: religious discrimination; economic development; and the matter of land.

Dissenters often were tenants rather than landowners, and faced ever increasing rents as landowners sought to increase their income. Any improvements made to the land by a tenant increased its value giving landlords an excuse to raise the rent. Other landlords simply demanded and raised rents on a whim. Those who could not afford to pay were forcibly evicted without warning. Tenants also had to follow the landlords' preferred choice in elections, which then were not held by secret ballot. One way to alleviate problems was to gain the favour of the landlord.

Eventually groups of tenants, some of which became movements such as the Hearts of Steel, Hearts of Oak and the Whiteboys, started to commit acts of crime against their landlords to raise awareness of their grievances. This included attacking cattle, burning buildings, and threatening letters amongst other acts. The larger groups, whilst sharing some grievances, had different primary focuses. For the Hearts of Oak, it was the paying of cess as well as tithes and small dues to the Church of Ireland. For the Hearts of Steel it was evictions and rents. They also had different tactics, which affected how successful they were. The Hearts of Oak acted during the day and in a highly public manner, which allowed the authorities to clamp down on them easier. The Hearts of Steel, however, took to performing secretive actions in the middle of the night.

Historian Francis Joseph Biggar states that the only options available for disillusioned Dissenters were to move to the towns, become a beggar, or emigrate to America, with emigration the preferred choice. Few Presbyterians seemed to choose returning to their native Scotland. In contrast, the Catholics, who suffered worst of all from the Penal Laws, chose to remain in Ireland, staying as close as possible to the parish of their ancestors.

Prior to the outbreak of the American War of Independence in 1776, between 100,000 and 250,000 Presbyterians emigrated from Ulster for the colonies in North America. The scale of this migration was such that in 1773, within the space of a fortnight, around 3,500 Ulster emigrants landed at Philadelphia alone. One knock-on effect of this emigration was parts of Ulster becoming only Catholic because of the depopulation of Protestants.

==== Political reform ====
The outbreak of the American War of Independence in 1776 had an important impact on Ireland. Many had relatives living in the colonies and thus a deep interest, with some entertaining notions of what a break from Britain might do for Ireland. British troops based in Ireland were transported to America to participate in the conflict, which raised fears of a possible French invasion, leading to the foundation of the Volunteers consisting of Dissenters and Anglicans, with some Catholic support. Whilst the Volunteers were formed as a defensive force, they quickly became involved in politics.

=== 19th century ===
The Dublin area saw many churches like the exquisite "Pepper Canister" – properly known as Saint Stephen's – built in the Georgian style during the 19th century. When Ireland was incorporated in 1801 into the new United Kingdom of Great Britain and Ireland, the Church of Ireland was also united with the Church of England to form the United Church of England and Ireland. At the same time, one archbishop and three bishops from Ireland (selected by rotation) were given seats in the House of Lords at Westminster, joining the two archbishops and twenty-four bishops from the Church of England.

In 1833, the British Government proposed the Irish Church Measure to reduce the 22 archbishops and bishops who oversaw the Anglican minority in Ireland to a total of 12 by amalgamating sees and using the revenues saved for the use of parishes. This sparked the Oxford Movement, which was to have wide repercussions for the Anglican Communion.

As the official established church, the Church of Ireland was funded partially by tithes imposed on all Irish landowners and tenant farmers, irrespective of the fact that it counted only a minority of the populace among its adherents; these tithes were a source of much resentment which occasionally boiled over, as in the Tithe War of 1831/36. Eventually, the tithes were ended, replaced with a lower levy called the tithe rent charge.

The Irish Church Act 1869 (which took effect in 1871) finally ended the role of the Church of Ireland as state church. This terminated both state support and parliament's role in its governance, but also took into government ownership much church property. Compensation was provided to clergy, but many parishes faced great difficulty in local financing after the loss of rent-generating lands and buildings. The Church of Ireland made provision in 1870 for its own government, led by a General Synod, and with financial management by a Representative Church Body. With disestablishment, the last remnants of tithes were abolished and the Church's representation in the House of Lords also ceased.

=== 20th century and 21st century ===
==== 20th century decline ====
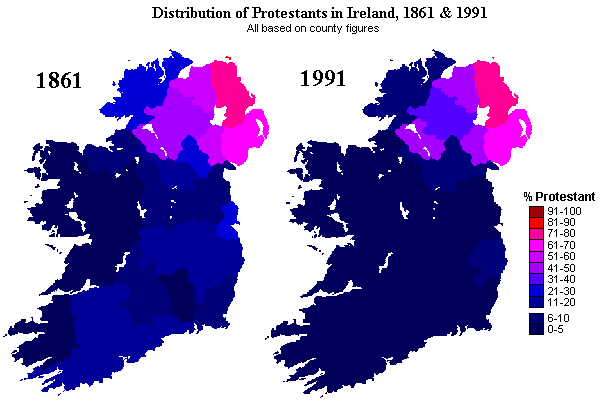
Concentration of Protestants in Ireland per county.

In 1991, the population of the Republic of Ireland was approximately 3% Protestant. The figure in the same geographical area was over 10% in 1891, indicating a fall of 70% in the relative Protestant population over the past century.

The Protestant depopulation in the Republic of Ireland during 1891-1991 was dramatic. Establishment of the Irish Free State in 1922 may have further accelerated this phenomenon as many Protestants were wary of living in a majority Catholic country and therefore chose to emigrate to the United Kingdom. In 1861 only the west coast and Kilkenny were less than 6% Protestant. Dublin and two of the 'border counties' were over 20% Protestant. In 1991, however, all but four counties were less than 6% Protestant; the rest were less than 1%. There were no counties in the Republic of Ireland which had experienced a rise in the relative Protestant population over the period 1861 to 1991. Often, the counties which managed to retain the highest proportion of Protestants were the ones which started off with a large proportion. In Northern Ireland, only counties Londonderry, Tyrone and Armagh have experienced a significant loss of the relative Protestant population; in these cases, the change was not as dramatic as in the Republic.

==== 21st century growth ====
The previous pattern of decline started to change during the 1990s. By the time of the 2006 census of the Republic of Ireland, a little over 5% of the state was Protestant. The 2011 census of the Republic of Ireland found that the Protestant population in every county had grown. In 2012, the Irish Independent reported that "Irish Anglicanism is undergoing a quite remarkable period of growth" due to immigration and Irish Catholics converting.

== Politics ==
=== Irish Parliament ===
Prior to the Plantation of Ulster in the opening decades of the 17th century, the Irish Parliament consisted of Catholic Old English and Gaelic Irish MPs. Whilst these MPs had few ideological objections to making Henry VIII head of the Irish church as well as to the establishment of Anglicanism in Ireland under Elizabeth I, resistance to government policies started to grow. To help tip the balance of power in Parliament in favour of Protestants, Sir Arthur Chichester, the Lord Deputy of Ireland, established sixteen new corporate towns in Ulster in the 1610s. These towns were little more than villages or planned towns. This resulted in Ulster alone returning 38 MPs to the Irish Parliament with the three other provinces altogether contributing 36, giving the government a majority of 32. This majority was reduced upon appeal by the Old English to six. However, under Lord Deputy Wentworth in 1640, a further sixteen Old English seats were removed. During 1640 and 1641, the interests of the Old English and New English combined to seek Wentworth's removal.

With the drastic decrease in Catholic landowners after the Cromwellian land settlement in the 1640s, by the time of the Restoration parliament in 1661, only one Catholic MP was returned to the Irish Parliament. However, his election was overturned.

The Protestant interest in Ireland would be no less compliant to English authority than the Old English had been. The convention of 1660, called after the restoration of the monarchy, saw 137 parliamentary members elected, all of whom were Protestant. It called upon King Charles II to summon a Parliament consisting of Protestant peers and commons, as well for the re-establishment of the Church of Ireland. Despite backing the restoration, as well as the system of episcopacy, it also asserted the Irish Parliament's legislative superiority over itself and its intent to set and collect its own taxes.

== Cultural and literature impact ==
The Church of Ireland undertook the first publication of the Bible in Irish. The first Irish translation of the New Testament was begun by Dr Nicholas Walsh, Bishop of Ossory, who worked on it until his death in 1585. The work was continued by John Kearny, his assistant, and Dr Nehemiah Donellan, Archbishop of Tuam; it was finally completed by William O'Domhnuill. Their work was printed in 1602. The work of translating the Old Testament was undertaken by Dr William Bedel (1571–1642), Bishop of Kilmore, who completed his translation within the reign of Charles I, although it was not published until 1680 in a revised version by Dr Narcissus Marsh (1638–1713), Archbishop of Dublin. Bedell had also undertaken a translation of the Book of Common Prayer in 1606. An Irish translation of the revised prayer book of 1662 was effected by John Richardson (1664–1747) and published in 1712.

== Denominations ==
- Church of Ireland
- Evangelical Presbyterian Church (Ireland)
- Methodist Church in Ireland
- Presbyterian Church in Ireland
- Reformed Presbyterian Church of Ireland
- Free Presbyterian Church
- Non-subscribing Presbyterian Church of Ireland
- Protestant Reformed Church
- Association of Baptist Churches in Ireland
- Independent Baptists
- Elim Pentecostal Church
- Assemblies of God
- Redeemed Christian Church of God
- Trinity Church Network
- Eternal Sacred Order of Cherubim and Seraphim
- Brethren
- Association of Vineyard Churches
- Congregational Union of Ireland
- Church of the Nazarene
- Lutheran Church in Ireland
- Non-denominational churches
- Calvary Chapel
- Quakers (Ireland Yearly Meeting)
- Seventh-day Adventist Church
- The Salvation Army

== See also ==
- Anglo-Irish
- Protestantism by country
- Protestantism in the Republic of Ireland
- Religion in Northern Ireland
- Ulster Protestants
- Ulster-Scots

== Bibliography ==
- Bardon, Jonathan (2001), The Plantation of Ulster, Gill & Macmillan, ISBN 978-0-7171-4738-0
- Bardon, Jonathan (2009), A History of Ireland in 250 Episodes, Gill & Macmillan, ISBN 978-0-7171-4649-9
- Blaney, Roger (2012), Presbyterians and the Irish Language, Ulster Historical Foundation, ISBN 978-1-908448-55-2
- Brown, Lindsay T. (1995), The Presbyterian Dilemma: A Survey of the Presbyterians and Politics in Counties Cavan and Monaghan over Three Hundred Years: Part II of a Series on the Monaghan Presbyterians, Clogher Record, Vol. 15, No 2.
- Carlton, Charles (1992), The Experience of the British Civil Wars, London: Routledge, ISBN 0-415-10391-6
- Connolly, S.J. (2007), Oxford Companion to Irish History, Oxford University Press, ISBN 978-0-19-923483-7
- Connolly, S.J. (1992), Religion, Law and Power: the making of Protestant Ireland 1660-1760, Oxford University Press, ISBN 0-19-820587-2
- Cooke, Dennis (1997), Persecuting Zeal. A Portrait of Ian Paisley, Brandon Book Publishers, ISBN 0-86322-242-0
- Donnelly, James S. (1981), Hearts of Oak, Hearts of Steel, Studia Hibernica, Editorial Board
- Delaney, Enda (2000), Demography, State and Society: Irish Migration to Britain, 1921-1971, Liverpool University Press, ISBN 0-85323-745-X
- Duffy, Seán (2004), Medieval Ireland An Encyclopedia, Routledge, ISBN 978-0415940528
- Duffy, Seán (2005), The Concise History of Ireland, Gill & Macmillan, ISBN 0-7171-3810-0
- James, Lawarance (2003) [2001], Warrior Race: A History of the British at War, New York: St. Martin's Press, p. 187, ISBN 0-312-30737-3
- Moody, T.W.; Martin, F.X.; Byrne, F.J. (1976), A New History of Ireland, Volume III: Early Modern Ireland 1534-1691, Oxford University Press, ISBN 978-0-19-956252-7
