= Ribbonism =

19th-century popular movement of poor Catholics in Ireland

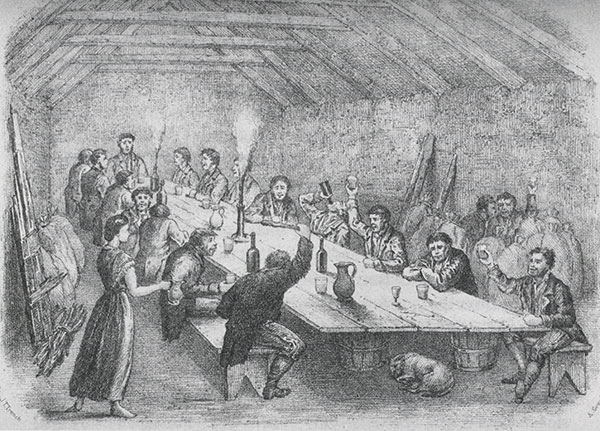
Ribbon society meeting in 1851

Ribbonism, whose supporters were usually called Ribbonmen, was a 19th-century popular movement of poor Catholics in Ireland. The movement was also known as Ribandism. The Ribbonmen were active against landlords and their agents, and opposed "Orangeism", the ideology of the Protestant Orange Order.

== History ==
The Ribbon Society was principally an agrarian secret society, whose members consisted of rural Irish Catholics. The society was formed in response to the miserable conditions in which the vast majority of tenant farmers and rural workers lived in the early 19th century in Ireland. Its objective was to prevent landlords from changing or evicting their tenants. Ribbonmen also attacked tithe and process servers, and later evolved the policy of Tenants' Rights. The existence of "ribandmen" was recorded as early as 1817. The name is derived from a green ribbon worn as a badge in a button-hole by the members.

Depending on the district, the society was variously known as the Fraternal Society, the Patriotic Association or the Sons of the Shamrock. The Ribbonmen's organisation was similar to that of the Whiteboys or the Defenders of earlier periods. They were organised in lodges, and during the 1820s were in contact with certain organisations of Radicals in England.

The ideology of the Ribbonmen supported the Catholic Association and the political separation of Ireland from Great Britain, and the rights of the tenant as against those of the landlord. The Ribbonmen were involved in violent (and sometimes deadly) riots with the Orange Order in the north of Ireland, and elsewhere used violence to resist paying tithes to the Protestant Church of Ireland. As the agitation for Catholic Emancipation grew, the tension between Ribbonism and Orangeism increased.

Historians disagree over the extent to which Ribbonism was an organised network of conspirators, as opposed to unrelated local groups whose similar actions were not coordinated. A.C. Murray suggests that any unsolved agrarian crimes after the Whiteboys and before the Land League were conveniently blamed on Ribbonism, with the 1871 report of the select committee into disturbances in County Westmeath being a case in point.

== See also ==
- Ancient Order of Hibernians
- Bathurst rebellion
- Captain Rock
- Croppy
- History of Ireland (1801–1922)
