= Whiteboys =

Secret 18th-century Irish agrarian organisation

The Whiteboys (Irish: na Buachaillí Bána) were a secret Irish agrarian organisation in 18th-century Ireland which defended tenant-farmer land-rights for subsistence farming. Their name derives from the white smocks that members wore in their nighttime raids. Because they levelled fences at night, they were usually called "Levellers" by the authorities, and by themselves "Queen Sive Oultagh's children" ("Sive" or "Sieve Oultagh" being anglicised from the Irish Sadhbh Amhaltach, or Ghostly Sally), "fairies", or followers of "Johanna Meskill" or "Sheila Meskill" (symbolic figures supposed to lead the movement). They sought to address rack-rents, tithe-collection, excessive priests' dues, evictions, and other oppressive acts. As a result, they targeted landlords and tithe collectors. Over time, Whiteboyism became a general term for rural violence connected to secret societies. Because of this generalization, the historical record of the Whiteboys as a specific organisation is unclear. Major outbreaks of Whiteboyism occurred in 1761–1764 and 1770–1776.

== Background ==
Between 1735 and 1760 there was an increase of land used for grazing and beef cattle, in part because pasture land was exempt from tithes. The landlords, having let their lands far above their value, on condition of allowing the tenants the use of certain commons, now enclosed the commons, but did not lessen the rent. As more landlords and farmers switched to raising cattle, labourers, and small tenant farmers were forced off the land. The Whiteboys developed as a secret oath-bound society among the peasantry. Whiteboy disturbances had occurred prior to 1761 but were largely restricted to isolated areas and local grievances, so the response of local authorities had been limited, either through passive sympathy or, more likely, because of the exposed nature of their position in the largely Roman Catholic countryside.

Their operations were chiefly in the counties of Waterford, Cork, Limerick, and Tipperary. This combination was not political: it was not directed against the government, but against local landlords. Members of different religious affiliations took part.

== First outbreak, 1761–1763 ==
The first major outbreak occurred in Tipperary in November 1761 and quickly spread to counties County Limerick, Cork, and Waterford. A great deal of organisation and planning seems to have been put into the outbreak, including the holding of regular assemblages. Initial activities were limited to specific grievances and the tactics used non-violent, such as the levelling of ditches that closed off common grazing land, although cattle hamstringing was often practised as the demand for beef had prompted large landowners to initiate the process of enclosure. As their numbers increased, the scope of Whiteboy activities began to widen, and proclamations were clandestinely posted under such names as "Captain Moonlight", stipulating demands such as that rent not be paid, that land with expired leases not be rented until it had lain fallow for three years, and that no one pay or collect tithes demanded by the Anglican Church. Threatening letters were also sent to debt collectors, landlords, and occupants of land gained from eviction, demanding that they give up their farms.

As well as the digging up of ley lands and orchards, they also searched houses for guns, and demanded money in order to purchase guns and defray the expenses of Whiteboys standing trial.

March 1762 saw a further escalation of Whiteboy activities, with marches in military array preceded by the music of bagpipes or the sounding of horns. At Cappoquin they fired guns and marched by the military barracks playing the Jacobite tune "The lad with the white cockade". These processions were often preceded by notices saying that Queen Sadhbh and her children would make a procession through part of her domain and demanding that the townspeople illuminate their houses and provide their horses, ready-saddled, for their use. More militant activities often followed such processions, with unlit houses in Lismore attacked, prisoners released in an attack on Tallow jail and similar shows of strength in Youghal.

=== Impact ===
While there had been limited agrarian disturbances in Ireland prior to 1760, the Whiteboys established many of the lasting traditions of peasant protest, including oaths of secrecy, uniforms, quasi-military organisation, and intimidation. Following the first Whiteboy outbreak, there was a marked increase in agrarian violence throughout Ireland which shared these common features.

== Reaction of the authorities ==
The events of March 1761, however, prompted a more determined response, and a considerable military force under the Marquess of Drogheda was sent to Munster to crush the Whiteboys.

On 2 April 1761, a force of 50 militiamen and 40 soldiers set out for Tallow, County Waterford, "where they took (mostly in their beds) eleven Levellers, against whom Information on Oath was given". Other raids took 17 Whiteboys west of Bruff, in County Limerick and by mid-April at least 150 suspected Whiteboys had been arrested. Clogheen in County Tipperary bore the initial brunt of this assault as the local parish priest, Fr. Nicholas Sheehy, had earlier spoken out against tithes and collected funds for the defence of parishioners charged with rioting. An unknown number of "insurgents" were reported killed in the "pacification exercise" and Fr. Sheehy was unsuccessfully indicted for sedition several times before eventually being found guilty of a charge of accessory to murder, and hanged in Clonmel in March 1766.

In the cities, suspected Whiteboy sympathizers were arrested and in Cork, citizens formed an association of about 2,000 strong which offered rewards of £300 for the capture of the chief Whiteboy and £50 for the first five sub-chiefs arrested and often accompanied the military on their rampages. The leading Catholics in Cork also offered similar rewards of £200 and £40 respectively.

However, Lord Halifax was soon expressing concern that the repression was going too far: "so many People are directly or indirectly concerned in these illegal Practices and so many have been seized on Information or Suspicion, that in several Places, the Majority of the Inhabitants have been struck with the utmost Consternation, and have fled to the Mountains, insomuch that at this Season, from the almost general Flight of the labouring Hands, a Famine is, not without Reason, apprehended." Similarly, the Dublin Journal reported at the same time that the south-east part of Tipperary "is almost waste, and the Houses of many locked up, or inhabited by Women and old Men only; such has been the Terror the Approach of the Light Dragoons has thrown them into."

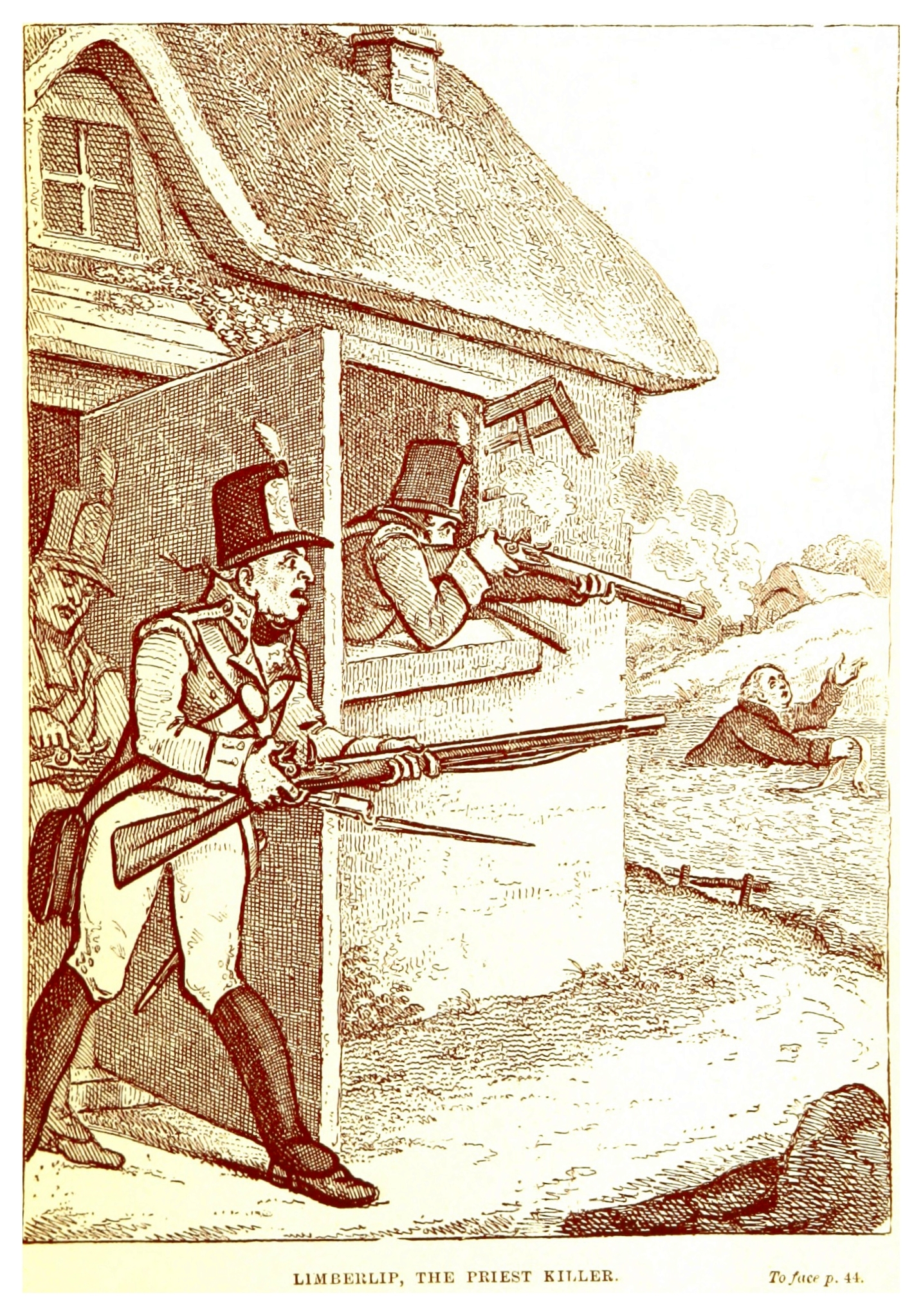
An illustration of Jedediah Limberlip firing on a fleeing Father Duane

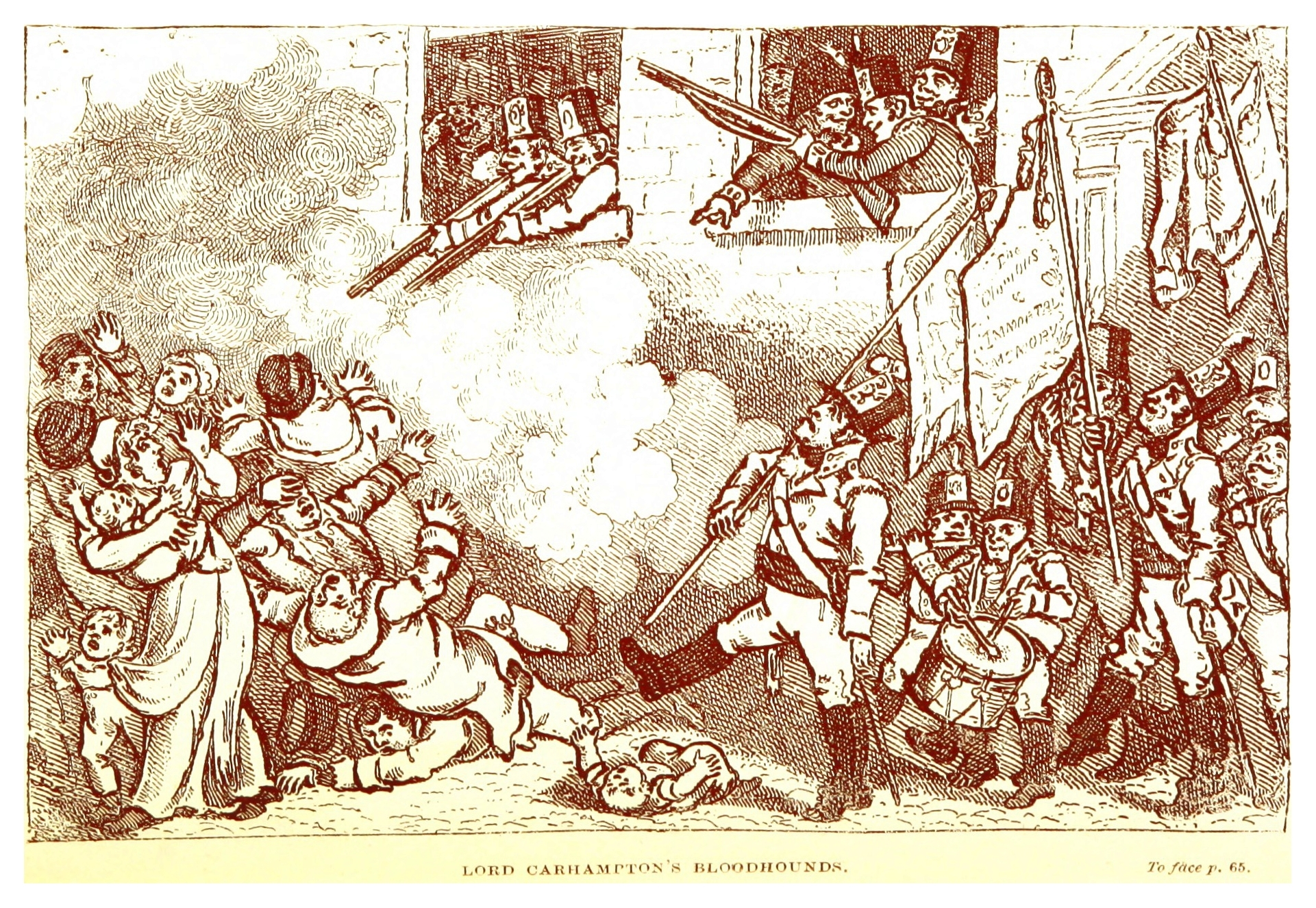
Lord Carhampton's Bloodhound Soldiers

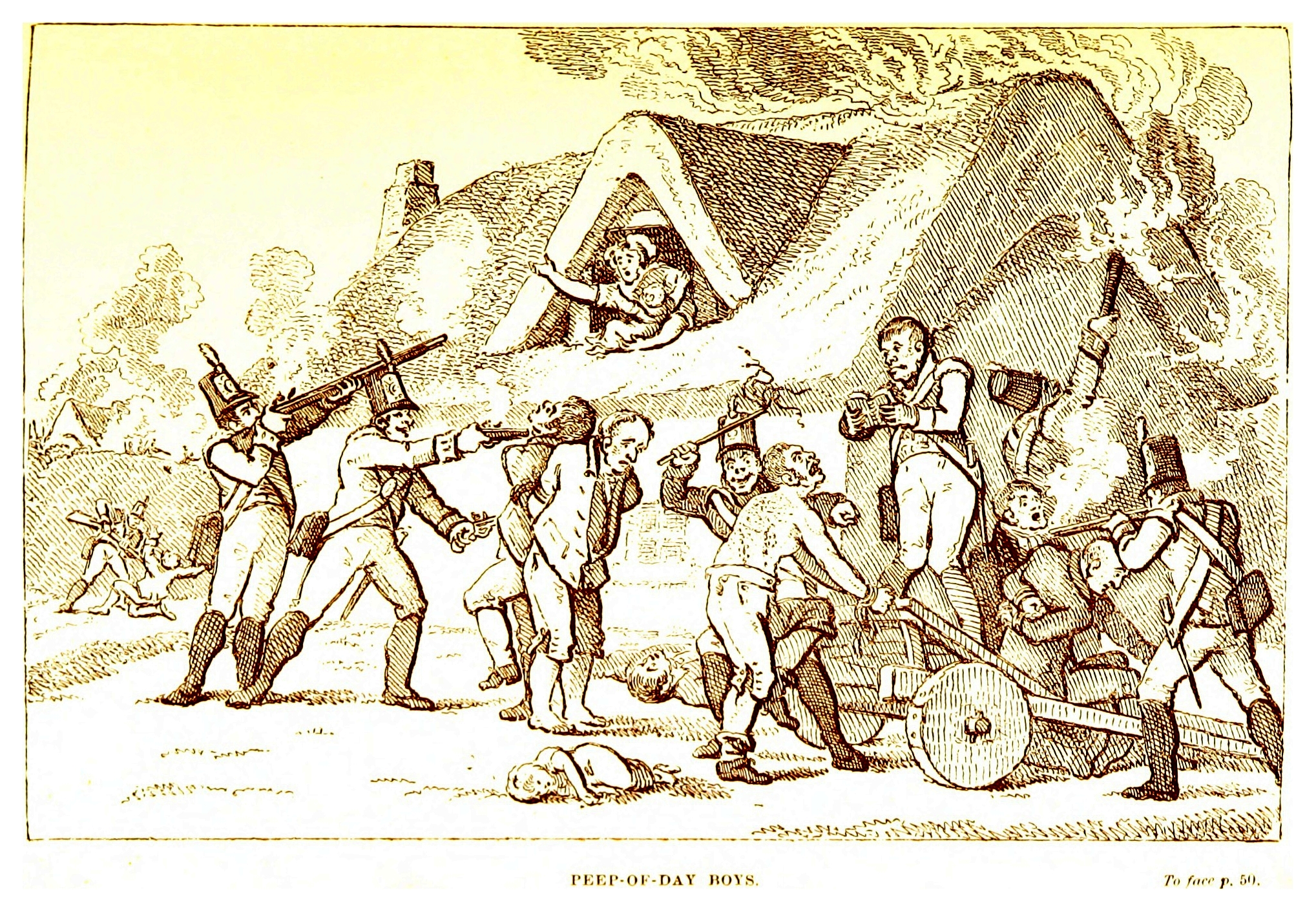
Peep-of-Day Boys

In the aftermath of the Irish Rebellion of 1798, agrarian agitation swept Munster.

In 1822 a group of about fifty attacked the house of a Mr. Bolster near Athlacca, where they damaged the house, broke the windows, and took his musket.

=== Whiteboy Acts ===
Acts passed by the Parliament of Ireland (to 1800) and Parliament of the United Kingdom of Great Britain and Ireland (from 1801) to empower the authorities to combat Whiteboyism were commonly called "Whiteboy Acts".

Whiteboy Acts
Short title (Note: Where there is no official short title, the common name is given in italics.)	Regnal year and chapter	Notes	Status in Rep. Ireland	Refs
Whiteboy Act 1765	5 & 6 Geo. 3. c. 8 (Ir.)		Repealed 1879	
Tumultuous Risings Act 1775	15 & 16 Geo. 3. c. 21 (Ir.)		Partly in force	
Tumultuous Risings (Extension) Act 1777	17 & 18 Geo. 3. c. 36 (Ir.)	Extends 1775 act.	Partly in force	
Riot Act 1787	27 Geo. 3. c. 15 (Ir.)		Repealed 1997	
Tumultuous Risings (Ireland) Act 1831	1 & 2 Will. 4. c. 44		Partly in force	

== In popular culture ==
In Thomas Flanagan's 1979 work The Year of the French, a group of Whiteboys in Killala are featured prominently throughout the novel, with many of them being major characters within the narrative. One of the novel's main protagonists is Malachi Duggan, a Whiteboy who attempts to reverse the domination of the Protestant Ascendancy through guerilla warfare in County Mayo. When a French expeditionary force commanded by Jean Joseph Amable Humbert lands in Ireland in 1798, Duggan joins him in the ultimately successful rebellion.

In the 2016 young adult novel, Assassin's Creed: Last Descendants – Tomb of the Khan by Matthew J. Kirby, the Whiteboys attack on Mr. Bolster's estate is featured. Brandon Bolster is named as an ancestor to the fictional 21st-century teenager Sean Molloy who is reliving his memories.

== See also ==
- Black Donnellys (Irish-Canadian family entangled in a feud with North American Whiteboys)
- Captain Rock
- Hearts of Oak (Ireland)
- Molly Maguires (Irish-American rural unrest)
- Peep O'Day Boys
- Ribbonism
- Rightboys
