= Captain Rock =

Mythical Irish folk hero

Captain Rock was a mythical Irish folk hero, and the name used for the agrarian rebel group he represented in the south-west of Ireland from 1821 to 1824.

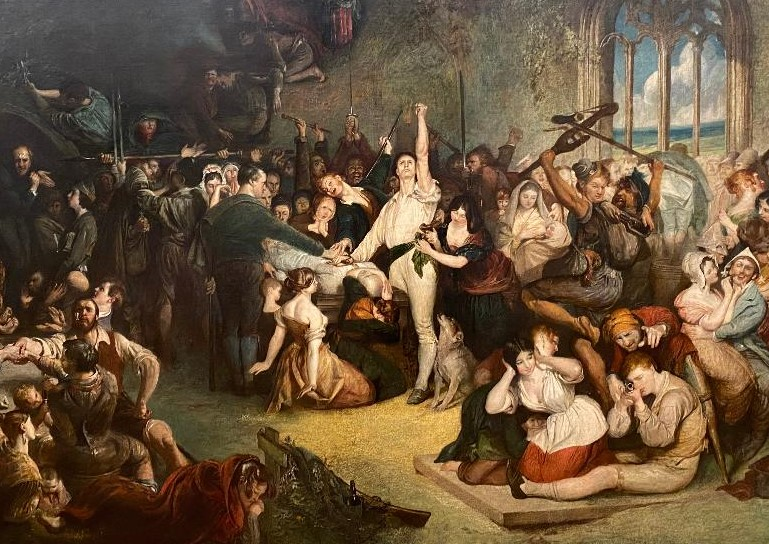
The Installation of Captain Rock by Daniel Maclise, 1834

Arising following the harvest failures in 1816 and 1821, the drought in 1818 and the fever epidemic of 1816-19. Rockites, similar to the earlier Whiteboys, targeted landlords who were members of the Protestant Ascendancy. Captain Rock (or Rockites) were responsible for up to a thousand incidents of beatings, murder, arson and mutilation in the short time they were active.

With the return of "a bearable level of subsistence", the low-level insurrection for a period subsided, but was to flare repeatedly through, and beyond, the Great Irish Famine of the 1840s. Over this period and in subsequent years, well into the nineteenth century, threatening letters signed by "Captain Rock" (as well as other symbolic nicknames, such as "Captain Steel" or "Major Ribbon") issued warnings of violent reprisals against landlords and their agents who tried to arbitrarily put up rents, collectors of tithes for the Anglican Church of Ireland, government magistrates who tried to evict tenants, and informers who fingered out Rockites to the authorities. Such letters would borrow the language of official or legal documents and failure to obey would be met with destruction of property or livestock or physical violence against the addressee.

== Millenarianism ==
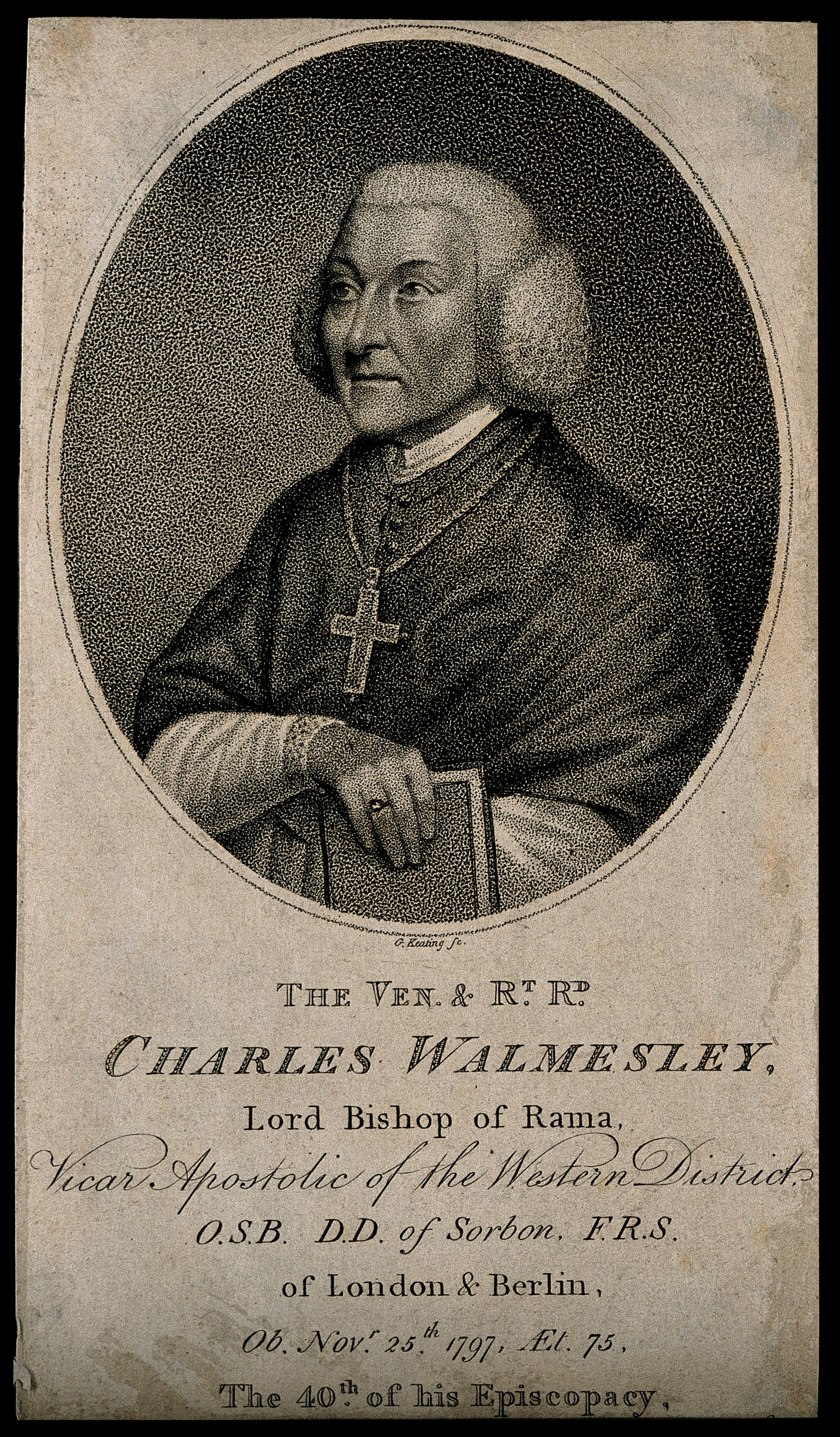
Portrait of Walmesley held in the Wellcome Collection

A key element of the Rockite movement of Munster and Leinster was the revolutionary excitement elicited by millenarian political prophecies stemming from Charles Walmesley, better known by his pseudonym, Pastorini. These prophecies interpreted the Book of Revelation as a foretelling of the destruction of Protestantism in 1825, creating an element of insurrectionary sectarianism among Rockites, unseen in most comparable movements.

== Relationship with O'Connell ==
Catholic Emancipation as a world upside down: held aloft, Daniel O'Connell promises wigs – symbol of Ascendancy rank and property – for "ye all." (Isaac Cruikshank 1789–1856)

Despite Daniel O'Connell's opposition to violent agitation, Rockites and other agrarian activists including Whiteboys formed part of O'Connell's broad support base. This is due to his reputation as a lawyer, being willing to act for agrarian activists, including Rockites, charged with serious offenses such as rape and murder. The growth of Catholic advocacy through Daniel O'Connell's implementation of the Catholic rent was also directly linked with millenarian prophecies, with the toppling of Protestant Ascendancy being conflated with the destruction of Irish Protestants.

== Representation ==
Captain Rock becoming a symbol for retaliation by "an underclass which had nothing left to lose" owes much to the publication in 1824 of Thomas Moore's The Memoirs of Captain Rock. Moore relates the history of Ireland as told by a contemporary, the scion of a Catholic family that lost land in successive English settlements. The character, Captain Rock, is fictional but the history is in earnest. When it catches up with the narrator in the late Penal Law era, his family has been reduced to the "class of wretched cottiers". Exposed to the voracious demands of spendthrift Anglo-Irish landlords (famously pilloried by Maria Edgeworth in Castle Rackrent), both father and son assume captaincies among the "White-boys, Oak-boys, and Hearts-of Steel", the tenant conspiracies that attack tax collectors, terrorise the landlords' agents and violently resist evictions.

In 1829, Charlotte Elizabeth Tonna, published a riposte to Moore's Memoirs, which she denounced as an incitement to rebellion inspired by the Vatican. The Rockite: An Irish Story links the recurrence of "Rockite banditti" to the failure of a dissolute Protestant gentry to win by example their tenantry to the true faith.

Other notable representations in popular culture include a hand-colored lithograph of "Captain Rock's Banditti swearing in a new Member", caricatures of "Lady Rock" depicting Rockites cross-dressing as women when committing acts of violence, and the painting "The Installation of Captain Rock" by the celebrated romantic artist Daniel Maclise (exhibited in London in 1834, now in the National Gallery in Dublin).

== See also ==
- Captain Swing, a contemporary English folk hero
