= Dobb =

Dobb may refer to:

- Dobb (surname)
- Dobb-e Hardan, a village in Khuzestan Province, Iran
- Dobb-e Moleyhem, a village in Khuzestan Province, Iran
- Dobb-e Said, a village in Khuzestan Province, Iran

== See also ==
- Daub
- Dob (disambiguation)
- Dobbs (disambiguation)
- Dobby (disambiguation)
- Dobbie, a surname
- Dobbins (disambiguation)
