= Dob =

DOB or Dob often refers to date of birth.

DOB or Dob may also refer to:

== Biochemistry ==
- 2,5-dimethoxy-4-bromoamphetamine, Bromo-DMA, a psychedelic drug
  - Meta-DOB, related substance
  - Methyl-DOB, related substance
- HLA-DOB, human gene

== Organizations ==
- Daughters of Bilitis, an international lesbian and feminist organization
- Dykes on Bikes, international network of lesbian motorcycle clubs
- New York City Department of Buildings

== People ==
- Mounir Dob (born 1974), Algerian football referee
- Daniel O'Brien (comedian), writer for Cracked.com

== Places ==
- Dob (toponym), a Slovene toponym, also found in Austria and Italy
- Dob, Domžale, Upper Carniola, Slovenia, a village
- Dob, a hamlet of Slovenska Vas, Šentrupert, Slovenia, with a pear tree avenue and a prison
- Dob, Bhopal, a village in India

== Other ==
- Date of Birth, a Japanese indietronica band
- Division of Banks, an Australian Electoral Division in New South Wales
- Dust of Basement, an electronic music band originally from Berlin
- Deutsche Oper Berlin, opera company in the Charlottenburg district of Berlin
- NATO Dispersed Operating Bases (DOBs)
- Dobo Airport, Indonesia (IATA code DOB)
- Dob, a cultivar of Karuka
- Dobsonian telescope, often referred to as a "Dob"

== See also ==
- Dob-dob, Tibetan monk
- Dob's Linn, geologically significant location in Scotland
- Dobber (disambiguation)
- Dobb (disambiguation)
- Dobbs (disambiguation)
- Dobby (disambiguation)
- Daub
