= Dobbe =

Dobbe is a surname of Dutch origin.

== People with the surname ==
- Sarah Dobbe (born 1979), Dutch politician
- Willy Dobbe (born 1944), Dutch television presenter

== See also ==
- Dobb
- Dobbs
- Dobby
- Dobbie
- Dobe
