= Dobbs =

Dobbs may refer to:

== Places ==
- Dobbs County, North Carolina, US
  - Fort Dobbs (North Carolina), US, an 18th-century fort
- Dobbs Weir, Hertfordshire, England

== Other uses ==
- Dobbs (surname), a list of people and fictional characters
- Dobbs v. Jackson Women's Health Organization, a 2022 landmark US Supreme Court decision on abortion rights

== See also ==
- Dobb (disambiguation)
- Dob (disambiguation)
