= Dobšice (Znojmo District) =

- Municipality
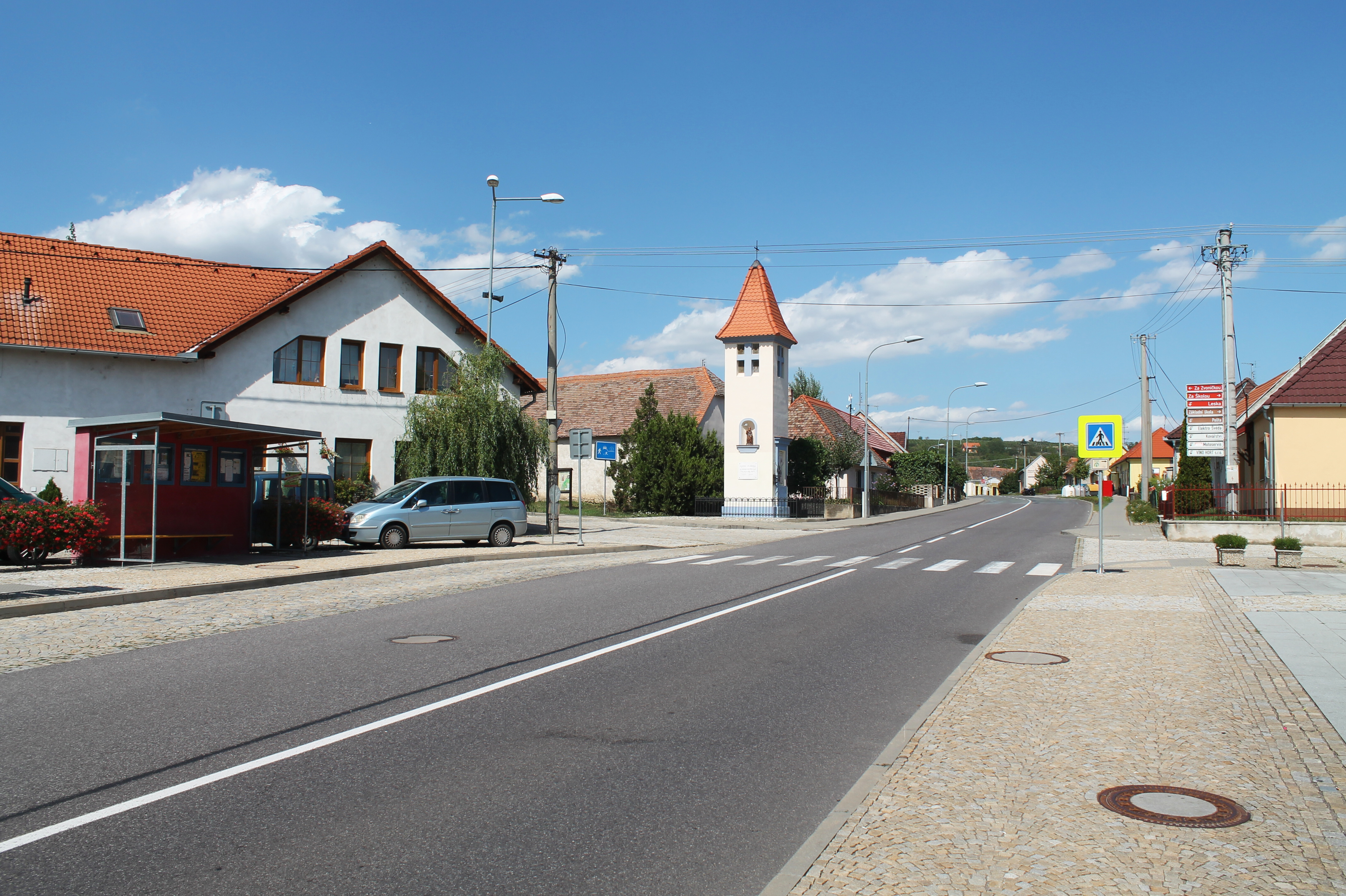
- Centre of Dobšice

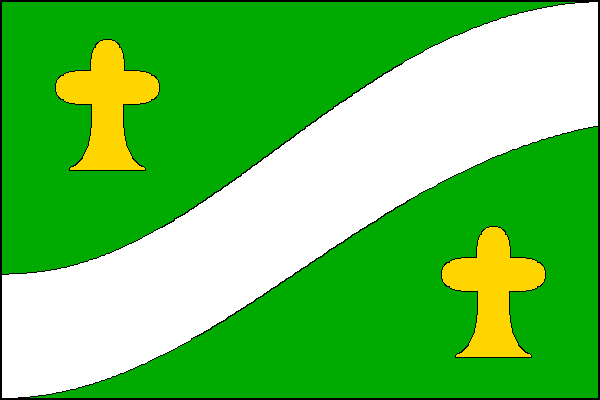
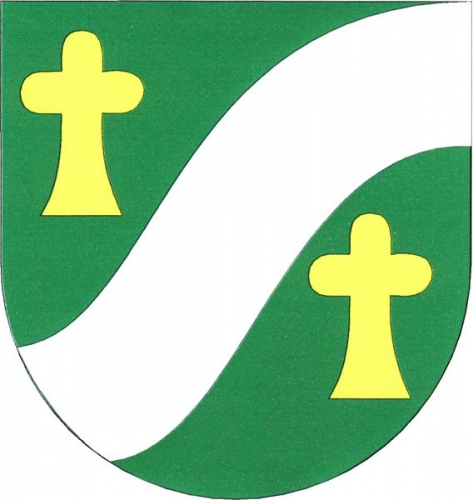
- Flag Coat of arms

- Location in the Czech Republic
- Coordinates: 48°50′54″N 16°5′7″E
- Country: Czech Republic
- Region: South Moravian
- District: Znojmo
- First mentioned: 1190

Area
  - Total: 4.74 km^{2} (1.83 sq mi)
- Elevation: 214 m (702 ft)

Population (2026-01-01)
  - Total: 2,225
  - Density: 469/km^{2} (1,220/sq mi)
- Time zone: UTC+1 (CET)
  - Summer (DST): UTC+2 (CEST)
- Postal code: 671 82
- Website: www.dobsice.cz

Dobšice (German: Klein Teßwitz) is a municipality and village in Znojmo District in the South Moravian Region of the Czech Republic. It has about 2,200 inhabitants.

== Etymology ==
The name is derived from the personal name Dobeš. During history, the village was also called Stošíkovičky and Tesswitz, but in 1918 it returned to its original name Dobšice.

== Geography ==
Dobšice is located about 53 kilometres (33 mi) southwest of Brno and in the immediate vicinity of Znojmo. It lies mostly in the Jevišovice Uplands, but the municipal territory also extends into the Dyje–Svratka Valley in the east. The highest point is at 300 m (984 ft) above sea level. The municipality is situated on the left bank of the Thaya River.

== History ==
The first written mention of Dobšice is in the foundation deed of the Louka Monastery from 1190. It was originally an ethnically Czech village, but it was gradually colonised by Germans. After World War II, the German-speaking population was expelled.

== Demographics ==
Historical population

Year	Pop.	±%
1869	788	—
1880	729	−7.5%
1890	996	+36.6%
1900	1,088	+9.2%
1910	931	−14.4%

Year	Pop.	±%
1921	927	−0.4%
1930	1,079	+16.4%
1950	849	−21.3%
1961	889	+4.7%
1970	781	−12.1%

Year	Pop.	±%
1980	1,636	+109.5%
1991	2,096	+28.1%
2001	2,342	+11.7%
2011	2,282	−2.6%
2021	2,263	−0.8%

Source: Censuses

== Economy ==
Dobšice is known for viticulture. It lies in the Znojemská wine subregion. There are about 28 ha (69 acres) of vineyards.

== Transport ==
The I/53 road from Znojmo to Pohořelice runs through Dobšice.

The railway line Znojmo–Břeclav passes through the municipal territory, but there is no train station. The municipality is served by the station in neighbouring Znojmo.

== Sights ==
There are no protected cultural monuments in the municipality.
