= Dobbs (surname) =

Dobbs is an English surname. Notable people with the surname include:

- Alfred Dobbs (1882–1945), British politician and trade unionist
- Amanda Dobbs (born 1993), American figure skater
- Arthur Dobbs (1689–1765), Anglo-Irish politician, colonial governor of North Carolina 1754–1765
- Arthur Frederick Dobbs (1876–1955), Irish politician
- Betty Jo Teeter Dobbs (1930–1994), American historian specializing in Isaac Newton's occult studies
- Bobby Dobbs (1922–1986), American footballer
- Catherine Dobbs (1908–1974), first woman mayor of a major U.S. industrial city, Barberton, Ohio
- Demarcus Dobbs (born 1987), American footballer
- Farrell Dobbs (1907–1983), American Trotskyist and trade unionist
- Francis Dobbs (1750–1811), Irish barrister, politician and writer
- Frank Q. Dobbs (1939–2006), American screenwriter, film director, film producer and cinematographer
- Gerald Dobbs (born 1971), retired English footballer
- Glenn Dobbs (1920–2002), American footballer
- Greg Dobbs (born 1978), American Baseball Player
- Greg Dobbs (journalist), American TV journalist
- Harold Dobbs (1918–1994), civic leader and politician in San Francisco, California
- Harriet Dobbs (1808–1887), Irish-Canadian charity worker
- Sir Henry Dobbs (1871–1934), administrator in British India and High Commissioner in Iraq
- Horace Dobbs (1933–2020), British scientist, researcher, author, and television producer
- Hoyt McWhorter Dobbs (1878–1954), American Methodist Bishop
- John Dobbs (1875–1934), American baseball player
- John Wesley Dobbs (1882–1961), African American civic and political leader
- Joshua Dobbs (born 1995), American football player
- June Dobbs Butts (1928–2019), American educator and writer
- Kildare Dobbs (1923–2013), Canadian short story and travel writer
- Lem Dobbs (born 1959), British-American screenwriter
- Linda Dobbs (born 1951), the first non-white judge in England and Wales
- Lou Dobbs (1945–2024), American journalist, radio and TV host
- Mattiwilda Dobbs (1925–2015), African-American coloratura soprano
- Michael Dobbs (born 1948), British politician and author
- Michael Dobbs (journalist) (born 1950), Anglo-American non-fiction author and journalist
- Nigel Dobbs (born 1962), English former cricketer
- Paul Dobbs (1970–2010), New Zealand motorcycle road racer
- Quail Dobbs (1941–2014), American rodeo clown and performer
- Ricky Dobbs (born 1988), United States Navy officer and former college football quarterback
- Roland Dobbs (1924–2016), British physicist
- Samuel Candler Dobbs (1868–1950), president and chairman of The Coca-Cola Company 1919–1922
- Thomas Dobbs, of the court case Dobbs v. Jackson's Women's Health

== Fictional characters ==
- Calvin Dobbs, on the TV series 227
- Fred C. Dobbs, protagonist of the film The Treasure of the Sierra Madre, played by Humphrey Bogart
- Fred C. Dobbs, played by satirist Michael Magee
- Hannibal Dobbs, on the TV series F Troop
- J. R. "Bob" Dobbs, figurehead of the Church of the SubGenius
- Jackie Dobbs, on the British soap opera Coronation Street
- Maisie Dobbs, in novels by Jacqueline Winspear
- Molly Dobbs, on the British soap opera Coronation Street
- Phyllis Dobbs, in BBC One's science fiction/police procedural drama Life on Mars
- Tyrone Dobbs, on the British soap opera Coronation Street
- Dobbs, a pilot in the novel Catch-22
