= Dobe =

Dobe may refer to:

- Dobê, a village in the Tibet Autonomous Region of China
- Dobe, Slovenia, a settlement in the Municipality of Kostanjevica na Krki in Slovenia
- Alternate name of adobe

== See also ==
- Dobeš, a surname
- Dobbe
- Doby
