= Dobie =

Dobie may refer to:

== Places ==
- Dobie, Barron County, Wisconsin, an unincorporated community
- Dobie, Douglas County, Wisconsin, an unincorporated community
- Dobie, a place in the township of Gauthier, Ontario, Canada

== People and fictional characters ==
- Dobie (name), a list of people and fictional characters with the surname or given name
- Dobie (musician), stage name of British alternative hip hop musician and producer Anthony Alexander Campbell

== Other uses ==
- Doberman Pinscher or Dobie, a breed of dog
- Dobie High School, Houston, Texas
- Dobie Center, a privately owned residence hall adjacent to the University of Texas at the Austin campus

== See also ==
- Dobby (disambiguation)
