= Irish Volunteers (18th century) =

18th-century local Irish militias

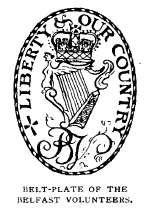
- The Volunteers primary motif: the Irish harp mounted by the British crown.
- Founded: 1776
- Dissolved: 1793
- Country: Kingdom of Ireland
- Status: Independent, locally-organised, volunteer militia companies associated in battalions and regiments
- Size: 88,000 (highpoint in 1782)

The Irish Volunteers were a patriot militia movement formed in the Kingdom of Ireland during the American War of Independence. Massing under arms in the capital, and inspired by American example, in 1782 the Volunteers persuaded the British Crown to renounce its previously asserted right to overrule the Parliament in Dublin and to legislate for Ireland from Westminster. The movement subsequently split over the question of whether reform of Ireland's Parliament and Vice-regal administration should encompass emancipation of the Kingdom's Roman Catholic majority, Protestants alone having a right to vote, to assume office and to carry arms.

Following the onset of war in 1793 with the new French Republic, the government moved to suppress extra-parliamentary opposition and to induct Volunteers into a Crown militia. Concentrated among the Protestant "Dissenters" (Presbyterians) in Ulster, the more uncompromising elements entered into a republican conspiracy, breaking into open rebellion in 1798. In the wake of the rebellion, the Volunteer achievement, the "Constitution of 1782", was overturned by the abolition of the Irish Parliament under the Acts of Union 1800. In Ireland, in the twentieth century, paramilitaries, both unionist and nationalist, claimed the Volunteers as precedent.

== Origin and character ==
In 1776, as regular troops were withdrawn for service across the Atlantic, Volunteer companies formed around the depleted garrisons in the south: the Limerick Union, the Youghal Cavalry and, in Cork (city), the Cork Union, the Cork Boyne, and the Blackpool Horse. Following her recognition of the United States, the declaration of war against France in February 1778 triggered the movement in the north. Memories of the French in 1760, during the Seven Years War, seizing the castle at Carrickfergus, prompted Belfast to form what was to be the town's First Volunteer Company in March. When in April, the American privateer John Paul Jones captured a Royal Navy sloop sent to block his entry to Belfast Lough recruitment surged, with the new formations following in Lisburn and Derry. Further driven, with Spain's entry into the war, by fears of a Franco-Spanish armada, during the summer of 1779 Volunteer numbers rose to some 30,000 organised across the country in hundreds of independent companies.

By the summer of 1780, these part-time units, typically in the range of 60 to 100 men, were associating in larger battalions and in Ulster, the strongest Volunteer province, in regiments. They were also parading in reviews before their "Commander-in-Chief". Choice for this, as it transpired largely titular, position fell to the colonel of the First Ulster [Armagh] Volunteer Regiment, James Caulfeild, Earl of Charlemont. Charlemont was a confidante of the leaders of the Patriot opposition in Irish House of Commons, Henry Grattan and Henry Flood.

There was alarm in Dublin Castle. As early as May 1779, the Lord Lieutenant, Lord Buckinghamshire, had canvassed the possibility of disarming the Volunteers and preventing their assembly. Such was the shortage of reliable troops at his command, that he was persuaded, not only that this was impracticable, but that he had no choice but to accede to pressure, and release arms to the very men whom he would have dispersed by military force. These were to remain independent of his vice-regal administration and of the Parliament. Volunteer officers accepted their commission, not from the Crown, but (with social deference and patronage playing their part) through election from the ranks.

As far back as 1715 and 1745, self-constituted local defensive forces had mustered in anticipation of Stuart invasions. In the 1760s, these reassembled to help break Whiteboy resistance to rack-renting, tithe-collection, and enclosure. Such companies or posses often comprised little more than landowners enlisting, however few, Protestants they could count upon among their tenants. Where, in the south, there had been a resurgence of Whiteboy activity, this remained the character of the new the Volunteer corps, which consequently tended to "reinforce, rather than destabilise, the local hierarchy".

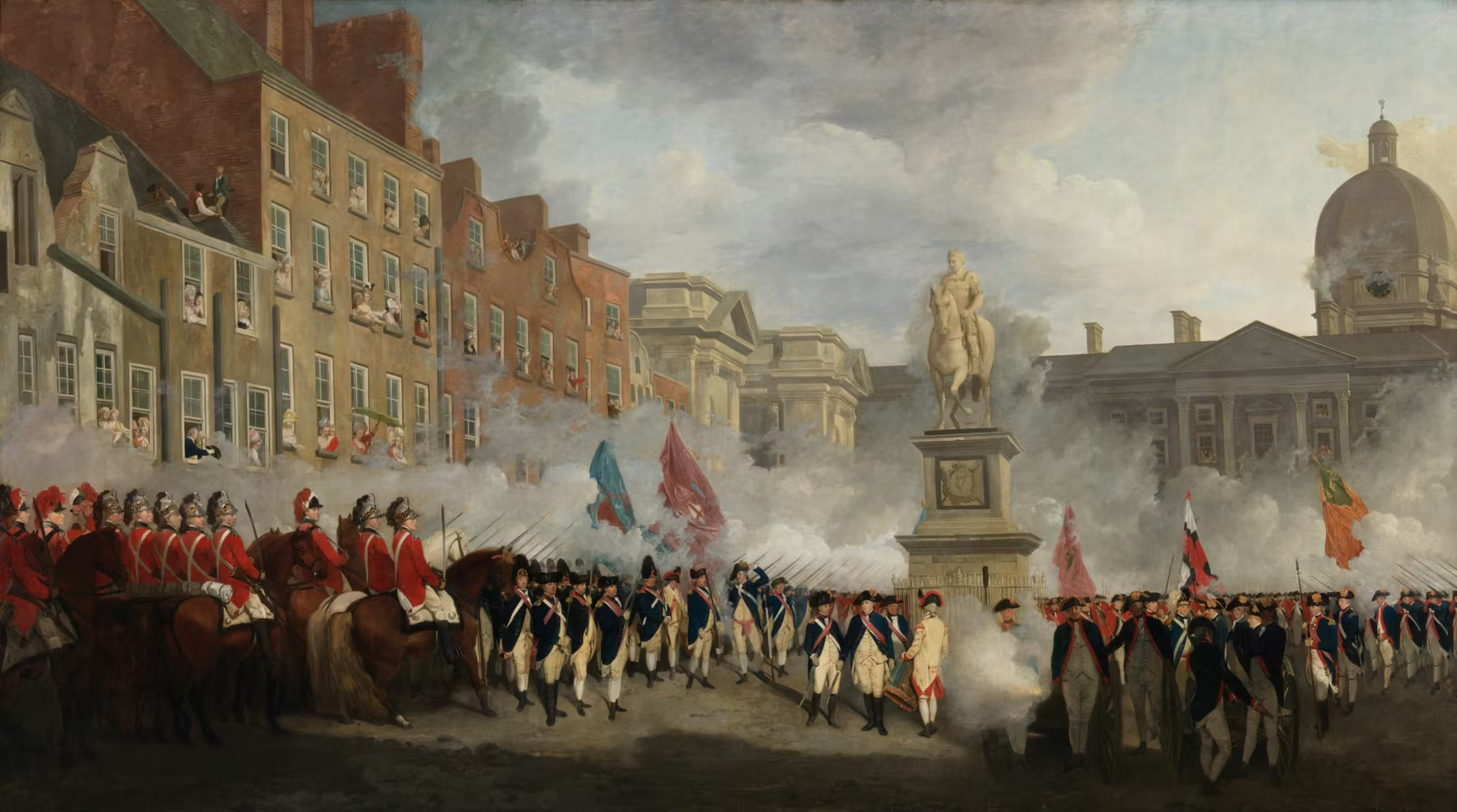
Dublin Volunteers parading on College Green on 4 November 1779

In the areas of greater Protestant concentration, in Cork, in Waterford, in Dublin city and County, and in the Presbyterian north-east Volunteers might assist in the same policing functions. There is record of the Belfast companies, at the request of the county sheriffs, marching with their six pounders into Antrim and Down (which had their own traditions of agrarian resistance) to enforce evictions. But their ranks were filled with the broader "Protestant tenantry of Ireland". This was a middle class of freehold farmers, merchants, manufacturers, and attendant professionals, whose properties, even where extensive, were commonly held on lease an aristocracy that had been formed, and reformed, in the Irish land settlements of the preceding century.

In these city and market-town companies, the "drilling and training, purchasing of uniforms and arms, drawing up articles of association, electing their officers, [and] instructing delegates" for Volunteer conventions, "contributed to greater political awareness". For Presbyterians, this included a consciousness of sharing, if only in part, the disabilities imposed upon the Roman Catholic majority by the landowning Anglican establishment. In Belfast, this "Protestant Ascendency" was represented by the Marquess of Donegall. Like the proprietors of numerous other parliamentary boroughs in the Kingdom, Donegall exercised an exclusive right to appoint the town's burgesses—public offices from which, as "Dissenters" from the established church, Presbyterians were excluded—and through the burgesses, to the "elect" those who would sit for the borough in the Irish House of Commons.Few Presbyterians ever reached in Commons, and none sat among the Lords in the upper house.

Opportunity to challenge the Ascendancy interest was confined to a small number of county and municipal contests were enfranchised freeholders might, in defiance of their landlords, be induced to vote for the promise of reform. Voting instead with their feet, Presbyterians had in large numbers been emigrating to the American colonies. Assessing their loyalty on the eve of their kinsmen's final break with the Crown, the Buckinghamshire's predecessor as vice-roy, Lord Harcourt, described the Presbyterians of Ulster as "Americans in their hearts".

In January 1780, victory over a Spanish squadron at Cape St. Vincent, restored faith in the ability of the Royal navy to defend its home waters and the fear of invasion abated. But with all ranks recognising "parallels between the issues animating the American struggle and their own grievances", Volunteering had acquired a momentum of its own. Like their often parallel masonic lodges, Volunteer companies were becoming "a battleground for political ideas".

== "Free Trade" ==
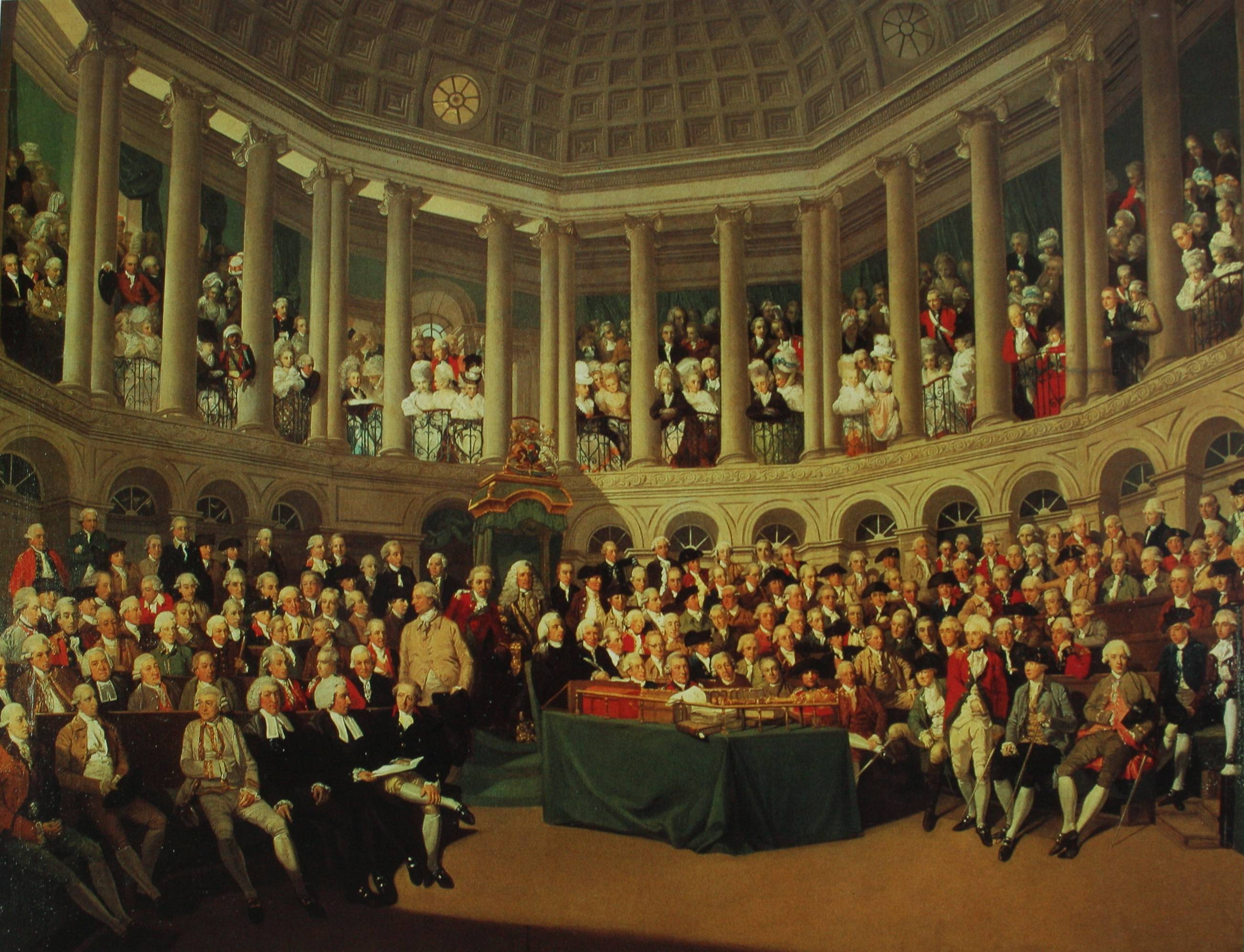
Grattan making a speech in the Irish House of Commons on 8 June 1780

Had Parliament been able to finance a militia bill enacted in March 1778, the Volunteer movement might have been stillborn. The difficulty was a sharp drop in excise, and other tax, revenues resulting from the war's disruption, first of Atlantic trade and then, with the entry of France and Spain, of trade with the European continent. The problem was further compounded by a British decision to embargo the export of Irish provisions so as to secure supplies for its armed forces.

The fiscal crisis and economic distress highlighted not only the incapacity of the Irish Parliament, but also what was almost universally regarded in Ireland as the injustice of British applied legislation. Legislating for Ireland, the British Parliament had banned the Irish export of wool, glass and other goods competitive with British producers and, through its Navigation Acts (of which Belfast's leading Volunteer, Waddell Cunningham, was serial violator) had sought to direct Irish foreign and colonial trade through British ports. In response, the Volunteers moved down a path travelled by the Patriots in America: mounting public campaigns to highlight the material costs of submitting to the "Imperial Crown" at Westminster, before advancing a radical constitutional remedy.

As had American colonists before 1776, Volunteers arranged local "non-importation agreements". The signatories undertook to buy Irish and boycott British goods, with the Volunteers themselves making much of having their uniforms tailored in home-spun cloth. The government of Prime Minister Lord North prepared a package of commercial concessions, but watered down by British mercantile interests these paled in comparison to the conditions extended to the Americans by the Carlisle Peace Commission. Britain, it seemed was "prepared to recompense American rebelliousness better than Irish loyalty".

In November 1779, on the annual commemoration of King William III's birthday, Volunteers marched to his statue in front of Parliament on College Green. Presenting themselves as "50,000 joined together, ready to die for their fatherland," they saluted "Free Trade" with volleys of shot and with cannon decked with banners threatening "Free Trade or this", "Free trade or a Speedy Revolution". Ireland was to be free, within the terms of her own tariff policies, to develop her manufactures and to have access to foreign and colonial trade unrestricted by rival British interests.

In London, the North ministry, still at that point contending with the prospect of a joint French and Spanish Channel crossing, capitulated. The Crown lifted the bans on Irish exports, and granted the right to trade directly with the plantation colonies. As an additional conciliatory gesture to the northern merchant class, the government relieved Presbyterians of the tests of Anglican conformity that, since the Popery Act of 1704, had excluded both they and Catholics from municipal corporations and other public service.

== The "Revolution of 1782" ==
=== First Dungannon Convention ===
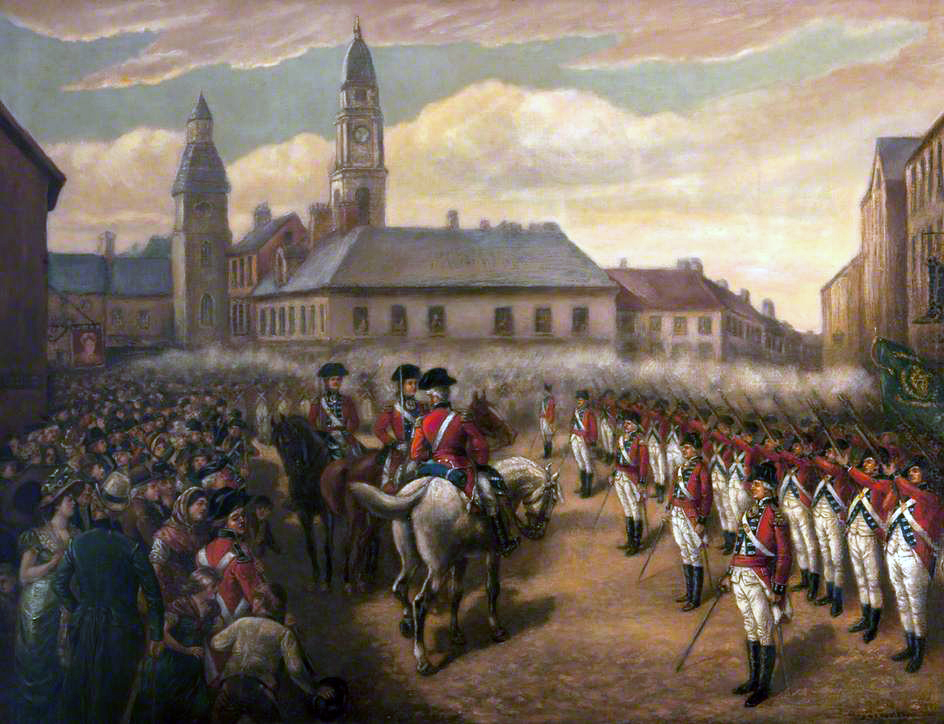
The Lisburn and Lambeg Volunteers firing a feu de joie in honour of the Dungannon Convention in 1782

Neither the Patriots in Parliament nor the Volunteers were satisfied. As the British opposition, under Charles James Fox, reminded them, so long as Great Britain maintained her right to legislate for Ireland as a subordinate kingdom, her mercantilist restrictions on Irish industry and commerce lifted in wartime, could be as readily re-imposed in time of peace. Against the background of the American crisis and economic recession, the concessions wrung from the Crown in London had also "whetted appetites" for further assertions of Irish interests and of Irish rights.

In February 1782, delegates from 360 Volunteer companies in Ulster gathered in Dungannon (central to the province, seat of the ancient Ó Néills and a meeting place for Presbyterian Synods). Taking on "the substance of a national assembly", the convention delegates resolved that "the claim of any body of men, other than the King, Lords, and Commons of Ireland, to make laws to bind this kingdom, is unconstitutional, illegal and a grievance".

=== Vindication of "Irish Rights" ===
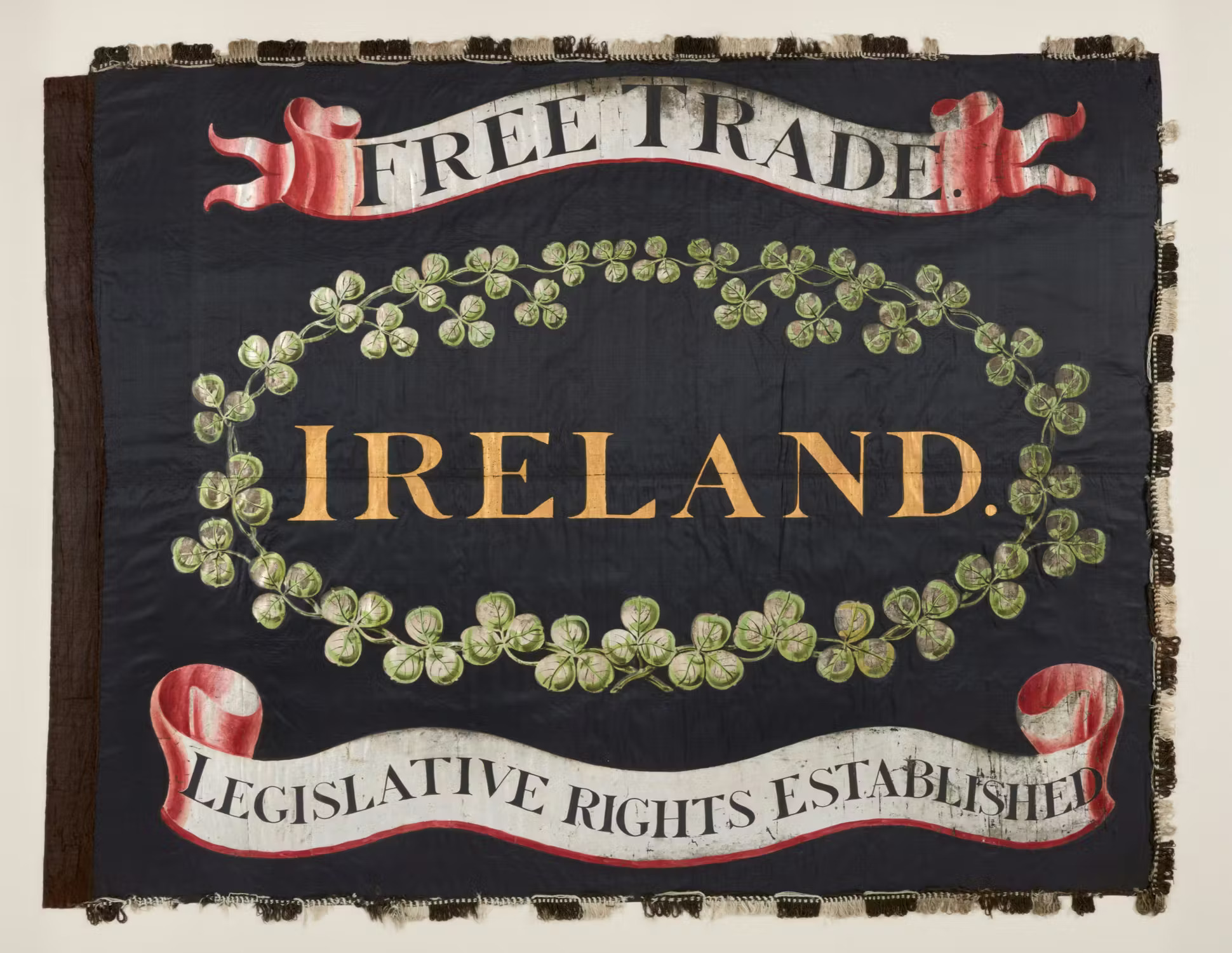
1782 Volunteers flag celebrating free trade and legislative independence

Two months later, with Volunteer cavalry, infantry, and artillery posted on all approaches to the Parliament in Dublin, Henry Grattan had a Declaration of Irish Rights carried by acclaim in the Irish House of Commons. While her crown was "inseparably annexed to the crown of Great Britain", Ireland was to be acknowledged as "a distinct kingdom, with a parliament of her own—the sole legislature thereof".

In London, the Rockingham Ministry, shaken by Cornwallis's surrender at Yorktown and new losses to the French and Spanish at sea, continued a policy of appeasement. In June 1782, the Westminster Parliament repudiated its previous declaration of Irish Dependency (1719). In April 1783, pressed by a renewed agitation initiated from Belfast, and responding to the demands of Grattan's Patriot rival, Henry Flood, Westminster offered a further measure to remove and prevent "all doubts which have arisen, or might arise, concerning the exclusive rights of the parliament and courts of Ireland". Commonly known as the Renunciation Act, the Irish Appeals Act 1783 declared that no appeal from the decision of any court in Ireland could be heard in any court in Great Britain. and affirmed "the rights claimed by [the people of Ireland] to be bound only by laws enacted by his Majesty and the parliament of that kingdom".

== Defeat of reform, 1783 ==
=== Provincial conventions and the "Catholic question" ===
Legislative independence had been won for a Parliament in which volunteering Protestants recognised they were represented more narrowly than their counterparts at Westminster. In Ireland, the "whole panoply of 'rotten boroughs'" and "bizarre franchises"was such that fully two thirds of the Commons were in the "pockets" either of the great landowning families (already ensconced in the Lords) or of Dublin Castle. Grattan, himself represented a borough in the gift of Charlemont. At the same time, while they might present themselves as more representative of the "nation" than the Lords and Commons, the Volunteers could make no claim to represent the majority of the King's subjects. Roman Catholics were "five sixths of the population", and with seemingly with little at stake in the Patriot cause.

In September 1783, a second Ulster convention was called in Dungannon, with delegates from 270 companies attending. Under the presidency of a prominent Country Down landowner and Member of Parliament, Robert Stewart, who was hostile to the proposition, the Convention debated but ultimately rejected, motions favoring Catholic emancipation. While they might "rejoice in the relaxation of the Penal Laws" against their "fellow subjects" (the Catholic Relief Acts of 1777 and 1782), Volunteers continued to hold that Catholics could not be trusted with complete liberty.

Professions of loyalty by Catholics in the wake of the permission granted to own land on the same conditions as Protestants, or to open their own schools on license from a Protestant bishop, made no impression on the Volunteers' provincial conventions in the south. No resolutions on the "Catholic question" were voted for Leinster, Munster or Connacht. All, however, were agreed with Ulster on the need for parliamentary reform.

=== National Convention in Dublin and parliamentary reform ===
At the "Grand National Convention", called for Dublin in November, Stewart was appointed chairman of the committee "for the receiving and digesting plans of reform". His advice to his friends in Parliament, and in Dublin Castle, was that the demands of Dissenters for greater representation should be met so as to dissuade them from pushing the claims of Catholics along with their own. Although these claims were pressed by their "self appointed champion", Frederick Augustus Hervey, the Earl Bishop of Deny, and by other northern delegates, the plan of reform was drawn up without any reference to the rights denied Catholics.

A bill was presented in the Irish House of Commons by Henry Flood. Dressed in his Volunteer uniform, he instructed the city and county Volunteers who had processed with the Convention delegates to the Rotunda, a mile distant, not to disband until they knew the outcome of the debate. The resulting armed muster and display, whose purpose in 1782 had been to impress Dublin Castle and the government in London, now appeared to be directed at the Parliament itself, and particular at its "undertakers", the powerful borough patrons. They had rallied to the cause of legislative independence (it "cost them nothing") but were known to oppose reform.

Broader schemes of reform had been proposed. William Sharman, chairman of the Ulster Volunteers' correspondence committee, published the reply he had received from Charles Lennox, the liberal Duke of Richmond urging universal suffrage. But the digested bill sought only to enlarge the boundaries of the more obviously "decayed" boroughs so to achieve a modest extension of the still exclusively Protestant freehold franchise. The more consequential provision might have been its exclusion from the Commons of government office-holders. Leave to introduce the bill was nonetheless defeated, and by a margin made all the wider by the opposition of Grattan. In an intervention he insisted was a rebuke to the Volunteers, not a rejection of reform, Grattan joined the Attorney General, Barry Yelverton, in refusing to receive "propositions at the point of the bayonet".

=== Grattan's repudiation of the "new" Volunteers ===
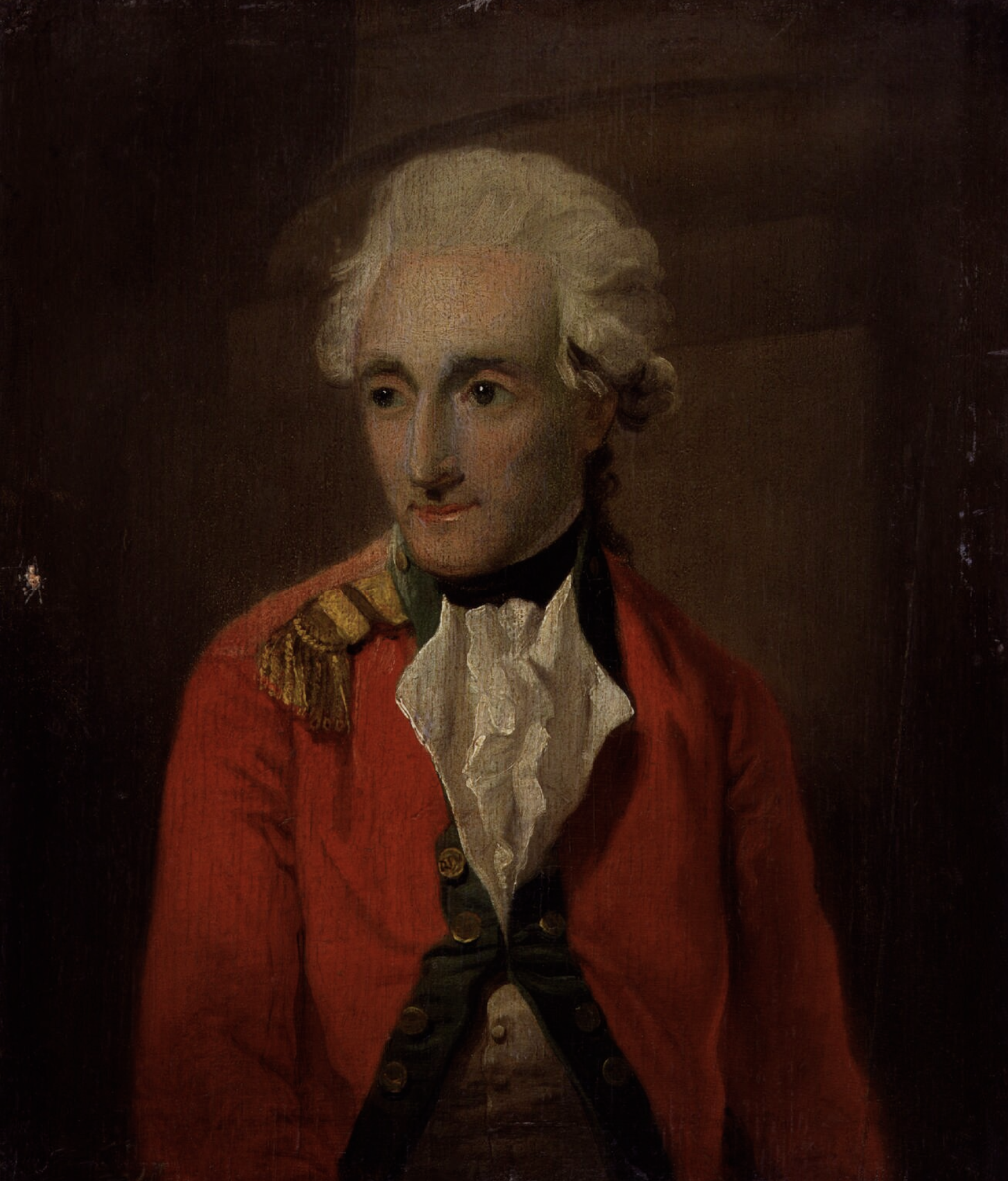
1780 portrait of Grattan in his Volunteers uniform

Grattan argued that while the Volunteers "rescued the constitution" in 1782, they had done so by standing "at the back of parliament", supporting the legislature in the exercise of its exclusive rights. Now, in presenting a reform bill without prior petitions to register support in the counties, and standing armed about the streets of the capital, they were attempting to "dictate" to parliament. It was, Grattan proposed, a measure of how far the Volunteers had "degenerated".

Charlemont's protégé, Francis Dobbs, observed that while "the aristocracy" in the movement (Charlemont, the "Volunteer earl", among them), are "taught by their own vanity to court democracy", the private Volunteer, subject only to officers he elects, is "ennobled, . . . no longer a timid slave . . . but a free subject, proud that he can own a uniform". As membership peaked in the winter of 1781-82 at 80,000, the social barrier that had been represented by the cost of this sometimes elaborate uniform, was giving way under the force of this "new lesson in equality". Already in June 1778, a company had formed in the city of Derry composed entirely of tradesmen. By 1783, companies were being formed with cheap uniforms or, indeed, with no uniforms.

Drawing the attention of the Commons to the "drilling the lowest classes of the populace", Grattan sounded an alarm. The "old, the original Volunteers", whose uniform he had been proud to wear, "had become respectable because they represented the property of the nation". But attempts were now being made "to arm the poverty of the kingdom". Originally "the armed property", were Volunteers, he asked, to become the armed beggary? Similarly impressed by the changing character of the Volunteers, the Lord Lieutenant complained of "great quantities of arms ... being scattered through the very lowest section of the population".

Robert Stewart, and Charlemont, president of the Convention, advised the Volunteers to receive their rebuff quietly. In their final meeting, delegates voted an address that did no more than implore the king not to impute their "humble wish to have certain manifest perversions of parliamentary representation remedied" to "any spirit of innovation". Parliament, meanwhile, with Grattan's support, took the precaution of voting new funds both for the regular army, whose troops, following their defeat at Yorktown, had begun to flood back from America, and for a government-controlled militia.

A further National Volunteer Congress was called for in October 1784, but poorly attended and divided by the commitment to a purely Protestant franchise, it broke up without resolution.

== Division over Catholic emancipation ==
=== Decline ===
Finding it intolerable that there should be "a body of troops independent of and unconnected with the state", in 1784 Dublin Castle again canvassed the possibility of rendering it "high treason for bodies of men to assemble as Volunteers with arms, uniforms, accoutrements, etc., without a legal commission from government". The cabinet in London was unconvinced, believing that a direct proscription was likely to bolster the falling popularity of the movement.

By Dublin Castle's own estimates, within two years of their peak in the summer of 1782, Volunteers numbers had fallen from 88,800 to 18,500. The cabinet concluded that it would be better to accord the Volunteers "the old soldier's privilege of simply fading away".

=== Formation of "united" companies ===
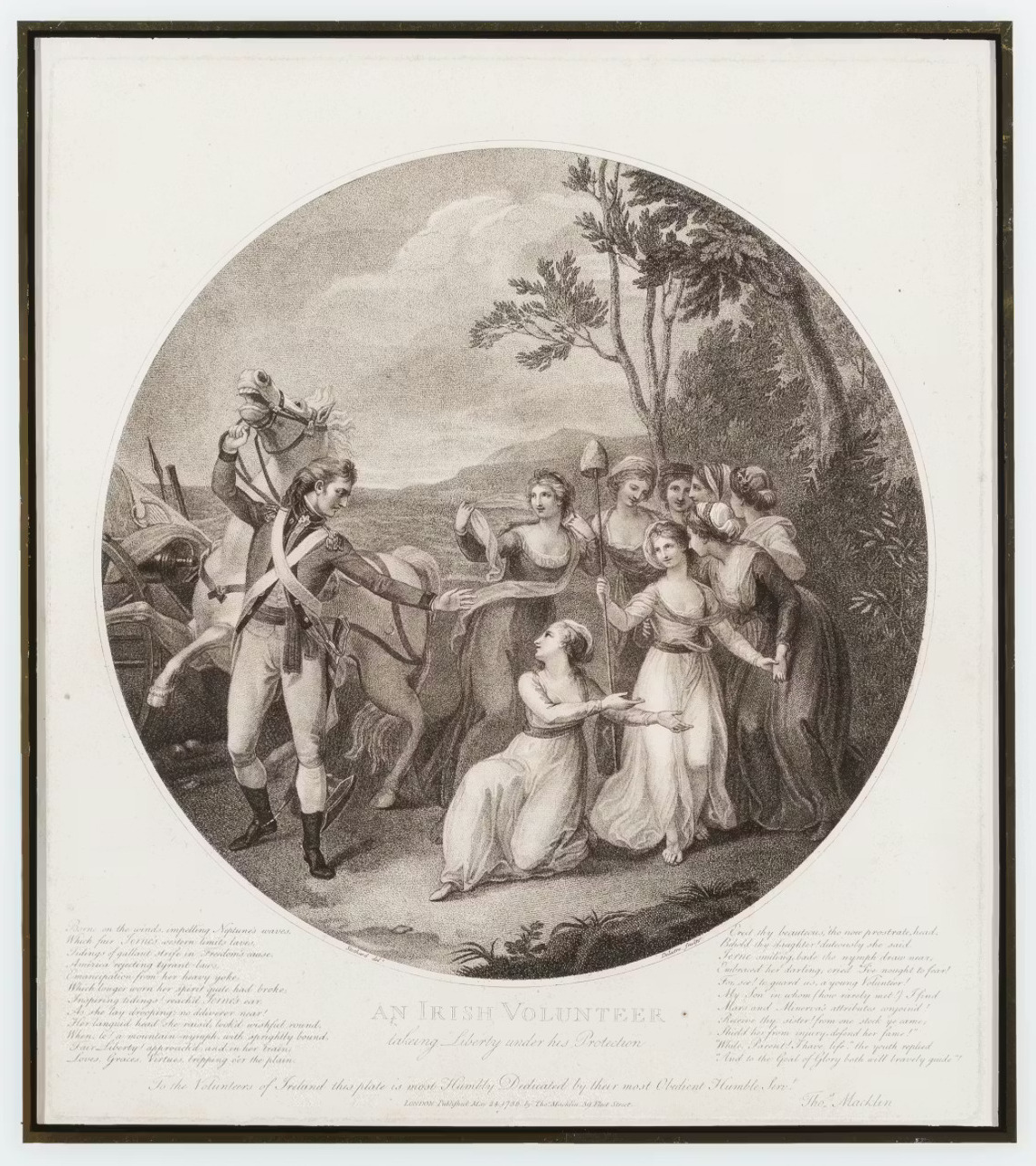
An Irish Volunteer Taking Liberty Under His Protection (1786)

The early historian of the movement, Thomas MacNevin, suggests that with the Convention in Dublin, the Volunteers of 1782 as a body "practically expired". Volunteering "lingered for some years", holding annual reviews, and passing addresses and resolutions, but "without effect". Yet within their diminishing ranks, particularly in Ulster where numbers fell less precipitously, MacNevin observed a radical shift. While the "aristocratic party" in Dublin were content with the "Constitution of 1782", northern Volunteers "had begun to perceive" that "a reformed parliament, independent of England" would never be achieved without the co-operation of Catholics.

This had been the position represented at the Dublin Convention by William Todd Jones, a captain of the Lisburn Fusilier Corps of Volunteers, who with William Sharman, a lieutenant-colonel of the Moira (or Union) Volunteers, was newly returned from Lisburn as a Member of Parliament. In a borough with an exceptionally broad "potwalloper" franchise (one in which "any [Protestant] man with a pot [and] a hearth to place it on" could vote), the two Volunteer officers had defeated the candidates of the local landlord, the Marquess of Hertford. After Flood's reform scheme was again dismissed by the Commons in March 1784, Todd's proposal for a Catholic alliance found broader favour.

In June 1783, delegates of 39 Volunteer corps, reviewed in Belfast, had already resolved: "That an era so honourable to the spirit, wisdom, and loyalty of Ireland, A MORE EQUAL REPRESENTATION of the People in Parliament deserves the deliberate attention of every Irishman". Such resolutions were now being approved in counties Antrim (where it had been reported that no company had more than seven Catholics) and Down. Joining Belfast, local Volunteers, began inviting to their ranks "persons of every religious persuasion".

In the wake of the Catholic Relief Act of 1778, in Wexford and Waterford some Catholics, in defiance of the law which forbade them to carry arms without licence, had tried to set up their own independent companies, and as early as June 1779 a few gained entry to existing corps, and some, as with the Limerick Independents, and Bandon Cavalry (Cork) in 1782 by general invitation. But in the wake of the humiliation that had attended the attempt to pursue reform within an exclusively Protestant Constitution, there was a conscious effort to create mixed "united" companies.

In the spring of 1784, the Liberty Volunteers in Dublin, led by the later United Irish conspirator Napper Tandy, had their exercises boycotted by other Volunteer companies in city in protest against their new enlistees being not only "of the lowest class" but chiefly Roman Catholic. Catholics found a less contested welcome in Belfast's First Company, "the Greens", who opened their ranks in the conviction that "a general Union of all the inhabitants of Ireland is necessary to the freedom and prosperity of this kingdom". In May, they were joined by the town's Second Company, "the Blues", in demonstration of the new united ethos: a parade to mark the inaugural mass at St Mary's Chapel, Belfast's first Catholic church, for which they had made "a handsome collection".

=== Armagh disturbances and creation of the Orange Order ===
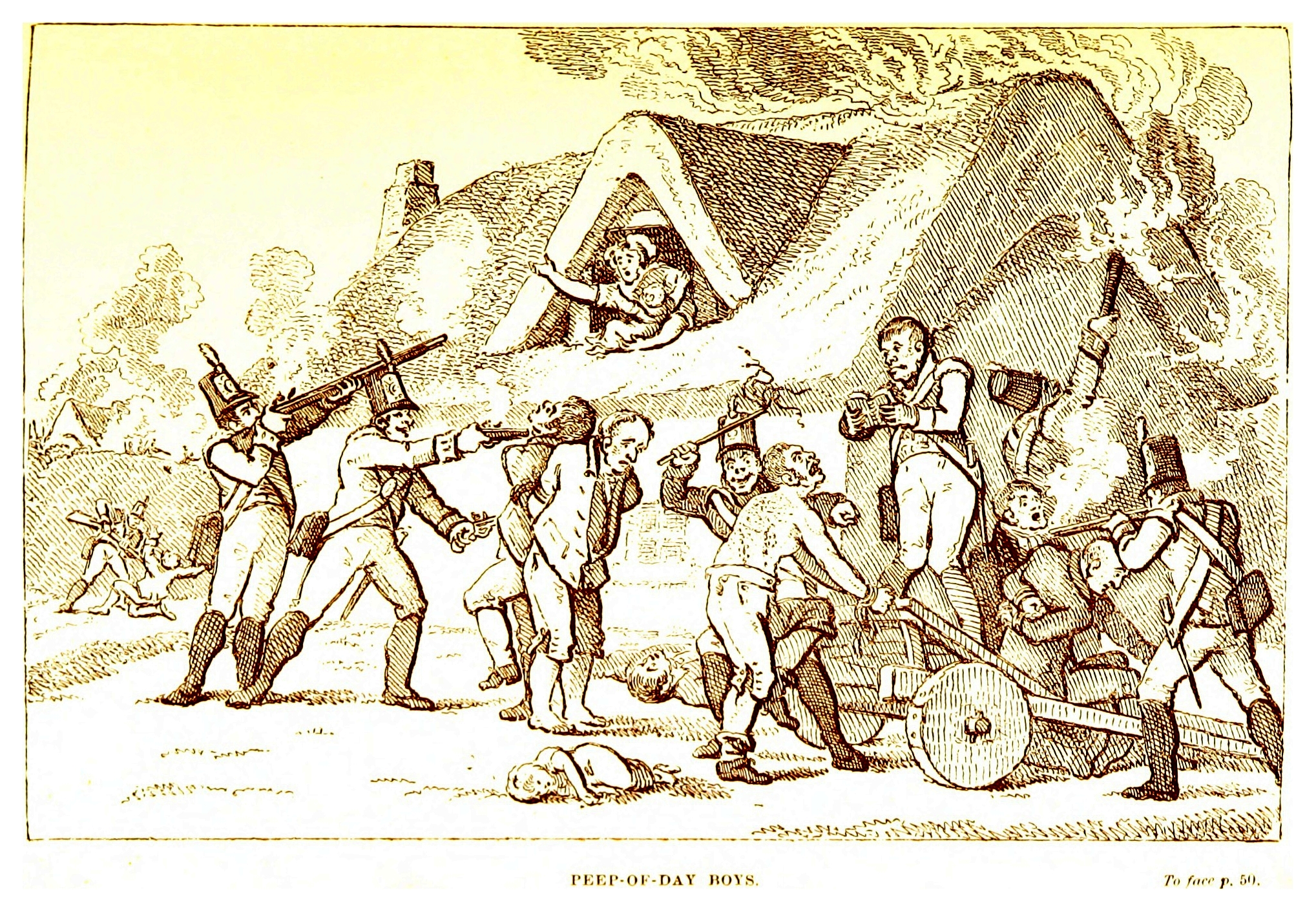
1888 cartoon of the Peep o' Day Boys (but as the villains are in uniform, more plausibly their allies, Lord Charlemont's Volunteers)

The admission of Catholics to united companies was not sufficient counter the rapid "fall off of interest Volunteering" after the debacle of the national reform convention, and in Ulster, where it went some way to maintaining numbers, it divided the movement. While the call for Catholic emancipation might find support in Belfast and surrounding Protestant-majority districts, in the Plantation counties west of the River Bann, where a Protestant minority increasingly competed with Catholics for tenancies and employment and harboured bitter memories of the Irish Rebellion of 1641, veterans of the Volunteer movement were not as easily persuaded. The Armagh Volunteers, who had called the first Ulster Convention in 1782, notably boycotted a third in 1793 when it was clear that both reform and emancipation would be on the agenda.

In County Armagh, the first admission of Catholics to the ranks triggered a reorganisation of Volunteers under Lord Charlemont into new companies expressly committed to Catholic exclusion and to pan-Protestant unity. Volunteers in these companies collaborated with, and moonlighted as, Peep o' Day Boys, Protestant vigilantes who, on the pretext of searching for illegally held arms, wrecked Catholic homes, setting their inhabitants out upon the road. The resulting "Armagh disturbances" culminated in September 1795 in the Battle of the Diamond. Peep o' Day Boys carrying, in addition to weapons provided by the local gentry, Volunteer muskets, routed a force of Catholic Defenders killing, depending on reports, between six and thirty.

Gathered in Loughgall, the victors founded the Orange Order, a sworn association pledged to defend "the King and his heirs so long as he or they support the Protestant Ascendancy". Meanwhile, of the 7,000 Catholics subsequently displaced from the county, some found shelter on Presbyterian farms in counties Down and Antrim organised by a new group of Volunteer veterans, the Society of United Irishmen. The "United men" were pledged to "a brotherhood of affection" and "a union of power among Irishmen of every religious persuasion".

== The final years ==
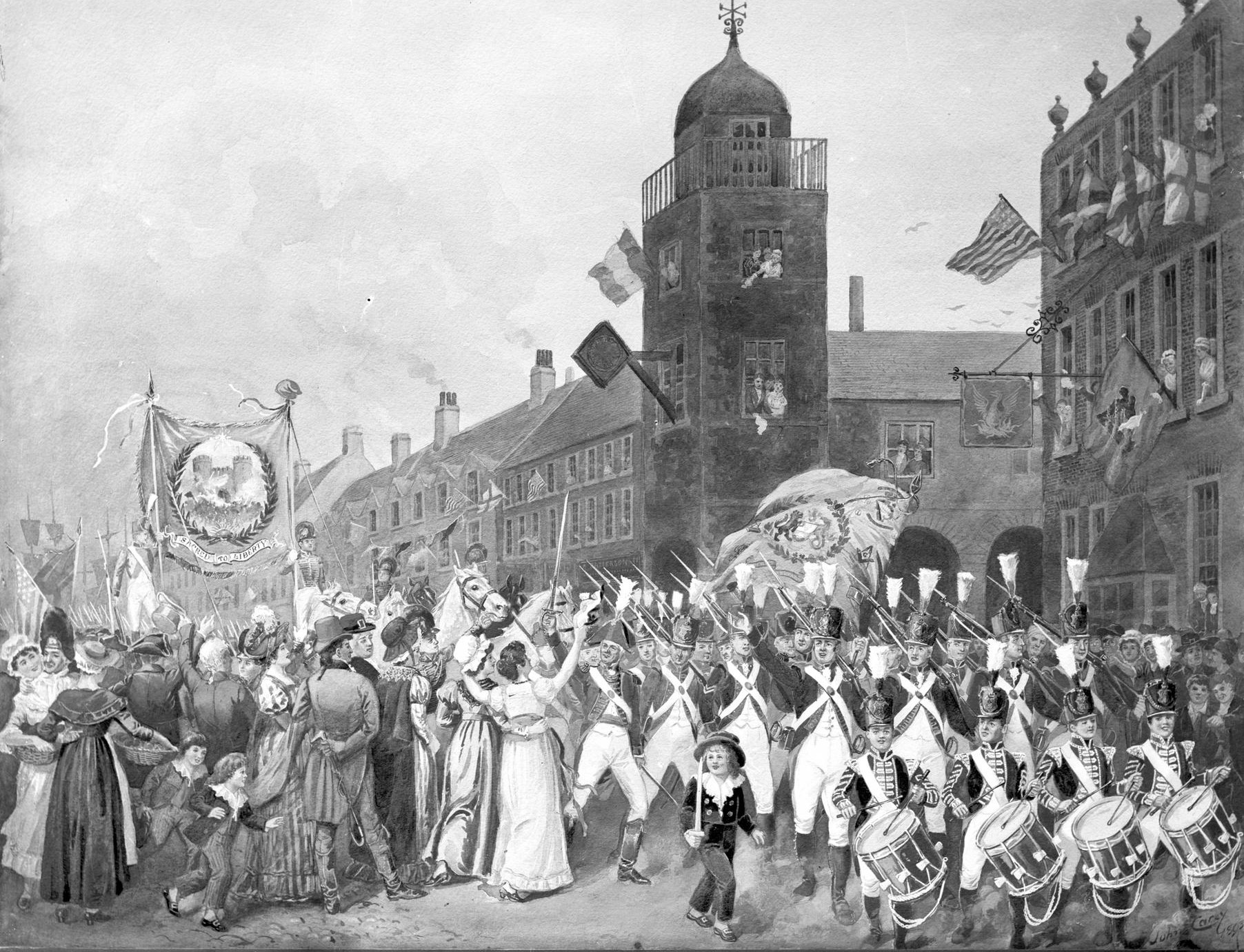
Bastille Day, 1792, Belfast. Volunteer companies parade "the Colours of Five Free Nations, viz.: Flag of Ireland – motto, Unite and be free. Flag of America – motto, The Asylum of Liberty. Flag of France – motto, The Nation, the Law, and the King. Flag of [Constitutional] Poland – motto, We will support it. Flag of Great Britain – motto, Wisdom, Spirit, and Liberality."

=== Bastille Day celebrations and the United Irish ===
On news of revolutionary events in France, Volunteerism revived. In the French Declaration of the Rights of Man and of the Citizen and Civil Constitution of the Clergy, the greatest of the Catholic powers was seen to be undergoing its own Glorious Revolution. In his Reflections on the Revolution in France (1790), Edmund Burke had sought to discredit any analogy with 1688 in England. But invited north by Volunteers in October 1791, Wolfe Tone, a Protestant secretary of the Catholic Committee in Dublin, found that Thomas Paine's response to Burke, the Rights of Man was already the "Koran of Belfast".

Three months before, on 14 July, the second anniversary of the Fall of the Bastille had been celebrated with a triumphal Volunteer procession through Belfast and a solemn Declaration to the Great and Gallant people of France: "As Irishmen, We too have a country, and we hold it very dear – so dear... that we wish all Civil and Religious Intolerance annihilated in this land." There were also celebrations in Dublin and in towns across Ulster. In Randalstown, a Volunteer meeting enunciated the new revolutionary credo:

We believe that a nation has a right to form, maintain, and perfect its constitution, and to regulate at pleasure everything relating to government. We believe a nation has an inherent right to change its constitution, and therefore we believe that the Revolution in France to be founded in the law of nature and of nations caused by tyranny and oppression, and sanctioned by dire necessity

In 1792, Bastille Day in Belfast was greeted with similar scenes and an address to the French National Assembly hailing the soldiers of the new republic as "the advance guard of the world". A further address To The People of Ireland, occasioned an intervention by Tone's hosts. They had succeeded in having Tone elected an honorary member of their Volunteer company, the Greens, and now proposed, as United Irishmen, a decisive break with the temporising politics of Waddell Cunningham, their long-standing commander. In the public debate, Cunningham had proposed hedging the commitment to an equality of "all sects and denominations of Irishmen", preferring rather "the gradual emancipation of our Roman Catholic brethren". Expressing "astonishment at hearing... any part of the address called a Catholic question" the United Irishmen had the amendment voted down on grounds that the only question was "whether Irishmen should be free".

Tone had been invited to Belfast as the author of An Argument on behalf of the Catholics of Ireland, a tract whose circulation in Ireland only Paine's Rights of Man was to surpass. The Argument embraced what had been the most advanced Volunteer position at the Dungannon and Dublin conventions: that the key to constitutional reform was Catholic emancipation. So long as "illiberal", "bigoted" and "blind" Irish Protestants indulged their fears of "Popery" and of Catholic repossession of forfeited property, the "boobies and blockheads" in Parliament and Dublin Castle would prevail. The choice was stark: either "Reform, the Catholics, justice and liberty" or "an unconditional submission to the present, and every future administration".

=== Catholic relief and the suppression of Voluntarism ===
With the support and participation of United Irishmen, in December 1792 the Catholic Committee in Dublin convened a national Catholic Convention. Conducted on a broad, head-of-household, franchise, in every Catholic parish in the Kingdom, and in "a blaze of publicity", its election was a direct challenge to the legitimacy of the Irish Lords and Commons. The king himself acknowledged the Convention's mandate by agreeing in January 1793 to meet a delegation at Windsor.

In advance of war with the anti-clerical French Republic, the British government was solicitous of Catholic opinion, both at home and abroad. While it retained for Parliament itself, and for the higher state and judicial offices, the exclusionary Oath of Supremacy, in 1791 it had re-admitted Catholics to the parliamentary franchise in Great Britain. With the Irish Catholic delegates it agreed that Dublin Castle would whip the necessary votes behind Grattan to have the same measure enacted in Ireland. There was, however, a price for the pressure and patronage required to override Ascendancy opposition: beginning with the agreement of the Catholic Committee to dissolve itself, the government insisted on end to all further extra-parliamentary opposition.

The Catholic Relief Act 1793 was accompanied by a Convention Act that outlawed "the election or appointment of assemblies purporting to represent the people". There was also a new Militia Act. Holding it "essential to safety and protection of this realm and its constitution" that there be "a respectable military force, under officer possessing land property within this kingdom", the preamble gave statutory expression to something of the original Volunteer ethos. But officers took their commission from the Crown and commanded not volunteers but Catholics (to whom the right to bear arms had been restored), as well as Protestants, conscripted by lot.

There was resistance to the choice the government was forcing upon the movement. In January 1793, the Masonic Lodge in Rasharkin, County Antrim, resolved to form themselves into a new Voluntary corps. At a time when "the tranquility of the country seems endangered by the circulation of inflammatory and seditious publications", this was to be testimony both to their steadfast loyalty to the Crown, and of their "wish for a fair and equal representation of all the people in Parliament, which would, of course, bring about the redress of all real grievances".

Already in December 1792, the mustering of Volunteer companies in Dublin City and County was banned by proclamation. In March 1793, after the third Dungannon convention renewed the call for reform, the Lord Lieutenant issued the same injunction for Belfast and adjacent districts. In September, when Volunteers planned a review near Doagh in County Antrim, they had ammunition dispatched in secret a few days prior to companies with serviceable arms so that they might resist any opposition they encountered. When they learned that the opposition was to be the 38th Regiment, the Fermanagh Militia, and a detachment of Artillery, the review was abandoned.

Volunteers accepted paid commissions in the Militia, with some, in consequence, finding themselves in command of Catholics whose right to bear arms they had opposed. More (Cunningham among them) were to favour the part-time Yeomanry, an almost exclusively Protestant force organised from September 1796, officered by the local gentry but paid, clothed, and armed by the government.

=== The National Volunteers and the path to rebellion ===
The United Irishmen meanwhile had been driving new recruitment in an attempt to recast the Volunteerism on the lines of the revolutionary French "National Guard". In December 1792, a new "National Volunteers" company was formed in Dublin, and reportedly pledged "not [to] lay down until they have obtained the privileges desired by Roman Catholics and a reform of parliament. The following month, the Belfast News Letter reported the Reverend Thomas Ledlie Birch, a United Irishman, leading his Presbyterian congregation in Saintfield in unanimous resolve to add 500 of their number "to the National Guards of Ireland".

When, in May 1794, the Dublin Castle found evidence of communication with the French Directory (implicating Tone among others), the Society of United Irishmen and their guard companies were proscribed.

In May 1795, a Belfast conference of United societies approved new clandestine system of organisation, through which, in coordination with the Defenders, they were to move toward the ill-fated risings of the spring and summer of 1798. The rebellion saw veterans of the Volunteers on either side of a struggle that contributed to the destruction of their common achievement. The Constitution of 1782 was upended by the Act of Union 1800. The Irish Parliament, in which to protest Grattan made a last appearance, dressed in his Volunteer uniform, was abolished. Its still wholly Protestant representation was transferred to Westminster which proceeded to legislate for Ireland as the Parliament of the United Kingdom.

=== The British Volunteers ===
In 1794, Volunteer Corps were raised in Great Britain, but they were not, as Ireland, independent associations. Possibly learning from the Irish experience, the government ensured that in the "Plan of Augmentation for the Forces for Internal Defence" companies were licensed by county lords lieutenants, and formed under officers commissioned by the Crown.

The Volunteers, however, were not explicitly loyalist in the sense that they made no declaration against constitutional reform and their commitment to maintaining internal order was "confined to the tumults and insurrections that, it was feared, would accompany [a French] invasion". In keeping the peace, for example in response to the wartime food riots, they could prove unreliable. But in general, contemporaries credited their presence with intimidating the disaffected. The British Volunteers were disbanded in 1813 although, as in Ireland, continued fear of civil insurrection led to the retention of Yeomanry units.

== Legacy ==
1914 recruitment poster for the National Volunteers

The Irish historian Thomas Bartlett suggests that the Volunteers of 1782 launched a paramilitary tradition in Irish politics, one in which, whether nationalist or unionist, "the force of argument" is "trumped by the argument of force".

The Ulster Volunteers, founded in 1912 to oppose the restoration of an Irish parliament, made frequent reference to their Volunteer forbearers. They shared many features such as regional strength, leadership, and a Protestant recruitment base. Their nationalist counterparts, the new Irish Volunteers formed in November 1913, were consciously modelled on their northern rivals, but their founders, including Eoin MacNeill and Patrick Pearse, also invoked the armed 18th-century patriots.

Denis McCullough and Bulmer Hobson of the Irish Republican Brotherhood (IRB) had established the Dungannon Clubs in 1905 "to celebrate those icons of the constitutionalist movement, the Irish Volunteers of 1782". Their failing, according to MacNeill, was "not that they did not fight but that they did not maintain their organisation till their objects had been secured".

Following Britain's declaration of war upon Germany in August 1914, Captain Jack White, who the year before had help form the Irish Citizen Army during the great Dublin lock-out, wrote a memorandum to Lord Kitchener and Sir Ian Hamilton proposing that the new Volunteers serve as an Irish home guard. In contrast to the call of the Irish Home Rule leader, John Redmond, for his "National Volunteers" to enlist as for imperial service, this would have had men paid and equipped by the British but remain, like the Volunteers of old, under their own command at home. He found his comrades no less suspicious than the government: "I was taken to be recruiting for Britain, whereas I was trying to use Britain to put Ireland into a position to enforce her own claims". White was dismissed from his Volunteer commands.

One of the mottos used by the Volunteer's Quis Separabit, meaning "who shall separate us", which was in use by them from at least 1781, is also used by the Order of St. Patrick (founded in 1783), and is used by several Irish British Army regiments such as the Royal Dragoon Guards, Royal Ulster Rifles (previously Royal Irish Rifles), 4th Royal Irish Dragoon Guards, 88th Regiment of Foot (Connaught Rangers) and its successor the Connaught Rangers. It was also adopted by the anti-home rule organisation, the Ulster Defence Union whose principal aim was to resist the Second Home Rule Bill of 1893, and is also the motto of the paramilitary Ulster Defence Force formed in 1971 during the Northern Ireland Troubles.

== Organisation ==
=== Structure ===
The flag of the Dublin Volunteers

Originally each Volunteer company or corps was an independent force, typically consisting of 60 to 80 men, raised in each parish where the number of Protestants made it viable. Alongside the parish companies, towns had one or more companies. For officers a company had as its highest rank, a captain, followed by a lieutenant, and ensign. They also had surgeons and chaplains. Volunteer members accepted no pay, however the more wealthy amongst them shared their funds with their poorer comrades, with officers donating towards the company's stock purse.

As new Volunteer corps were being raised throughout the county, a delegate meeting was held in Clare in December 1779, where it was resolved to form these corps into battalions, under the command of "colonels" and to raise artillery companies to complement them. Battalions might consist of ten to twelve companies, under the command of a "colonel". In Ulster these in turn formed "regiments" so that Charlemont, captain of the First Armagh Company, became colonel of the Southern Battalion of the First Ulster Regiment of which he was the general in command.

Unlike some of the volunteer militias formed earlier in the 18th century, which had Crown commissioned officers, the private members of Volunteer companies elected their own officers, and retained the right to dismiss them for misconduct or incapacity. Francis Dobbs, for example, despite enjoying Charlemont's favour, was dismissed from the Southern Battalion of the First Ulster Regiment, at the insistence of the ranks, for also taking a commission as a government's Fencible.

=== Uniform ===
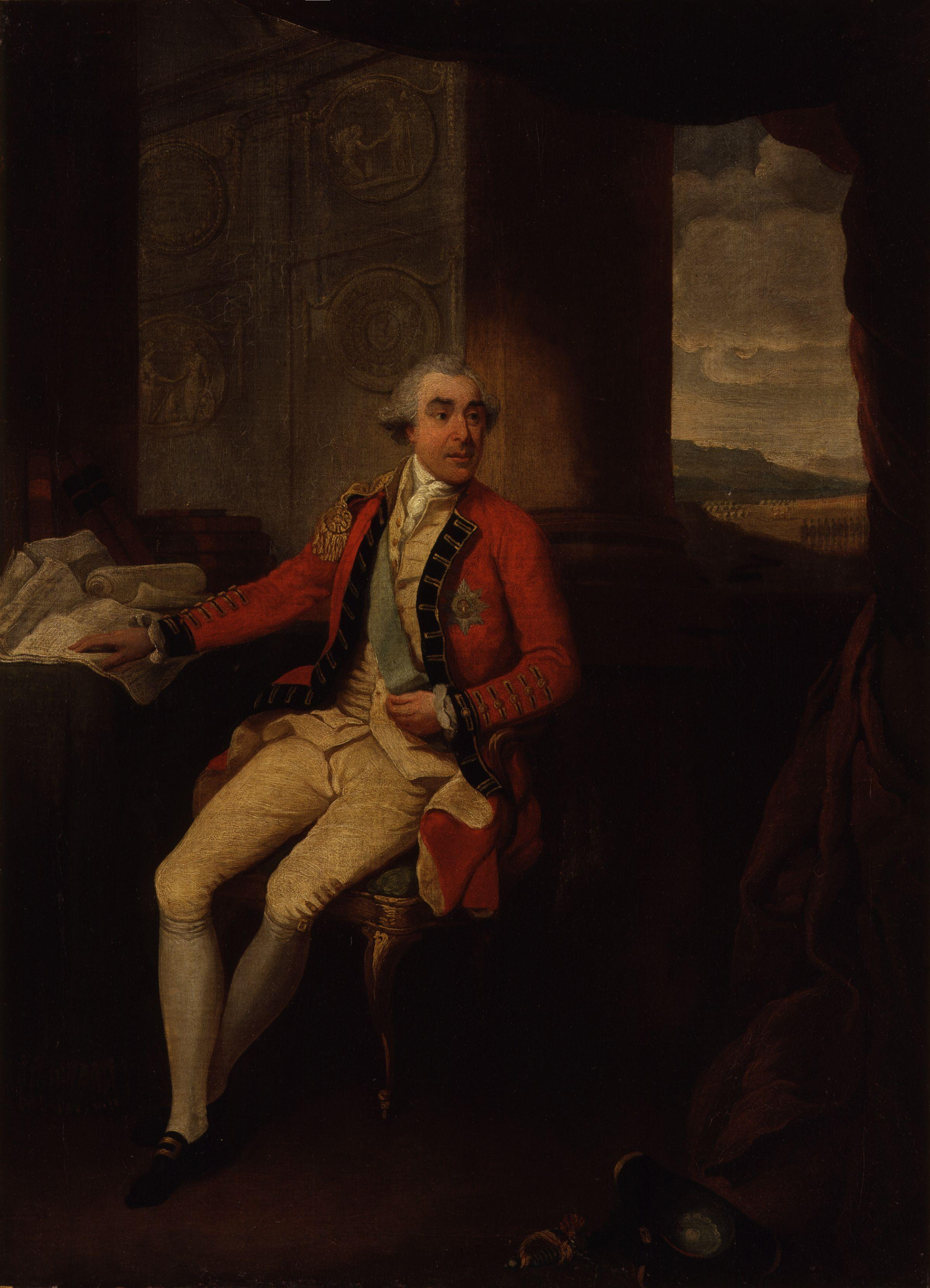
c. 1783 portrait of Lord Charlemont in his Volunteers uniform

Of the 154 companies of Volunteers listed in The Volunteer's Companion (1784); 114 had scarlet uniforms, 18 blue, 6 green, 1 dark green, 1 white, 1 grey, 1 buff, and 12 undetailed. The details of the uniform of each corps varied depending on their choice of colouring for the facing on their uniforms, and for some the lace and buttons, amongst other pieces, for example: the Glin Royal Artillery's uniform was "Blue, faced blue; scarlet cuffs and capes; gold lace", whilst the Offerlane Blues' uniform was "Scarlet, faced blue; silver lace". The Aghavoe Loyals had "scarlet, faced blue", whilst the Castle Durrow Volunteers wore green uniforms faced with white and silver lining.

Charlemont desired that all county companies should have the same Crown-forces style uniform of scarlet coats with white facings. However, many companies stuck by their own choice of colours. Whilst information is scant, it has been suggested that most uniforms were made locally, with badges, buttons, cloth, and hats being procured from places like Belfast and Dublin. The Belfast News Letter carried advertisements from merchants offering: plated and gilt Volunteer buttons, furnished belt and pouch plates, engravings, regimental uniform cloth, and even tents. The painting of Volunteer drums and colours was also offered.

Leading Volunteer and Patriot, Henry Grattan, is recorded as wearing a blue Volunteer uniform, although in Wheatley's 1780 painting The Irish House of Commons: Henry Grattan urging the Claims of Irish Right, 8 June 1780, Grattan is seen standing on the far right side of the canvas giving his speech and wearing a scarlet Volunteer uniform .

=== Reviews ===
Reviews of Volunteer corps were held since the earliest days of volunteering, with county companies travelling long distances to attend ones like the Belfast Reviews. Some reviews such as those in County Armagh originally were on a smaller scale, and consisted of a few companies assembling and performing field exercises in a particular district. They later became larger affairs with brigades consisting of battalions of companies.

The order of the day has been recorded for the Newry Review of 1785: most of the attending companies had marched to Newry on the Thursday, the day which Charlemont also arrived. On Friday the companies that formed the First Brigade assembled and marched to the review ground, where Charlemont would inspect them. His arrival was announced by the firing of nine cannons. On the Saturday, the same ceremony was repeated for the Second Brigade. Field exercises demonstrated an attack and defence of Newry.

As the period of the Volunteers drew to an end, such reviews were scaled back, with the ranks preferring to meet locally with a few other companies during the summer for drilling and improvement.

=== Motifs and memorabilia ===
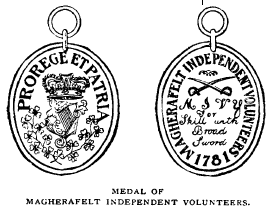
Drawing of the medal awarded to the First Magherafelt Volunteers for skill with broadsword.

The primary motif of the Volunteers was an Irish harp with the British crown mounted above it, with either the name of the company or a motto curved around it, or both, i.e. "Templepatrick Infantry" or "Liberty & Our Country". This harp and crown motif was prevalent on the Volunteer companies flags, belt-plates and gorgets. Some included the Royal cypher "G.R." standing for King George III. Shamrocks also commonly featured.

An alternative to the British Crown was the "Milesian crown", promoted and used by Volunteer companies as a symbol of their commitment to reform. Its origins are elusive, but the name alludes to the, Milesians, whose legendary colonisation of Ireland from Iberia was used for centuries by both Gaelic and English writers to win and secure dynastic and political legitimacy.

Common mottos included: Quis Separabit (none shall separate), For Our King & Country, Pro Rege et Patria (for King and Fatherland), and Pro Caesare, Pro Aeris et Focis (for our King, out altars, and out hearths). But there were also variations that, perhaps significantly, dropped reference to the King: in addition to Liberty & Our Country", simply Pro Patria (for the Fatherland) or Pro Aeris et Focis (for our altars and our hearths).

The bowl that was used as the pledging-cup of the Volunteers at the first convention was rediscovered in the 1930s in County Tyrone. This bowl was tub-shaped, resembling an Irish mether, and had the original owner's (John Bell) crest and initials engraved on the inside, as well as on the wooden base of it. Decorating this pledging-cup was three silver hoops bearing nine toasts, each of which was numbered as follows: 1. The King, 2. The Queen, 3. The Royal Family, 4. The Memory of St. Patrick, 5. The Sons of St. Patrick, 6. The Daughters of St. Patrick, 7. The Irish Volunteers, 8. The Friends of Ireland, 9. A Free Trade.

An obelisk commemorating the Dungannon Convention of 1782, was erected that year by Sir Capel Molyneux, on a hill a few miles northeast of Armagh city. On it is the following inscription: "This obelisk was erected by the Right Hon. Sir Capel Molyneux, of Castle Dillon, Bart., in the year 1782, to commemorate the glorious revolution which took place in favour of the constitution of the kingdom, under the auspices of the Volunteers of Ireland."

Competitions were held between Volunteer corps, with medals given out as marks of distinction for the best marksmen, swordsmen, as well as for the most efficient soldiers. The members of Volunteer corps from the province of Ulster, more specifically from the counties of Antrim, Armagh, Down, Londonderry, and Tyrone featured quite prominently and took an honourable place. Examples of marksmen competitions included best shot with ball and best target shot at 100 yards. Rewards of merit were also given.

== See also ==
- List of Irish Volunteer corps
- Ireland 1691-1801
- Irish Volunteers, a paramilitary organisation established in 1913
