= Dobbie =

Dobbie is a surname of Scottish origin. Notable people with the surname include:

- Alexander Williamson Dobbie (1843–1912), engineer and retailer in South Australia
- Allison Dobbie MNZM, New Zealand librarian
- Dane Dobbie (born 1986), Canadian lacrosse player
- Dorothy Dobbie (born 1945), Canadian politician
- Gillian Dobbie, New Zealand computer scientist
- James Johnston Dobbie (1852–1924), Scottish chemist studied alkaloids
- John Dobbie (bowls) (1914-2005), Australian international lawn bowler
- Joseph Dobbie, Liberal MP for Ayr Burghs (UK Parliament constituency) from 1904 to 1906
- Stephen Dobbie (born 1982), Scottish former professional footballer
- Thomas William Dobbie (1829–1908), Canadian civil engineer, provincial land surveyor and political figure
- William Dobbie GCMG, KCB, DSO (1879–1964), British Army veteran of the Second Boer War, and two World Wars
- William Dobbie (politician) CBE (1878–1950), British Labour politician

== See also ==
- Dobbie or Dobby, a type of fairground roundabout that has no floor, with its ride-on figures being suspended from its roof
- Dobbie Literary Award
- Dobby (disambiguation)
- Dobbe
- Dobe
