= Dobber =

Dobber may refer to:

== People ==
- Andrzej Dobber (born 1961), Polish operatic singer (baritone)
- Rini Dobber (born 1943), Dutch Olympic swimmer
- Bob Lanier, (1948–2022), nicknamed "The Dobber", an American professional basketball player

== Other uses ==
- Dobber (merchandise), shirts, jeans, and license plates associated with Glenn Dobbs
- Philip "Dobber" Dobson, a character on the British ITV show Coronation Street
- A size of marble

== See also ==
- Dob (disambiguation)
