= List of Irish Volunteer corps =

Below is a list of the 18th century Irish Volunteer corps, alongside details such as their uniform and leaders. Names with an asterisk (*) after them attended the National Convention of 1782.

== Generals in 1782 ==
- The Earl of Charlemont (commander-in-chief)
- Duke of Leinster*
- Sir William Parsons*
- Sir Barry Denny*
- Right Honourable George Ogle*
- Right Honourable Henry King*
- Sir James Stratford Tynte*

== Miscellaneous companies, battalions, and regiments ==
Name	County	Date associated	Uniform	Officers
First Volunteers of Ireland		1 July 1766	Scarlet, faced blue	Colonel Sir Vefey Colclough
Kilkenny Rangers	Kilkenny	2 January 1770	Green, with silver lace	Colonel Mossom, Major Wemys
Offerlane Blues	King's County	10 October 1773	Scarlet, faced blue; silver lace	Colonel Luke Flood
Rosanalle's Volunteers		1 July 1774	Scarlet, faced blue; silver lace	Colonel Richard Croasdall; Major George Sandes; Captains L.Sanders, J. Sabatier, A. Johnson; Lieutenant William Tracey
Independent Wexford Light Dragoons	Wexford	Autumn 1775	Scarlet, faced blue	Colonel John Beauman
Parson's Town Loyal Independents	King's County	15 February 1776	Scarlet, faced black; silver lace	Colonel Sir William Parsons*; Major L. Parsons; Captain B. B. Warbuton; Lieutenants Edward Tracey, Kearney; Surgeon William Wilkinson
Rathdowney Volunteers	Queen's County	February 1776	Scarlet, faced white	Colonel F. Palmer*
Glin Royal Artillery	Limerick	April 1776	Blue, faced blue; scarlet cuffs and capes; gold lace	Colonel F. Fitzgerald*; Lieutenant-colonel Thomas Burgess
Tipperary Volunteers	Tipperary	1 May 1776	Scarlet, faced black; silver lace	Captain James Roe
Maryborough Volunteers	Queen's County	May 1776	Scarlet, faced black	Colonel Sir J. Parnell
Limerick Independents	Limerick	September 1776	Scarlet, faced green; silver lace	Colonel John Prendergast*; Major C. Powel*
Tyrell's Pass Volunteers	Westmeath	1776	Grey, scarlet faced; silver lace	Captain Honourable Robert Moore
Edenderry Union	King's County	1 May 1777	Scarlet, faced black	Captain Shaw Cartland
Aldborough Legion		August 1777	Scarlet, faced black; silver lace	Colonel Earl of Aldborough*
Limavady Battalion	Londonderry	7 November 1777	Scarlet, faced black	Colonel James Boyle
New Ross Independents	Wexford	17 November 1777	Scarlet, faced black	Colonel B. Elliot
Drogheda Association	Louth	1777	Scarlet, faced pomona green; gold laced hats	Colonel Mead Ogle*; Lieutenant-colonel H. Montgomery Lyons*; Major William Chessire; Captain Oliver Fairtlough; Captain Lieutenant William Holmes; Lieutenant John Ackland
Dunlavin Light Dragoons	Wicklow	1777	Scarlet, faced blue; silver epaulettes	Colonel William Perse*
Roxborough Volunteers	Galway	1777	Scarlet, faced blue; faced black	William Persse; Colonel Andrew Armstrong; Captain Robert Shervington
Aughrim Corps of Cork	Cork	17 March 1778	Scarlet, faced scarlet, edged white	Major Edward Jameson; Captain Samuel Rowland
Belfast Volunteer Company	Antrim	6 April 1778	Blue, faced blue; laced hats	Captain Brown
Dungiven Battlation	Londonderry	14 June 1778	Scarlet, faced black	Major Thomas Bond; Captain Thomas Fanning
Derry Fuzileers	Londonderry	14 June 1778	Scarlet, faced blue	Adjutant Henry Delap, E. C. Mayne
Raphoe Battalion	Donegal	1 July 1778	Scarlet, faced blue	Lieutenant-colonel Nisbitt*
Duleek Light Company	Meath	July 1778	Scarlet, faced black	Captain Thomas Trotter
Tullow Rangers	Carlow	August 1778	Scarlet, faced black; white buttons	Captain Whelan
Castle Durrow Light Horse	Queen's County	August 1778	Green, edged white	Captain Richard Lawrenson
Dublin Volunteers	Dublin	6 October 1778	Blue, faced blue, edged scarlet; yellow buttons	Colonel Duke of Leinster; Lieutenant-colonel H. Monck; Captain N. Warren*; Lieutenant E. Medlicott; Adjutant William Osbrey
Ennis Volunteers	Clare	12 October 1778	Scarlet, faced black	Colonel William Blood*
Echlin Vale Volunteers	Down	19 October 1778	Scarlet, faced white	Captain Charles Echlin
Tullamore True Blue Rangers	King's County	28 October 1778	Scarlet, faced blue; silver lace	Colonel Charles William Bury*
Monastereven Volunteers	Kildare	October 1778	Scarlet, faced white	Houlton Anderson
Mote Light Infantry	Meath	1778	Scarlet, faced deep green	Colonel D. G. Browne*; Lieutenant John Henry
Liney Volunteers		1778	Scarlet, faced blue	Major George Dodwell*
Barony of Forth Corps	Carlow and Wexford	1 January 1779	Scarlet, faced blue	Major Hughs
Charleville Infantry	Cork	4 January 1779	Blue, faced scarlet	Colonel Chidley Coote
Royal Tralee Volunteers	Kerry	7 January 1779	Scarlet, faced blue; gold lace	Colonel Sir Barry Denny*
Castlebar Independents	Mayo	17 March 1779	Scarlet, faced deep green	Colonel P. Randal MacDonnell
Goldsmith's Corps	Londonderry	17 March 1779	Blue, faced scarlet; gold lace	Captain Benjamin O'Brien
Callen Union	Kilkenny	1 April 1779	Green, edged white	Captain Elliot
Waterford Royal Battalion	Waterford	25 April 1779	Scarlet, faced blue	Major commandant William Alcock; Captain Robert Shapland Carew*
Waterford Artillery	Waterford			Captain Joshua Paul
Lawyers Corps		April 1779	Scarlet, faced blue; gold lace	Colonel Townly Patten Filgate
Lawyers Artillery				Captain William Holt
Finea Independents	Westmeath	1 May 1779	Scarlet, faced blue	Colonel Coyne Nugent
Craig (Queen's County) Volunteers	Queen's County	1 May 1779	Blue, faced scarlet; silver lace	Colonel B. Bagnell*
Roscommon Independent Forresters	Roscommon	1 May 1779	Scarlet, faced green	Colonel R. Walter; Lieutenant-colonel Thomas MacDermott; Mahor Edward Dowling; Sir Watkin Lewis (colonel of the London association)
Loyal Sligo Volunteers	Sligo	25 May 1779	Scarlet, faced white	Lieutenant-colonel Ormsby
Eyre Court Buffs	Galway	1 June 1779	Scarlet, faced buff; gold epaulettes	Colonel Giles Eyre; Captain Stephen Blake
Merchants Corps		9 June 1779	Scarlet, faced blue; gold lace	Captains Theos. Dixon, C. M. MacMahon
Merchants Artillery				Captain George Maquay
Kilkenny Volunteers	Kilkenny	10 June 1779	Blue, faced scarlet; gold lace	Colonel ThomasButler*; Lieutenant-colonel Knaresbrough*; Captains Laffan, Shananhan, Purcell; Lieutenants Duffy, MacLoughlin, Way, Shearman; Ensign Davis
Dunkerrin Volunteers	King's County	20 June 1779	Scarlet, faced black	Colonel J. F. Rolleston*
Rathdown (County of Dublin) Light Dragoons	Dublin	June 1779	Scarlet, faced black	Colonel Sir J. A. Johnson*
French Park Light Horse	Roscommon	June 1779	Scarlet, faced black, edged white; gold lace	Lieutenant-colonel Edward MacDermott; Lieutenant Owen MacDermott
Castledurrow Volunteers	Queen's County	1 July 1779	Green, edged white; silver lace	Captain Bathorn
Wicklow Forresters	Wicklow	1 July 1779	Scarlet, faced light blue	Colonel Samuel Hayes*; Captains Thomas King, Andrew Prior
Ossory True Blues	Queen's County	1 July 1779	Scarlet, edged blue	Colonel Edward Flood; Major Robert Palmer
Loyal Ballina and Ardnaree Volunteers	Mayo	1 July 1779	Scarlet, faced black	Colonel RIght Honourable Henry King*; Major Henry Cary
Ballintemple Forresters	Carlow	12 July 1779	Scarlet, faced blue	Captain's Stewart, W P Butler
Trim Infantry	Meath	12 July 1779	Scarlet, faced black	Captain W. H. Finlay;
Bantry Volunteers	Cork	12 July 1779	Scarlet, faced black, edged white	Francis Hoskin
Roscrea Blues	Tipperary	21 July 1779	Blue, faced blue; gold lace	Colonel L. Parsons
Liberty Volunteers		July 1779	Scarlet, faced pea green	Colonel Sir Edward Newenham*; Captain Edward Newenham
Liberty Artillery				Captain James Napper Tandy
Borris in Ossery Rangers	Queen's County	1 August 1779	Scarlet, faced black; silver epaulettes	Captain commandant James Stephens*; Lieutenants Erasmus Burrowes; Ensign Walter Stephens
Kile Volunteers		1 August 1779	Scarlet, faced blue; silver lace	Colonel Charles White*
Glenboy and Killemat Regiment		1 August 1779	Scarlet, faced blue; silver lace	Colonel Cullen*
Ross Union Rangers		1 August 1779	Scarlet, faced green	Colonel Drake
Mountain Rangers		15 August 1779	Scarlet, faced black	Colonel Bernard; Major George Clare; Captain John Drought
Eglish Rangers		29 August 1779	Scarlet, faced black; silver epaulettes	Major Thomas Berry; Captain John Drought; Lieutenant and adjutant J. Clarke
County of Dublin Light Dragoons	Dublin	August 1779	Scarlet, faced black	Captain Everard
Carrick-on-Shannon Infantry	Leitrim	August 1779	Scarlet, faced blue	Lieutenant-colonel Peyton
Dunmore Rangers	Galway	August 1779	Green, edged white	Colonel Sir Robert Staples
County of Carlow Legion	Carlow	1 September 1779	Scarlet, faced lemon colour	Colonel J. Rochfort*; Major Henry Bunbury
Carlow Association	Carlow	1 September 1779	Scarlet, faced black	Lieutenant and adjutant T. Proctor
Blue Battalion of the Ulster Regiment		3 September 1779	Blue, faced scarlet	Major Robert Burden; Lieutenant George Tandy
Rockingham Volunteers	Roscommon	7 September 1779	Blue, faced blue, edged scarlet; yellow buttons	Colonel Nixon*; Major Chamney
Arlington Light Cavalry		18 September 1779	Scarlet, faced green; yellow buttons	Captain George Gore*; Lieutenant John Warburton
Portarlington Infantry	Queen's County	18 September 1779	Scarlet, faced yellow; silver lace	Major commandant W. H. Legrand; Captains James Stannus, Henry Cary; Ensign Annesley Cary; Quarter-master J. Beuachant
Ross Volunteer Guards		20 September 1779	Scarlet, faced black	Captain Lieutenant H. T. Houghton
Clane Rangers	Kildare	September 1779	Scarlet, faced white	Captain Michael Aylmer*
Kilcullen Rangers	Kildare	September 1779	Scarlet, faced white	Captain Keating*
Athy Volunteers	Kildare	September 1779	Scarlet, faced white	Ebenezer Geale
Athy Independents	Kildare	September 1779	Scarlet, faced white	Captain Robert Jameson
Fartullagh Rangers	Westmeath	1 October 1779	Scarlet, faced blue	Nicholas Gay
Wexford Independent Volunteers	Wexford	4 October 1779	Scarlet, faced black	Captain and adjutant Miller Clifford; Sergeant Gird
Stradbally Volunteers	Queen's County	12 October 1779	Scarlet, faced blue; silver lace	Colonel Thomas Cosby
Willsborough Volunteers	Tipperary	October 1779	Dark green, edged white	Colonel Thomas Wills; Major Owen Young
Upper Cross and Coolock	Dublin	October 1779	Scarlet, faced green	Denis Lawler
Kells Association		1 November 1779	Scarlet, faced green	Lieutenant-colonel Benjamin Morris
Waterford Union	Waterford	6 November 1779	Scarlet, faced green	Surgeon Samuel Lamphire
Strokestown Light Horse	Roscommon	November 1779	Scarlet, faced yellow	Major Gilbert Conry
Naas Rangers	Kildare	10 December 1779	Scarlet, faced white	Captain commandant R. Neville*
Killivan Volunteers	Monaghan	25 December 1779	Scarlet, faced green	Major William Smith
Rafoord Brigade (Light Cavalry)	Galway	26 December 1779	Scarlet, edged blue; gold lace	Colonel Denns Daly
Edgeworthstown Battalion	Longford	1779	Blue, faced scarlet	Colonel Sir W. G. Newcomen*
Lowtherstown and Ballinamallard Volunteers	Fermanagh	1779	Scarlet, faced black	Colonel William Irvine
Longford Light Horse	Longford	1779	Buff, faced black	Colonel H. Nisbit*
Ballyleek Rangers	Monaghan	1779	Scarlet, faced white gold lace	Colonel John Montgomery*
Kilcooly True Blues		1779	Blue, faced white	Colonel Sir William Barker*
Borris Volunteers	Carlow	1779	Scarlet, faced black	Colonel Kavanagh
Monaghan Rangers	Monaghan	10 January 1780	Scarlet, faced white	Colonel William Forster
Leap Independents		17 March 1780	Blue, faced blue; edged white	Colonel Jonathan Darby*
Independent Dublin Volunteers	Dublin	24 April 1780	Scarlet, faced dark green; gold lace hats	Colonel William Thomas Smyth; Major Samuel Canier; Captain Collins; Ensign Paul Ham
1st Tyrone Regiment	Tyrone	July 1780	Scarlet, faced deep blue	Colonel James Stewart*; Lieutenant-colonel Charlton
Union Light Dragoons (City of Dublin)	Dublin	12 September 1780	Scarlet, faced green	Captain commandant R. Cornwall*; Lieutenant J. Talbot Ashenburst*
Talbotstown Invincibles	Wicklow	December 1780	Scarlet, faced deep green	Colonel N. Westby*; Major John Smith; Lieutenant F. W. Greene
Glorious Memory Battalion		1780	Scarlet, faced grass green	Colonel T. Morris Jones*
Cork Independent Artillery	Cork	17 March 1781	Blue, faced scarlet; gold lace	Colonel Richard Hare
Belfast Light Dragoons	Antrim	26 March 1781	Scarlet, faced green; silver lace	Captain Burden
Builders' Corps		4 November 1781	Blue, faced blue; edged scarlet	Colonel Read
Society Volunteers of Derry	Londonderry	17 March 1782	Scarlet, faced blue	Captain William Moore
Granard Infantry, Union Brigade	Longford	1 May 1782	Scarlet, faced blue	Captain J. E. Hamilton
Irish Brigade		5 June 1782	Scarlet, faced grass green; silver lace	Captain Charles Abbott
Clanricarde Brigade	Galway	June 1782	Scarlet, faced blue	Major Darcy*
Aghavoe Loyals	Queen's County	1 July 1782	Scarlet, faced blue	Captain Robert White
Rathangan Union	Kildare or Wexford	2 August 1782	Scarlet, faced white	Captain William Montgomery
Fingal Light Dragoons	Dublin	27 June 1783	Scarlet, faced white	Captain Thomas Baker
Tully Ash Real Volunteers	Down	15 October 1783	Scarlet, faced black; silver lace	Colonel T. Dawson Laurence; Captain A. Dawson Laurence
Aughnacloy Battalion	Tyrone		Scarlet, faced white	Colonel P Alexander
Ashfield Volunteers	Cavan		Blue, faced white	Captain H. Clements*
Arran Phalanx			Scarlet, faced white	Lieutenant Frederick Fore
Constitution Regiment (County Down)	Down		Scarlet, faced yellow	Captains Ford, Gawin Hamilton*
Dundalk Horse	Louth		Scarlet, faced green	J. W. Foster*
Dromore Volunteers	Kerry		Scarlet, faced green	Colonel John Mahony
Imokilly Horse	County Cork		White, edged scarlet	Colonel Roche
1st Independent Down Regiment	Down		Blue, faced orange	Lieutenant-colonel Stewart
Independent Enniskilliners	Fermanagh		Scarlet, faced black	Captain James Armstrong
Limerick Cavalry	Limerick		Scarlet, faced blue; silver lace	James Sexton
Mitchelstown Dragoons	Cork		Scarlet, faced black	Colonel Lord Kingsborough
1st Ulster Regiment			Scarlet, faced white	Colonel Earl of Charlemont*; Lieutenant-colonels Sir W. Synnot*, Right Honurable William Brownlow*, C. McCausland; Captain G. W. Molyneux
2nd Ulster Regiment				
3rd Ulster Regiment				Lieutenant-colonel William Ross
4th Ulster Regiment			Scarlet, faced blue	Colonel R. MacClintock
Ralphsdale Light Dragoons	Westmeath		Scarlet, faced yellow	Captain John Tandy
Ulster Regiment Artillery			Blue, faced scarlet	Captain Thomas Ward
Union Light Dragoons (County Meath)	Meath		Scarlet, faced green	Captain G. Lucas Nugent
1st Down Regiment (2 battalions)	Down			Colonel Stewart*
Glendermot Battalion	Londonderry			Colonel George Ash
Lecale Battlation (County Down)	Down			Lieutenant Charles Macarthy
Muskerry True Blue Light Dragoons	Cork			Lieutenant-colonel R. Hutchinson
Skreen Corps				Lord Killeen
Carbery Independents				Lieutenant Amyas Griffith
Coolock Corps	Dublin			

== Miscellaneous Ulster companies ==
The following Volunteer companies are from the province of Ulster:

- Coagh Volunteers
- Killead Artillery
- Aghadee Artillery
- Belfast Horse
- Newry Horse
- Newton Horse
- O'Neills Horse
- First Holywood
- Carrickfergus Company; founded 3 April 1779; uniform: scarlet, faced pea green; Captain Marriot Dalway; Captain-lieutenant Rice
- Killileagh
- Lisburn First Company
- Rosevale
- Ballynahinch
- Moira Volunteers; Colonel William Sharman
- Loughbriclan Loyalists; Captain Finvey; Captain Hugh Trevor
- 1st Magherafelt Volunteers; founded: June 1773; uniform: scarlet, faced black; Captain A. Tracy; Lieutenant Richard Dawson; Ensign R. Montgomery
- The Inch Infantry, County Down
- Castle-Ward Fusileers, County Down
- Down Volunteers, County Down
- Loyal Ballyleidy Infantry, County Down
- Protestant Boys, Down, County Down
- Saintfield Infantry, County Down; Captain Nicholas Price
- Larne Infantry

== Miscellaneous battalions ==
=== Belfast Battalion ===
The following companies are listed as having attended the Belfast Review in 1782. The battalion itself was raised in April 1779, with uniforms meant to be scarlet faced with black. Two principal members were Colonel Stewart Banks and Major Brown.

- Belfast First Volunteer Company; founded 17 March 1778; uniform: scarlet, faced black; Captain Waddal Cunningham
- Belfast Artillery
- Belfast Union; founded 12 June 1778; uniform: scarlet, faced blue; Captain Lyons
- Donegore
- Holywood
- Larne Independents; founded April 1782; uniform: scarlet, faced blue; Captain White
- Whitehouse

=== Coleraine Battalion ===
The following is a list of Volunteer companies that form part of the Coleraine Battalion that attended the Ballymoney Convention of 1782. At the convention, the battalion was represented by Colonel John Richardson.

- Coleraine Company; Captain Lyle
- Ballywillen; Captain Cromie
- Balrashane; Major Lyle
- Dumboe; Captain Haslett
- Garvagh; Lieutenant-colonel Canning
- Macaskey; Colonel Richardson
- Parish of Coleraine; Captain Gault

=== Dromore Battalion ===
The following are Volunteer companies that attended the Rathfrilan Review of 19 October 1792.

First Brigade

Represented by Colonel Lord Annesley, and Lieutenant-colonel William Annesley. The companies listed as part of this brigade are all listed as having scarlet uniforms.

- Grenadier Company; Captain Magennis
- 1st Battalion Company; Captain Hodges
- 2nd Ballyroney; Captain Boyd
- 3rd Banbridge; Captain Law
- 4th Banbridge; Captain Fearis
- 5th Banbridge; Captain Archibald
- 6th Banbridge; Captain Keowen
- 7th Paxton Rangers; Captain Paxton
- 8th Inchigo; Captain Annesley
- Light Infantry; Captain Maitland
- Gransha; Captain Dick
- Rathfrilan Volunteers; Captain Lindsay, Lieutenant John McBride
- Rathfrilan Infantry; Captain Lindsay

Second Brigade

Represented by Colonel Vaughan.

- Anaghlone; uniform: blue; Captain Paxton
- Ballyroney 1st Company; uniform: red; Captain Lowry
- Dromore Grenadiers; uniform: red; Captain Campbell
- Donaghmore Volunteers; uniform: blue; Captain Carswell
- Dromore Volunteers; uniform: red; Captain McComb
- Dromore Intrepids; uniform: red; Captain Scott
- Dromore Independents; uniform: green; Captain McKey
- Dromore Union; uniform: blue; Captain Heyland
- Glenville; uniform: blue; Captain A. Scott
- Knockmagorm; uniform: blue; Captain McMinn
- Villa Independents; uniform: blue; Captain Hamilton
- Waringsford 1st Division; uniform: blue; Captain Cowan
- Waringsford 2nd Division; uniform: blue; Captain Brush

The following two companies were not in uniform, with two non-uniformed companies noted as not being not in attendance:

- Lordship Liberty Volunteers; led by Captain Scott
- Grena Volunteers; led by Captain Swan

=== Glorious Memory Battalion ===
The following are recorded as attending the Ballymoney Convention of 1782. At it they were represented by Colonel Thomas Morris Jones.

- Armoy; Captain Clark
- Ballygarvey; Captain Campbell
- Ballycastle; Captain Boyd
- Ballymena; Captain-lieutenant Hops
- Ballymoney Volunteers; Captain Leslie
- Clogh; Captain Douglas
- Dervock Volunteers; Captain Moore
- Grenadier Company; Captain Dick
- Kilroghts; Captain Allen (also captain of Loghgeel and Springmount)
- Light Infantry; Captain Rogers
- Loghgeel; Captain Allen (also captain of Kilroghts and Springmount)
- Portglenone Rangers; Captain Simpson
- Moneyglass; Captain-lieutenant Brady
- Resharkin; Captain-Lieutenant Boyd
- Royal Larne Volunteers; Captain-lieutenant Shaw
- Springmount; Captain Allen (also captain of Kilroghts and Loghgeel)

== Down Regiment ==
The following companies are listed as being cantoned in Belfast and forming a garrison during the Belfast Review of 1782. At it they were represented by Colonel Stewart.

- Bangor Volunteers
- Comber Company; led by Orrs, Gillespy, and Andrews
- Donaghadee
- Dundonald
- Newton 1st
- Newton 2nd
- Newton 3rd
- Newton Artillery

== Ulster Regiment ==
At the Belfast Review on 1782, the Ulster Regiment is noted as being divided into two battalions: the Blue Battalion; and the Red Battalion. The following companies are those listed as attending the Belfast Review of 1782. The Blue Battalion was represented by Colonel Rowley.

=== Blue Battalion ===
- Lisburn True Blue Grenadiers
- Lisburn Battalion Company Grenadiers
- Lisburn Light Company Grenadiers
- Lambeg
- Dromore
- Maghregell
- Ulster Light Artillery

=== Red Battalion ===
- Ballylesson
- Ballynure
- Drumbridge
- Dunmurry
- Purdisburne
- Lisburn Fusileers; uniform: scarlet, faced blue; Lieutenant John Kenby

== 1st Royal Ulster Regiment ==
The 1st Royal Ulster Regiment (County of Antrim) was commanded at the Belfast Review on 1782 by Colonel O'Neill. Major A. MacManus is also noted as a leader in the regiment. MacManus was requested to act as exercising officer of the Glorious Memory Battalion. Their uniforms are detailed as being scarlet, faced blue with gold lace. The following companies are listed as having attended the Belfast Review 1782.

- Ahoghill
- Antrim
- Braid
- Broughshane
- Connor
- Cullbackey
- Portglenone
- Randalstown

== First Ulster Regiment ==
The Volunteers of County Armagh formed the First Ulster Regiment, also known as the Armagh Regiment of Volunteers. This regiment contained two battalions: the Northern Battalion; and the Southern Battalion.

Name	Battalion	Date associated	Uniform	
Armagh First Company				
Drumbanagher Volunteers		1779		Captain John Moore
Edenknappagh Volunteers			Green, with white edging	Captain George or William Murray
First Newry				
Hockley Volunteers		1779		Captain Arthur Graham
Keady Volunteers		1780	Blue, with white edging	Captain James Black
Knappagh		c1788	Red, faced blue	Captain James Johnston
Lisdrumchor Volunteers	Southern Battalion	c1779	No particulars	Captain John Ingram
Lislooney Volunteers	Southern Battalion	1779	No particulars	Reverend George Harris
Loughgall Volunteers	Northern Battalion	1779	Scarlet, faced white	Captain John Blackhall
Loughgall and Charlemont Union Volunteers	Northern Battalion		Scarlet and white	
Lurgan Volunteers	Northern Battalion	c1779	Scarlet, faced white	Captain William Brownlow; Lieutenants Thomas Druitt, Godfrey
Maghernahely Volunteers		c1779		Captain John Moore
Markethill Volunteers	Southern Battalion			
Mountnorris	Southern Battalion	1779	Scarlet and white	Captain John Cope; Lieutenant Torrington
Newry Fencibles (Newry Third Volunteer Company)	Southern Battalion	1779		Captain David Bell
Newtownhamilton Volunteers (Tullyvallen Volunteers)		c1780	Captain Edward Tipping	No particulars
First Orior Volunteers (possibly also known as Orior Light Infantry)	Southern Battalion	1779	Scarlet, faced green	Captain Francis Evans
Second Orior Volunteers (also known as Orior Battalion Company)	Southern Battalion	1779	No particulars	Captain James Dawson; Captain James Wright
Orior Grenadiers	Southern Battalion	13 September 1779	Scarlet, faced black	Captain James Dawson*
Portadown Volunteers	Northern Battalion	1779	Scarlet, faced white	Captain Hamlet Obins
Sheepbridge				
Richhill Volunteers	Northern Battalion	1779	Scarlet, faced white	Captain William Richardson
Tanderagee Volunteers	Southern Battalion	1779	Scarlet, faced white	Captain Nicholas Johnston
Tanderagee Invincibles (Tanderagee Second Company)	Southern Battalion	1779	Scarlet, faced white	Captain Nicholas Johnston
Tanderagee Light Dragoons	Southern Battalion	c1780/81		Captain James Craig
Tassagh Volunteers	Southern Battalion	1781	No particulars	Captain Reverend William Henry
Teemore and Johnston Volunteers (Marlacoo Volunteers)	Northern Battalion	1779	Scarlet, white facings	Captain Benjamin Bell
Tullyhappy Volunteers				
Tyrone's Ditch and Acton Volunteers		1779	Scarlet, faced white	Captain Francis Dobbs
