= Horace Dobbs =

British scientist, researcher, author, and television producer (1933–2020)

Dr Horace Edward Dobbs
- Born: 14 January 1933; London, England
- Died: 12 July 2020 (aged 87)
- Education: John Ruskin School in Croydon, England, United Kingdom; London University (B.SC Chemistry); Oxford University (PhD)
- Occupations: British scientist, Researcher, Author
- Employer: United Kingdom Atomic Energy Authority
- Organization: International Dolphin Watch
- Known for: Oxford Sub Aqua Club; International Dolphin Watch; Ride a Wild Dolphin
- Notable work: Follow a Wild Dolphin
- Website: www.horacedobbs.com

Horace Edward Dobbs (14 January 1933 – 12 July 2020), and commonly referred to as Horace Dobbs /ˈhɒrɪs dɒbz/ was a British scientist, researcher, author, and television producer. He was regarded as an expert on dolphins and their behaviour. In 1978, Dobbs sets up the International Dolphin Watch. He also founded the Oxford Underwater Research Group.

== Early life ==
Born in London, Dobbs attended the John Ruskin School and graduated at the age of 16. After high school, Dobbs worked briefly as a laboratory assistant in the Burroughs Wellcome Research Laboratories Beckenham, Kent. (Note: Horace Edward Dobbs was part of the team that discovered etorphine, an opiate. This opiate was used to develop a veterinary drug called Immobilon, which is an analgesic used to sedate animals. The development of Immobilon revolutionised veterinary medicine and it is still used today to sedate large wild animals. Immobilon has been credited with saving animals a lot of distress when they need veterinary attention. This is because the animals do not need to be constrained. For example, when a stallion is being castrated or an elephant is receiving veterinary treatment, a dart injection of just 2–4 mg could knock it out. See Effect of Cyprenorphine by Dr. Horace Dobbs.) At the age of 20, Dobbs married his wife Wendy, and at 23, he graduated from London University with a BSc honours degree in Chemistry via part-time studies.

From the Burroughs Wellcome laboratories, Horace Dobbs moved over to the Atomic Energy Authority (UKAEA), where he wrote two research publications, Quenching and Adsorption in Liquid scintillation counting, in 1962, and Dispensing solutions for liquid scintillation counting, published in the scientific and technical Aerospace reports, Volume 3, issue 17 in April 1965. While at UKAEA, Dobbs obtained his PhD from Oxford University. During this time, he developed his passion for diving and also wrote his first book, Camera Underwater.

== Dolphin career ==
Dobbs started chronicling his studies and dolphin interactions with the airing of Neptune's Needle on the BBC One, on 24 June 1965 and 20 March 1966. A New York Times article on a dolphin named Fungie reported that Dr. Dobbs spent two years filming the dolphin.

Dobbs was considered an expert in subjects relating to dolphin behaviour, and in the Folkestone trial of two men accused of bothering a dolphin, Dobbs was called in as a defense witness. He was also interviewed by the BBC Radio Cornwall regarding the whereabouts and safety of a dolphin named Beaky of which he had written a book on titled, Follow a Wild Dolphin.

As a wildlife conservationist, Dobbs argued against keeping dolphins in captivity. In an article by the BBC, Dobbs was quoted as saying that keeping dolphins in captivity at resorts or aquatic parks is akin to torture.

As more and more people interact with dolphins, a growing number of experts, Dobbs included, believe that swimming with dolphins have a therapeutic effect on those suffering from depression. (Note: An account of how a mother of two used Dolphin Dreamtime to have pain free births is reported in DOLPHIN. Dec 2002, page 9.) A 1994 essay by Hon. David Lloyd Hoare narrated the story of how Dr. Dobbs took some persons to swim with a dolphin named Simo, and the therapeutic effect it had on one of them. (Note: Dr. Dobbs started a charity called Operation Sunshine Family Therapy Programmes. The charity offers children and young adults with severe physical and mental disadvantages the opportunity to fulfill their dream of swimming with dolphins in their natural environment, as well as giving the parents respite in a supportive and caring environment. The objective of the project is to enable the whole family to benefit from the activities on the programme to relax the body, relieve tensions, release of emotions, frustration, loss, fear, and anger. See Granta Article on the Dolphin of Amble. As part of the programme's data collection technique, participants are asked to complete questionnaires following the programme, and according to the charity, collated results have suggested that the programme stimulates the mind, increased confidence and self-esteem, aides concentration, and increases learning ability for those with cognitive or emotional disadvantage. The charity supports community projects pioneered in schools by Dr. Horace Dobbs with the concept of IDEAL (Integrated Dolphin Education and Learning).)

== Latter years and death ==
In his latter years, Dobbs moved away from factual writing and film-making to creating a series of fictional children's book about an orphaned Dolphin called Dilo. Although these books are fictional, the stories are all based on actual events that Dobbs had experienced with wild dolphins.

Dobbs lived in North Ferriby in the East Riding of Yorkshire, England, near the city of Hull. He was married to Wendy Dobbs (now in a care home). Dobbs had two children Melanie Parker and Ashley Dobbs, five grandchildren, and five great-grandchildren.

Dobbs died on 12 July 2020, at the age of 87.

== Filmography ==
- Horace Dobbs on BFI.
- Dobbs Goosen Films at BFI.

== Discography ==
- Horace E. Dobbs.
- Soundtrack to Wonders of the underwater world Dobbs Goosen Films.

== Award ==
- INTERNATIONAL-PLATFORM-ASSOCIATION-AWARDS.

== Scientific papers ==
- The Radioisotopes, from Nuclear Science Abstracts, Volume 18, Issues 1–7.
- Dispensing solutions for liquid scintillation counting. Published in NASA's scientific and technical Aerospace reports, Volume 3, issue 17. April 1965.
- Quenching and Adsorption in Liquid scintillation counting, August 1962.
- The detection of tritium labelled compounds in Vapour phase chromatography. Journal of Chromatography A, Volume 5, 1961.

== Horace Dobbs' books ==
List of books by Dr. Horace E. Dobbs.

- The Great Diving Adventure, (J.H. Haynes & Co. Limited).
- Underwater Swimming, (Collins Nutshell Books).
- Camera Underwater, (Focal Press).
- Follow a Wild Dolphin, (Souvenir Press).
- Save the Dolphins, with a foreword by HRH Prince Philip (Souvenir Press).
- The Magic of Dolphins, (Lutterworth Press).
- Tale of Two Dolphins, (Jonathan Cape).
- Dance to a Dolphins Song, (Jonathan Cape).
- Snorkelling and Skin Diving, with a foreword by HRH Prince Charles (Oxford illustrated Press)
- Classic Dives of the World, (Oxford illustrated Press).
- Journey into Dolphin Dreamtime, (Jonathan Cape).
- Dilo and the Call of the Deep, (Watch Publishing).
- Dilo Makes Friends, (Watch Publishing).
- Dolphin Healing, (Piatkus Books).
- Dilo and the Treasure Hunters, (Watch Publishing).
- Dilo in Lighthouse Bay, (Watch Publishing).
- Dilo and the Isle of the Gods, (Star Books).
- Dilo and the Mystery of Atlantis (awaiting publication)
