= Dobb-e Said =

Dobb-e Said دب سعيد
- Village
- Location within Iran
- Coordinates: 31°18′07″N 48°20′46″E
- Country: Iran
- Province: Khuzestan
- County: Ahvaz
- Bakhsh: Central
- Rural District: Esmailiyeh

Population (2006)
  - Total: 150
- Time zone: UTC+3:30 (IRST)
  - Summer (DST): UTC+4:30 (IRDT)

Dobb-e Said (Persian: دب سعيد, also Romanized as Dobb-e Sa‘īd; also known as Dūb-e Sa‘īd) is a village in Esmailiyeh Rural District, in the Central District of Ahvaz County, Khuzestan Province, Iran. At the 2006 census, its population was 150, in 22 families.
