= Date of Birth (band) =

Japanese pop rock/indietronica band

- Also known as: Percy Jackson
- Origin: Fukuoka, Fukuoka Prefecture, Japan
- Genres: Pop rock; indietronica; shibuya-kei; psychedelic pop; new wave; jungle
- Years active: 1982–2000; 2006
- Label: Kitty Records
- Past members: Norico; Isao Shigeto; Susumu Shigeto; Kenichi "Ken-1" Shigeto

Date of Birth (デイト・オブ・バース; abbreviated to DOB) was a Japanese pop rock/indietronica band formed in Fukuoka in 1985, consisting of Norico (vocals) and brothers Isao Shigeto (guitar, keyboard), Susumu Shigeto (drums, percussion), and Kenichi "Ken-1" Shigeto (music, visual direction). Originating from Mind Control, a Western-influenced new wave band formed in 1982, Date of Birth crossed over multiple genres, including psychedelic pop, Shibuya-kei, and jungle. The band had a 3D mascot created by Kenichi, Dob-kun, who starred in his own video game in 1999. Though Date of Birth was reasonably popular in Japan and parts of Europe in the 1990s, there has been no new activity from the band since their last compilation album in 2006.

== History ==
Mind Control was formed in 1982 by Isao, Susumu, and Norico. Inspired by American music of the 1960s and 1970s, Isao and Susumu had been making music for around a decade, and formed Mind Control after meeting Norico, who was introduced to them by a friend. Mind Control's 1983 songs "Red Enamel" and "Don't Break My Heart" attracted both foreign and domestic record labels. In 1985, Kenichi, a former punk rock singer working with computers in Mind Control's studio, decided to join the band, which became Date of Birth. That year, their first album Around+Around, distributed by Portrait Records, became their first international hit, being played in American nightclubs and on European radio stations. In 1986, Date of Birth signed with Kitty Records to release their debut single "Omoide no Hitomi".

Days of Dreams and Tears, Date of Birth's second album, was released in 1987. Their third album, Greatest Hits 1989–1999, was released in 1989; it was envisioned as a fictional artist's greatest hits album released ten years in the future, hence the title. In 1990, Date of Birth released Mind Control, an album that included unreleased songs from when the band was Mind Control. By now, Date of Birth was becoming more popular, holding their first concert at Club Quattro in Shibuya in May 1991 and performing live shows in other cities that summer, while also releasing After the Happy the same year. Around the same time, the Shigeto brothers, particularly Kenichi, became more interested and active in computer technology and CGI, helping create music videos starring Dob-kun. Starting in 1992, Date of Birth began to perform in concerts, tours, events, and television specials across Japan. Date of Birth released the albums Date of Birth and Welcome to Date of Birth World in 1992, Bless You All the Time in 1993, and their compilation album King of Waltz in 1994. Also in 1994, Date of Birth made the theme to Toho's 1994 film Godzilla vs. SpaceGodzilla, "Echoes of Love", and the band's members had cameo appearances in the film.

In 1995, Date of Birth launched their website after a lengthy break that began that spring, followed by the album La Lu La Roo (as well as its remix album Fa La Le Ra) that autumn, which began their shift into electronic music, although they still kept their pop rock style. In 1997, the band released the album Folk Songs, and began production of the video game Planet Dob, which was released in 1999 alongside the album Planet Dob, which had a completely new indietronica sound that had influences of lounge, drum and bass, and jungle.

After the release of Planet Dob, Date of Birth suddenly became inactive. It is unclear why, though the band's website notes that around this time Kenichi became increasingly active in video game development, while Isao began teaching at the Kyushu Institute of Design. The only new activity from Date of Birth since 2000 was the release of the compilation album Golden Best by Universal Music Japan in 2006, which featured three new songs.

== Planet Dob ==
Planet Dob
- Developer: MiCROViSiON Inc.
- Publisher: Hudson Soft
- Directors: Kenichi Shigeto; Toshiyuki Sasagawa; K-Suke
- Programmers: Akihiko Yoshikawa; Minoru Aonuma; Tatsuji Matsumoto; Hiroaki Kawai; Takemi Otsuka; Toshiyuki Shimizu
- Artists: Kenichi Shigeto; Piston Grafix
- Composer: Date of Birth
- Platform: PlayStation
- Release: November 18, 1999
- Genre: Adventure
- Mode: Single-player

Planet Dob (alternatively Planet DOB) is a 1999 adventure video game developed by MiCROViSiON Inc. (now absorbed by Spike Chunsoft) and published by Hudson Soft for the PlayStation. It is named after Date of Birth's eponymous 1996 single, and was intended as a tie-in with their August 1999 album of the same name. The game was released on November 18, 1999, in Japan only.

Planet Dob follows the band's mascot Dob-kun, a cosmic sheriff and a fan of "Super Lounging Music" who is kidnapped by the mad scientist Dr. X, who sends the player to explore Dob-kun's mind and test his psyche. However, the CPU running the operation malfunctions, and the player, taking Dob-kun's form, must round up all 144 bits to repair the CPU. Included in the game is a "Mixing Hour" mode, which allows the player to listen to and remix the game's soundtrack and the songs from the Planet Dob album.

== In popular culture ==
Date of Birth's music was used for several Japanese films and television programs in the late 1980s and early 1990s, including Toho's 1986 film Tobira wo Akete ("Omoide no Hitomi"), TV Tokyo's fashion news program Fashion Tsushin ("Welcome to Neverland"), Nippon Television's Akujo ("Omoide no Hitomi") in 1992, Kyushu Asahi Broadcasting's Tenjin Manbou ("1969") also in 1992, TV Asahi's Otona ni shite ("Black Cat and Magician") in 1994, and Toho's 1994 film Godzilla vs. SpaceGodzilla ("Echoes of Love"), as well as several commercials. The band also created original music for Fuji Television's 1992 J-drama Anata Dake Mienai.

Date of Birth was featured in "Dob's Favorite", a Sega Saturn Magazine column written by Kenichi Shigeto from the October 1995 issue to the September 1996 issue.

== Discography ==
=== Singles and mini-albums ===
- "Omoide no Hitomi" (思い出の瞳) (1986)
- "You Are My Secret" (1992)
- "Omoide no Hitomi" (思い出の瞳) (1992) – featuring music used in Akujo and a Clearly Canadian commercial
- Colorful Date of Birth (カラフル・デイト・オブ・バース) (1994)
- The Psychedelic World of Date of Birth 1994 (デイト・オブ・バースのサイケデリックな世界1994) (1994)
- Nagisa no Date of Birth (渚のデイト・オブ・バース) (1994)
- Date of Birth in the Wilderness (荒野のデイト・オブ・バース) (1994)
- "Cookie Girl" (クッキーガール) (1994)
- "Echoes of Love" (1994)
- "Dob Meets Europe" (1996)
- "Crazy Jinx" (クレイジーなジンクス) (1997)

=== Albums ===
- Around+Around (1985)
- Days of Dreams and Tears (夢と涙の日々) (1987)
- Greatest Hits 1989–1999 (1989)
- Mind Control (1990) – later reissued with a slightly different track list
- After the Happy (アフター・ザ・ハッピー) (1991)
- Date of Birth (1992)
- Welcome to Date of Birth World (1992)
- Bless You All The Time (1993)
- King of Waltz (1994)
- La Lu La Roo (1995)
- Fa La Le Ra (1995)
- Folk Songs (1997)
- Planet Dob (1999)
- Golden Best (ゴールデン☆ベスト) (2006)

=== Various artists compilations ===
- Bettenchi (1986)
  - Tracks: "Around+Around", "King of Waltz"
- Les Enfants (1989)
  - Tracks: "Okay!"
- Shuji Terayama Tribute: In Search of the Lost Ball (寺山修司トリビュート 失われたボールを求めて) (1993)
  - Tracks: "Cowboy Pop"
- sushi 3003 (1997)
  - Tracks: "Aim at El Paso"
- sushi 4004 (1997)
  - Tracks: "Some Kinds of Love"

=== Other works ===
- Only You Can't See Original Soundtrack (あなただけ見えない music from JOCX-TV's mysterious psycho drama) (1992) – soundtrack album
- Planet Dob (プラネット・ドブ) (1999) – video game
