= Dob, Bhopal =

Dob
- village
- Location within Madhya Pradesh Location within India
- Coordinates: 23.3747598°N 77.5017428°E
- Country: India
- State: Madhya Pradesh
- District: Bhopal
- Tehsil: Huzur
- Elevation: 486 m (1,594 ft)

Population (2011)
  - Total: 1,162
- Time zone: UTC+5:30 (IST)
- ISO 3166 code: MP-IN
- 2011 census code: 482412

Dob is a village in the Bhopal district of Madhya Pradesh, India. It is located in the Huzur tehsil and the Phanda block.

== Demographics ==
According to the 2011 census of India, Dob has 250 households. The effective literacy rate (i.e. the literacy rate of population excluding children aged 6 and below) is 63.79%.

Demographics (2011 Census)
	Total	Male	Female
Population	1162	597	565
Children aged below 6 years	245	117	128
Scheduled caste	208	103	105
Scheduled tribe	14	7	7
Literates	585	340	245
Workers (all)	421	307	114
Main workers (total)	213	186	27
Main workers: Cultivators	70	68	2
Main workers: Agricultural labourers	12	10	2
Main workers: Household industry workers	6	6	0
Main workers: Other	125	102	23
Marginal workers (total)	208	121	87
Marginal workers: Cultivators	9	7	2
Marginal workers: Agricultural labourers	142	74	68
Marginal workers: Household industry workers	8	6	2
Marginal workers: Others	49	34	15
Non-workers	741	290	451
