= Nigel Dobbs =

English cricketer (born 1962)

Personal information
- Full name: Nigel Patrick Dobbs
- Born: 8 May 1962 (age 64); Scunthorpe, Lincolnshire, England
- Batting: Right-handed
- Role: Wicket-keeper

Domestic team information
- Years: Team
- 1986–1994: Lincolnshire

Career statistics
Competition	List A
Matches	3
Runs scored	3
Batting average	3.00
100s/50s	–/–
Top score	2
Balls bowled	–
Wickets	–
Bowling average	–
5 wickets in innings	–
10 wickets in match	–
Best bowling	–
Catches/stumpings	1/–
- Source: Cricinfo, 25 June 2011

Nigel Patrick Dobbs (born 8 May 1962) is a former English cricketer. Dobbs was a right-handed batsman who fielded as a wicket-keeper. He was born in Scunthorpe, Lincolnshire.

Dobbs made his debut for Lincolnshire in the 1986 Minor Counties Championship against Northumberland. Dobbs played Minor counties cricket for Lincolnshire from 1986 to 1994, which included 44 Minor Counties Championship matches and 13 MCCA Knockout Trophy matches. He made his List A debut against Lancashire in the 1988 NatWest Trophy. He played 2 further List A matches for Lincolnshire, against Nottinghamshire in the 1991 NatWest Trophy and Glamorgan in the 1994 NatWest Trophy. In his 3 matches, he scored just 3 runs.
