= Dobb-e Moleyhem =

Dobb-e Moleyhem دب مليحم
- Village
- Location within Iran
- Coordinates: 31°11′51″N 48°18′14″E
- Country: Iran
- Province: Khuzestan
- County: Ahvaz
- Bakhsh: Central
- Rural District: Esmailiyeh

Population (2006)
  - Total: 25
- Time zone: UTC+3:30 (IRST)
  - Summer (DST): UTC+4:30 (IRDT)

Dobb-e Moleyhem (Persian: دب مليحم, also Romanized as Dobb-e Moleyḩem; also known as Dobb-e Moleyḩīm, Domḩelem-e Mo‘alleh, Domleḩīm, and Domo Leḩeym) is a village in Esmailiyeh Rural District, in the Central District of Ahvaz County, Khuzestan Province, Iran. At the 2006 census, its population was 25, with 4 families.
