= Francis Dobbs =

Irish barrister, politician, and writer

Francis Dobbs (1750–1811) was an Irish barrister, politician and writer on political, religious and historical topics.

== Early life ==
He was second son of Richard Dobbs, Rector of Clougherny and Lisburn, and his wife Mary Young of Lisnane, and nephew of Arthur Dobbs, the governor of North Carolina. He was born on 27 April 1750, and took a degree at Trinity College, Dublin. He was in the 63rd Regiment of Foot for around five years, leaving in 1773.

Dobbs entered the Middle Temple in London in 1773; and was called to the Irish bar in 1775. In Dublin he took a leading part in social life, but was noted for growing eccentricity.

== Volunteer ==
Dobbs joined The Monks of the Screw, a political drinking club. Together with other members (John Forbes, Joseph Pollock, Charles Francis Sheridan), he visited Ulster at the end of 1779 and beginning of 1780, to gather support for patriotic and nationalist plans. Dobbs was a leading Volunteer and friend of James Caulfeild, 1st Earl of Charlemont.

In 1780 Lord George Gordon made himself unpopular in the Westminster Parliament, by reading out the pamphlet Dobbs had addressed to Lord North. The English reformer John Cartwright wrote to Dobbs the same year, seeking to have advice in case an English volunteer force could be raised. At this period of his life Dobbs was in correspondence also with John Jebb in England.

Dobbs was the representative of a northern volunteer corps at the Dungannon Convention in 1782. There he presented an ambitious plan of reform in Ireland, including a simplified liturgy. On the granting of the Constitution of 1782, at the prompting of Henry Grattan, Dobbs wrote in his History "it was on the plains of America that Ireland obtained her freedom", attributing the legislative powers now given to the Irish Parliament to the outcome of the American War of Independence.

Dobbs took a commission in a fencible regiment. In so doing he put himself in a minority in the Irish Volunteers, where the general opinion was that the fencibles were being recruited to undermine them. For that reason he was not allowed to attend the Dungannon Convention held in September 1783.

== In the Irish Parliament ==
Dobbs was completely opposed to legislative union with England, and believed it was impious. Caulfield and others leaders decided to make use of him, and in 1797 he was returned to the Irish House of Commons for the borough of Charlemont. The Irish Rebellion of 1798, in May and June of that year, left the government holding many prisoners. In the middle of July, on his own account, Samuel Neilson of the United Irishmen decided to come to terms; and Dobbs was brought in to mediate, on 22 July. He reported to Lord Castlereagh the following day. Castlereagh wanted to wait for the outcome of the trial of Oliver Bond, which was in progress. On the 27th Dobbs with sheriffs went round the prisons to try to get agreement for a settlement with the government. Despite an intervening execution, that of William Michael Byrne, agreement was reached on the 29th, saving Bond's life.

Dobbs delivered a parliamentary speech, and submitted five propositions for tranquillising the country, which were published in 1799. His major speech was delivered against the Union Bill on 7 June 1800; supporting a motion to postpone the third reading of the Bill, he commented on the current state of Europe, in the light of the Book of Daniel, to the effect that the Union would never be operative.

== Later life ==
With the passing of the Act of Union 1800. Dobbs sank into obscurity; he could not get any more of his books published, and his eccentricities increased to mental illness. He died in poverty on 11 April 1811.

== Works ==
In 1773 Dobbs's tragedy, The Patriot King, or the Irish Chief was played in Dublin. It was published in London in 1774, and besides the Smock Alley Theatre was put on in Rathfarnham and Belfast. Its theme was the defeat of a Viking invader by Irish forces.

Dobbs published political pamphlets during the Volunteer agitation:

- A Letter to Lord North, 1780;
- Thoughts on Volunteers, 1781;
- A History of Irish Affairs from 12 Oct 1779 to 15 Sep 1782, 1782; and
- Thoughts on the present Mode of Taxation in Great Britain, 1784.

Dobbs then published in 1787 four large volumes of a Universal History, commencing at the Creation and ending at the death of Christ, in letters from a father to his son, in which he tried to prove historically the exact fulfilment of the Messianic prophecies. He also published in 1788 a volume of poems, most of which had appeared in periodicals.

His major speech was published as Substance of a Speech delivered in the Irish House of Commons 7 June 1800, in which is predicted the second coming of the Messiah. It is said that 30,000 copies were immediately sold. He argued that the Union was forbidden by scripture, by quoting texts from Daniel and the Book of Revelation. He published in the same year his Concise View of the Great Predictions in the Sacred Writings, and his Summary of Universal History, in nine volumes. In 1803 Thomas Russell asked for a stay of execution, so he could work on Revelation and Dobbs's writings.

== Views ==
Known as "Millennium Dobbs", as an interpreter of Biblical prophecy he was a futurist. He placed Armageddon in Ireland. David V. Erdman wrote that Dobbs's interpretation of the Bible and history was Swedenborgian. It has been suggested that Dobbs might have been alluding to the prophecies of Joanna Southcott. The Monthly Review wrote of the first volume of Dobbs's Universal History that he stuck rigidly to the chronology of Isaac Newton. The Anti-Jacobin Review called his speech of 1800 "a species of fanaticism, which is highly discreditable to the cause of religion".

Richard Popkin compared Dobbs's religious views to those of Nathaniel Brassey Halhed; and contradicted the interpretation that his reading of the Book of Genesis was pre-Adamite or in line with Serpent Seed. A comment on Dobbs's View was in the Spirit of the English Magazines in 1821. It placed some names in a gathering of 30 people he mentioned there in Hoxton, with the bookseller J. Dennis and other Behmenists and followers of William Law. The group included John Bell "the Life Guardsman", a Wesleyan who had predicted the end of the world for 1757. (The description may mean though the renegade Methodist George Bell.) John Dennis published the New Jerusalem Magazine, and collected alchemical and mystical books; he (or his father of the same name) had a house in Hoxton Square, and was in business with James Lackington in the period 1778 to 1780.

== Family ==
Dobbs married Jane Stewart in 1773, and they had at least seven children. She was the daughter of Alexander Stewart of Ballintoy; and Dobbs moved onto Stewart property at Acton, County Armagh to manage it. His father-in-law, nicknamed "Graceless" for his extravagance, moved to Acton after losing the Ballintoy property where he had opened up the coastal coal trade.
