= Dobeš =

Dobeš (feminine: Dobešová) is a Czech surname. It was derived from the old Czech given names Dobeslav, Doběstoj, Dobrobud, etc., and also from the given name Tobiáš. Notable people with the surname include:

- Božena Dobešová (1914–1990), Czech gymnast
- Jakub Dobeš (born 2001), Czech ice hockey player
- Jana Dobešová (born 1968), Czech table tennis player
- Josef Dobeš (1904–1985), Czech equestrian
- Milan Dobeš (1929–2025), Czech graphical artist
- Roman Dobeš (born 1978), Czech footballer
