= Dobby =

Dobby may refer to:

== People ==
- Steve Dawson (born 1952), English bass guitarist nicknamed "Dobby"
- Dobby Dobson, Jamaican reggae singer and record producer Highland Ralph Dobson (1942–2020)
- Dobby Gibson (born 1970), American poet
- Doris Dobby Walker (1919–2009), American labor lawyer
- Anton Khudobin (born 1986), Kazakhstani-born Russian ice hockey goaltender nicknamed "Dobby"
- Dobby (musician), stage name of 21st century Filipino-Aboriginal Australian musician Rhyan Clapham

== Textiles ==
- Dobby loom, a mechanical device that simplifies the weaving of intricate patterns
  - Dobby (cloth), fabric made on the loom

== Other uses ==
- Dobby (Harry Potter), a character in the Harry Potter franchise
- Dobby, a character in the Peep Show TV series
- Dobby, a type of mischievous hobgoblin in English folklore

== See also ==
- Dobie (disambiguation)
- Dobbie, a surname of Scottish origin
- Dobbe, a surname of Dutch origin
