= Dobb (surname) =

Dobb is an English surname. Notable people with this surname include the following:

- James Dobb (born 1972), English motocross racer
- John Dobb (1901–1991), American baseball player
- Maurice Dobb (1900–1976), English economist
