= All Ireland Colleges Camogie Championship =

Camogie championship

- Irish: Craobhchomórtas na n-Íarbhun Scoileanna
- Founded: 1969
- Trophy: Corn Sceilge
- Title holders: Loreto Secondary School, Kilkenny (11th title)
- Most titles: Loreto Secondary School (Kilkenny) (11 titles)

The All-Ireland Colleges Camogie Championships are a range of Irish camogie tournaments played each year to determine the national champion secondary school or second level college at senior and junior level over a range of grades.

Since 1969 these competitions have been administered by the Secondary Education committee of the Camogie Association. The record holders in the Senior 'A' competition are Loreto Secondary School, Kilkenny The current holders of the cup are Loreto Secondary School Kilkenny having defeated Ursuline Thurles in the 2024 final.

== Graded competitions ==
There are graded competitions for colleges at three different levels. In the 2011 All-Ireland Senior B final Grennan College, Thomastown (4-10) defeated St Louis, Ballymena (3-3) in Trim. In the 2011 All-Ireland Senior C final Castlecomer Community School (Kilkenny) (4-2) defeated St Pius X College Magherafelt (2-5) in Trim, Co Meath.

== Trophy ==
The trophy for the Senior 'A' competition is the Corn Sceilge in honour of Seán Ó Ceallaigh (1872-1959) (known as Sceilg, an acronym of his name in Irish: Seán S. Ó Ceallaigh), one of the members of the Keating Branch of the Gaelic League that participated in the first Camogie matches in 1904.

== Participation levels ==
There are 300 secondary schools participating in camogie competitions throughout Ireland and the Women in Sport projects run since 2004 have helped increase the number of secondary schools playing camogie. Competitions are run on a provincial basis with provincial winners progressing to All-Ireland semi-finals and finals at both junior (1st – 3rd year) and senior (4th – 6th year) level.

== Background ==
Prior to the establishment of an All-Ireland competition in 1969, colleges competitions had been organised in Cork in 1914 and Dublin in 1919. Dublin and Cork colleges played an annual inter-city fixture. Dublin schools teams also participated in the Dublin league against club sides.

In the inaugural competition in 1969, Presentation Secondary School, Kilkenny defeated St Michael's, Lurgan by 5-0 to 2-2 in the first All-Ireland semi-final and in the final defeated St Aloysius, Cork, who had defeated St. Mary's, Tuam in the other semi-final. All-Ireland finals were held at Croke Park until 1981. The first midweek final took place in 1998 at The Ragg in Thurles, the first sportsfield to be designated exclusively for camogie fixtures. Eileen O'Brien from St Mary's, Charleville won nine All-Ireland colleges medals, one junior, four senior and four seven-a-side colleges medals. She scored 0-11 in the 1995 final when she was 14.

== Interprovincial ==
A colleges inter-provincial series has been played intermittently since 1979. The inaugural competition was won by Munster, defeating Connacht by 5-5 to 3-3 in the final with the help of a winning goal by Majella Hallinan.

== Senior 'A' roll of honour ==
School	Wins	Years won (no final 2021)
Loreto, Kilkenny	11	2010, 2011, 2012, 2013, 2017, 2018, 2020, 2023, 2024, 2025, 2026
St Raphael's, Loughrea	8	1985, 1986, 1987, 1988, 1989, 1990, 1991, 1992
St Mary's, Charleville	7	1996, 1997, 1998, 1999, 2001, 2002, 2006
Presentation, Kilkenny	4	1969, 1970, 1995, 2014
Presentation College, Athenry	4	1974, 1975, 1978, 2022
Coláiste Bríde, Enniscorthy	3	2003, 2004, 2005
St Brigid's College, Callan	3	1993, 2008, 2009
Scoil Mhuire, Cashel	2	1977, 1979
St Mary's, Nenagh	2	1994, 2000
Sacred Heart, Newry	1	1971
Presentation, Oranmore	1	1972
Presentation, Mountmellick	1	1973
St Aloysius, Cork	1	1976
North Presentation, Cork	1	1980
St Patrick's, Cork	1	1981
St Patrick's, Shannon	1	1982
St John Of God, Artane	1	1983
Maryfield College, Drumcondra	1	1984
St Mary's, Magherafelt	1	2007
Seamount College, Kinvara	1	2015
St Brigid's College, Loughrea	1	2016
St. Angela's Ursuline, Waterford	1	2019

== All-Ireland Senior 'A' Colleges Camogie finals ==
The first figure is the number of goals scored (equal to 3 points each) and the second total is the number of points scored, the figures are combined to determine the winner of a match in Gaelic Games

Year	Date	Winner	Score	Runner-up	Score	Venue	Captain
1969	Apr 19	Presentation, Kilkenny	3-02	St Aloysius, Cork	1-03	Croke Park	Mary Tallis
1970	Apr 18	Presentation, Kilkenny	2-03	Sacred Heart, Newry	1-01	Croke Park	Liz Neary
1971	Apr 3	Sacred Heart, Newry	2-04	Presentation, Mountmellick	3-01	Croke Park
Replay	May 1	Sacred Heart, Newry	3-02	Presentation, Mountmellick	2-01	Croke Park	Anne McCone
1972	Apr 29	Presentation, Oranmore	6-01	St. Louis, Kilkeel	4-01	Croke Park	Marie Murphy
1973		Presentation, Mountmellick	4-02	Presentation College, Athenry	1-02		Carmel Cottrell
1974	Apr 6	Presentation College, Athenry	3-01	St. Louis, Kilkeel	1-00	Croke Park	Midge Poniard
1975	Apr 19	Presentation College, Athenry	7-04	St Brigid's, Callan	2-04	Croke Park	Midge Poniard
1976	Apr 10	Presentation, Mountmellick	2-02	Presentation College, Athenry	0-02	Croke Park	Jacinta O’ Brien
1977	Apr 2	Scoil Mhuire, Cashel	2-02	Presentation College, Athenry	1-03	Croke Park	Cora Hennessy
1978	Apr 15	Presentation College, Athenry	2-03	Loreto, Coleraine	2-02	Croke Park	Anne Poniard
1979	Apr 7	Scoil Mhuire, Cashel	3-03	Presentation College, Athenry	1-03	Croke Park	Majella Hallinan
1980	Apr 19	North Presentation, Cork	4-07	Assumption, Walkinstown	1-01	Croke Park	Imelda Cronin
1981	Apr 4	St Patrick's, Cork	1-03	Assumption, Walkinstown	0-05	Cashel	Ann O’Mahony
1982	Apr 17	St Patrick's, Shannon	1-07	St Raphael's, Loughrea	1-04	Croke Park	Caroline O’ Meara
1983	Apr 16	St John Of God, Artane	2-06	St Patrick's, Cork	2-01	Belfield, Dublin	Adele Campbell
1984	Mar 24	Maryfield College, Drumcondra	2-05	North Presentation, Cork	0-05	Croke Park	Roisín Brady
1985	Mar 23	St Raphael's, Loughrea	4-07	St Patrick's, Cork	3-03	Cashel	Deidre Costello
1986	Apr 12	St Raphael's, Loughrea	2-04	FCJ Bunclody	3-01	Croke Park
Replay	Apr 19	St Raphael's, Loughrea	3-05	FCJ Bunclody	0-04	Rathdowney	Angela Cooney
1987	Apr 4	St Raphael's, Loughrea	3-08	St Mary's, Charleville	0-04	Cusack Park, Ennis	Bríd Stratford
1988	Apr 16	St Raphael's, Loughrea	2-13	FCJ Bunclody	1-05		Imelda Hobbins
1989	Apr 16	St Raphael's, Loughrea	5-09	St Patrick's, Keady	2-09	Donagh, Fermanagh	Tríona Dolphin
1990	Apr 7	St Raphael's, Loughrea	3-11	Scoil Mhuire, Cashel	2-00	O'Toole Park	Imelda Maher
1991	Apr 20	St Raphael's, Loughrea	3-06	Grennan College, Thomastown	0-00	Tullamore	Siobhán Keane
1992		St Raphael's, Loughrea	7-07	St Brigid's, Callan	2-04		Pamela Nevin
1993	Apr 3	St Brigid's, Callan	3-07	St Mary's, Charleville	1-02		Sinéad Millea
1994		St Mary's, Nenagh	1-10	St. Patrick's College, Maghera	1-02		Noelle Kennedy
1995	Apr 2	Presentation, Kilkenny	3-04	St Mary's, Charleville	2-04	Tullamore	Deirdre Phelan
1996		St Mary's, Charleville	4-08	St Raphael's, Gort	1-15		Deirdre Sheehan
1997	Apr 12	St Mary's, Charleville	1-15	St Brigid's, Loughrea	3-03	Tullamore	Vera Sheehan
1998		St Mary's, Charleville	1-11	Coláiste Bríde, Enniscorthy	1-04		Sinéad Callaghan
1999	Apr 17	St Mary's, Charleville	3-10	Coláiste Bríde, Enniscorthy	0-05	Nenagh	Caoimhe Harrington
2000		St Mary's, Nenagh	3-06	Seamount, Kinvara	0-07		Mary Rose Ryan
2001	Apr 28	St Mary's, Charleville	4-07	Loreto Secondary School, Kilkenny	0-03	Littleton	Niamh Bowles
2002		St Mary's, Charleville	4-16	Portumna Community School	1-09		Aine Kelleher
2003		Coláiste Bríde, Enniscorthy	5-07	St. Patrick's College, Maghera	0-03		Ciara O’ Connor
2004		Coláiste Bríde, Enniscorthy	0-08	St Mary's, Charleville	0-08
Replay		Coláiste Bríde, Enniscorthy	3-07	St Mary's, Charleville	2-04		Ursula Jacob
2005		Coláiste Bríde, Enniscorthy	1-08	St Mary's, Charleville	2-03		Bronagh Furlong
2006		St Mary's, Charleville	2-05	Presentation College, Athenry	2-05
Replay		St Mary's, Charleville	1-09	Presentation College, Athenry	0-04		Mary Coleman
2007		St Mary's, Magherafelt	0-11	Presentation College, Athenry	3-02
Replay		St Mary's, Charleville	2-09	Presentation College, Athenry	2-06		Michaela Convery
2008		St Brigid's, Callan	3-07	St Mary's, Charleville	0-05		Leanne Fennelly
2009		St Brigid's, Callan	1-11	Portumna Community School	1-06		Denise Gaule
2010	Mar 6	Loreto Secondary School, Kilkenny	2-05	Blackwater CS, Lismore	1-07	Ardfinnan	Aisling Dunphy
2011	Mar 12	Loreto Secondary School, Kilkenny	4-10	St. Patrick's College, Maghera	1-06	Trim	Aisling Curtis
2012	Mar 3	Loreto Secondary School, Kilkenny	4-11	St Brigid's, Loughrea	1-10	Templederry	Claire Phelan
2013	Mar 9	Loreto Secondary School, Kilkenny	1-11	St. Brigid's, Loughrea	1-06	Nenagh	Miriam Walsh
2014	Mar 8	Presentation, Kilkenny	2-09	St Mary's, Magherafelt	0-09	Parnells, Coolock
2015	March 7	Seamount College, Kinvara	1-05	St Flannan's Ennis	0-06	Gort	Siobhán Connolly
2016	March 5	St Brigid's College, Loughrea	2-06	Loreto Secondary School, Kilkenny	0-09	Nenagh	Tara Murphy
2017	March 11	Loreto Secondary School, Kilkenny	6-19	Ursuline SS, Thurles	1-04	Conahy	Niamh Deely
2018	March 10	Loreto Secondary School, Kilkenny	2-18	Cross & Passion College, Ballycastle	4-08	Darver	Ciara O'Shea
2019	March 23	St. Angela's Ursulines, Waterford	2-13 2-17 (R)	Cross & Passion, Ballycastle	2-13 2-11 (R)
2020	March	Loreto Secondary School, Kilkenny	1-15	Presentation College, Athenry	2-10	Banagher	Ciara O'Keeffe
2021		No competition
2022	5 March	Presentation College, Athenry	2-16	Cashel Community School	0-08
2023	18 February	Loreto Secondary School, Kilkenny	1-16	St. Patrick's College, Maghera	1-02	St. Peregrine's, Blanchardstown	Rachel Brennan
2024	24 February	Loreto Secondary School, Kilkenny	2-14	Ursuline SS, Thurles	2-06	Rathdowney
2025	15 February	Loreto Secondary School, Kilkenny	2-08	St. Patrick's College, Maghera	0-10
2026	21 February	Loreto Secondary School, Kilkenny	4-14	Ursuline SS, Thurles	0-09	Gortnahoe

== All-Ireland Senior B Colleges Camogie finals ==
Year	Date	Winner	Score	Runner-up	Score	Venue	Captain
1999	Apr 17	Sacred Heart, Clonakilty	3-13	Kilcormac Vocational	2-05	Nenagh	Geraldine Collins
2000		St Patrick's, Shannon	3-05	St Cuan's, Castleblakeney	1-00		Siobhán Kelly
2001		St Brigid's, Callan	2-05	Mercy, Woodford	1-04		Aoife Tracy
2002		Mercy, Waterford	2-08	Ard Scoil Mhuire, Ballinasloe	1-05		Mairéad Murphy
2003		Coachford College	1-05	Presentation College, Athenry	0-07		Joan Twomey
2004		St Rynagh's, Banagher	2-07	St Raphael's, Gort	0-07		Susan Earner
2005		Mercy, Woodford	2-06	Ursuline, Thurles	0-05		Phyllis Hayes
2006		St Fergal's, Rathdowney	2-09	St Patrick's, Keady	2-04		Eimear Delaney
2007		St Mary's Nenagh	3-06	Castlecomer Community School	1-08		Aoife McLoughney
2008		Christ the King, Cork	2-12	St Killian's, New Inn, Ballinasloe	3-06		Áine Moynihan
2009		Blackwater CS, Lismore	4-05	St MacNissi's Camlough Co Antrim	3-04		Jodie Walsh
2010	Mar 6	Coláiste Choilm, Ballincollig	3-09	Borris VEC	2-05	Cahir	Aisleen Sheehan
2011	Mar 12	Grennan College, Thomastown	4-09	St Louis, Ballymena	3-03	Trim	Shauna Carroll
2012	Mar 10	Coláiste Bríde, Enniscorthy	0-11	Coachford College	1-04	Bushy Park Dungarvan
2013	Mar 9	St. Mary's, New Ross	3-09	Laurel Hill, Limerick	2-09	Nenagh
2014	Mar 8	Our Lady's, Templemore	2-14	Calasantus, Oranmore	1-06	Nenagh
2015	March 7	Gorey Community College	2-06	Holy Rosary College, Galway	1-03	Monasterevin
2016	March 5	Scoil na Trionaide, Doon	4-10	St. Joseph's, Lucan	0-03	McDonagh Park, Nenagh
2017	March 21	St. Joseph's Rochfortbridge	2-06	Coláiste Íosagáin, Dublin	0-03	Donaghmore/Ashbourne
2018	March 20	St. Angela's Ursulines, Waterford	5-14	Coláiste Íosagáin, Dublin	3-14
2019	March 2	Castlecomer Community School	2-06	St. Mary's, Nenmgh	0-07
2020
2021	No Competition
2022		Colaiste Bride, Carnew		Colaiste Mhuire, Ennis
2023		St. Louis, Ballymena		Gorey CS
2024	February 24	St. Raphael's, Loughrea	3-06	St. Mary's, New Ross	1-09	Borrisoleigh
2025	February 15	Colaiste Johnstown	2-10	Mercy College, Roscommon	2-07	Banagher
2026	February 26	Scoil Mhuire Greenhill, Carrick-on-Suir	3-04 0-13 (R)	Presentation Wexford	0-13 2-04 (R)	SETU Carlow	Amy Lynch & Ava Sutton

== All-Ireland Senior C Colleges Camogie finals ==
Year	Date	Winner	Score	Runner-up	Score	Venue	Captain
2006		Coláiste Choilm, Ballincollig	1-06	Gort Community School	1-02		Maria O’ Donoghue
2007		Scoil Mhuire Greenhill, Carrick-on-Suir	4-09	St. Brendan's, Birr	1-04		Lisa Phelan
2008		Blackwater CS, Lismore	3-03	Sacred Heart, Tullamore	1-05		Sandra Prendergast
2009		St Colm's High School, Draperstown	1-09	Grennan College, Thomastown	0-11		Jodie Walsh
2010	Mar 6	Presentation, Thurles	3-18	Banagher College	1-03	Toomevara	Eithne Moran
2011	Mar 12	Castlecomer CS	4-02	St Pius X College Magherafelt	2-05	Trim	Orlaith Walsh
2012	Mar 24	Kinsale CS	3-06	St Mary's Midleton	2-04	Camogie Grounds Cork
2013	Mar 9	Roscrea Community College	2-06	Colaiste na Sionna, Banagher	1-08	Birr
2014		Scoil na Trionoide Naofa, Doon	0-08 2-09 (R)	Maryfield College	0-08 2-07 (R)
2015	March 7	St. Dominic's College, Cabra	2-06	Sacred Heart, Clonakilty	1-06
2016	March 5	Mercy Convent, Roscommon	1-08	St. Joseph's, Rochfortbridge	1-07	McDonagh Park, Nenagh
2017		Castleknock Community College	2-07	St. Patrick's, Keady	0-04
2018	March 13	John the Baptist, Hospital	2-17	Loreto, Mullingar	2-10
2019	March 2	Cashel Community School	6-10	St. Pius, Derry	0-01
2020		St. Cuan's, Draperstown		St. Cuan's, Ballinasloe
2021		No Competition
2022		St.Killian's, New Inn		Coliaste Phobal, Roscrea
2023	Feb 25	Colaiste Abhainn Ri, Callan	2-09	Gort C.S.	2-07	Rathdowney
2024	February 24	Mercy Convent, Roscommon	4-08	St. Mary's, Magherafelt	0-09	Ballyshannon
2025	February 15	Portumna Community School	1-11	Our Lady's, Templemore	0-08	Nenagh
2026		St. Cuan's, Castleblakeney	3-06	St. Mary's, Charleville	0-10

== All-Ireland Senior D Colleges Camogie finals ==
Year	Date	Winner	Score	Runner-up	Score	Venue	Captain
2011	Feb 26	St Declan's, Kilmacthomas	1-08	Mercy, Roscommon	0-08	Newcastle, Co Dublin	Niamh Rockett
2012	Mar 4	Coláiste Íosagáin, Dublin	3-08	St Mary's, Macroom	0-04	Templederry
2013	Mar 9	St. Joseph's, Tulla	2-16	Scoil Mhuire, Trim	3-07	Birr
2014	Mar 8	Glanmire CS	0-12	Dominican College, Dublin	0-11	Nenagh
2015	March 7	Colaiste Na Phiarsaigh, Glanmire	1-09	Loreto High School, Nenagh	1-07	Nenagh
2016		Our Lady of Lourdes, New Ross	3-07	St. Augustines's, Dungarvan	1-03	WIT, Carriganore
2017	March 14	John the Baptist CS, Hospital	3-10	Scoil Mhuire, Trim	1-08	St. Loman's, Trim
2018		Loreto, Fermoy	1-12	Colaiste Naomh Cormac	1-08	Conahy Shamrocks
2019	March 2	Colaite Mhuire, Ennis	2-08	St. Patrick's, Dungannon	1-06
2020
2021
2022
2023	February 20	St. Declan's, Kilmacthomas	1-10	Ardscoil Mhuire, Ballinasloe	2-04	Johnstown
2024	February 24	Our Lady's, Templemore	1-14	Our Lady of Lourdes, New Ross	0-09
2025	February 15	St. Mary's, Macroom	1-11	St. Conor's, Clady/Kilrea	1-07	Drumree
2026		Scoil Mhuire agus Íde Newcastlewest	1-16	Sacred Heart, Tullamaore	2-06

== All-Ireland Junior Colleges 'A' Camogie finals ==
Year	Date	Winner	Score	Runner-up	Score	Venue	Captain
1974	Apr 6	Presentation College, Athenry	3-00	North Presentation, Cork	0-00	Croke Park	Bernie Duffy
1975	Apr 19	Scoil Mhuire, Cashel	4-00	Presentation, Terenure	1-00	Croke Park	Midge Poniard
1976	Apr 10	Presentation College, Athenry	4-02	Sacred Heart (Christ the King), Cork	3-02	Croke Park	Ann Delaney
1977	Apr 2	Presentation College, Athenry	4-01	Sacred Heart (Christ the King), Cork	1-03	Croke Park	Anne Burke
1978	Apr 15	Scoil Mhuire, Cashel	2-03	Vocational Bawnboy	0-01	Croke Park	Eithne Bonnar
1979	Apr 7	Mercy, Roscommon	1-02	Scoil Pól, Kilfinane	0-01	Croke Park	Pauline O’ Connor
1980	Apr 19	Maryfield College, Drumcondra	2-03	De La Salle, Hospital	1-05	Croke Park	Siobhán Bryson
1981	Apr 11	St. John Of God, Artane	4-00	St. Patrick's, Cork	0-02	Nowlan Park	Michelle Sleator
1982	Apr 17	Maryfield College, Drumcondra	3-09	St. Raphael's, Loughrea	4-00	Croke Park	Carmel O’ Byrne
1983	Apr 16	Mercy, Roscommon	7-01	Coláiste Pól, Kilrea	1-03	Belfield	Elizabeth Lee
1984	Mar 24	St. Raphael's, Loughrea	6-08	St Patrick's, Shannon	2-01	Croke Park	Deidre Costello
1985	Mar 23	St. Raphael's, Loughrea	3-04	Coláiste Mhuire, Ennis	1-00	Cashel	Mary Dolphin
1986	Apr 12	St Mary's, Charleville	2-06	FCJ Bunclody	0-03	Croke Park	Angela Cooney
1987	Apr 4	St Mary's, Charleville	2-03	St. Raphael's, Loughrea	1-04	Cusack Park, Ennis	Máire O’ Sullivan
1988	Apr 16	St Raphael's, Loughrea	5-07	St Mary's, Macroom	1-00		Emer Hardiman
1989	Apr 15	St. Raphael's, Loughrea	5-00	St. Patrick's College, Maghera	0-02	Donagh (Fe)	Pamela Nevin
1990	Apr 7	St Brigid's, Callan	5-08	St. Patrick's College, Maghera	1-04	O'Toole Park	Sinéad Millea
1991	Apr 20	St Mary's Nenagh	3-09	St Cuan's, Castleblakeney	1-10	Tullamore	Áine Hogan
1992		St Mary's Nenagh	2-06	St Mary's, Magherafelt	0-08		Madeline Hayes
1993	Apr 3	FCJ Bunclody	2-07	St Mary's, Charleville	1-04		Katherine Kinsella
1994		St Mary's, Charleville	3-06	St Mary's, Magherafelt	1-05		Jean Cullinane
1995	Apr 2	St Mary's, Charleville	2-12	St Mary's, Magherafelt	1-01	Tullamore	Laura Leslie
1996		St Mary's, Magherafelt	1-10	F.C.J., Bunclody	0-4		Deirdre Sheehan?
1997	Apr 12?	Holy Rosary, Mountbellew	2-4	St Mary's, Charleville	1-05	Tullamore	Simone Forbes?
1998	Apr 8	Seamount, Kinvara	3-08	St Mary's, Magherafelt	1-02	The Ragg	Karen Huban
1999		St Mary's, Charleville	2-08	Seamount, Kinvara	0-05		Alison White
2000		Coláiste Bríde, Enniscorthy	3-05	Seamount, Kinvara	0-08		Caoimhe Fitzpatrick
2001		St Mary's, Charleville	7-16	St Mary's, Magherafelt	1-02		Marie Watson
2002		St Mary's, Charleville	4-10	Coláiste Bríde, Enniscorthy	4-08		Emer Watson
2003		St Mary's, Charleville	9-08	Portumna Community School	0-03		Sinéad McAuliffe
2004		Coláiste Bríde, Enniscorthy	8-06	Presentation College, Athenry	0-04		Úna Leacy
2005		Presentation College, Athenry	3-10	St Mary's, Magherafelt	2-3		Stephanie Dwyer
2006		St Mary's, Charleville	1-11	Portumna Community School	0-04		Aisling Thompson
2007		Loreto, Kilkenny	0-07	Presentation College, Athenry	0-05		Niamh Kelly
2008		Cross & Passion, Ballycastle	2-08	St Brigids, Loughrea	2-05	St Peregrines Dublin	Rebecca Walsh
2009		Loreto, Kilkenny	2-06	St. Patrick's College, Maghera	0-09		Grace Walsh
2010	Mar 20	Loreto, Kilkenny	1-16	St. Brigid's, Loughrea	2-07	Toomevara	Kate Holland
2011	Mar 12	Loreto, Kilkenny	3-11	St. Patrick's College, Maghera	0-07	Trim	Lydia Fitzpatrick
2012	Mar 10	Loreto, Kilkenny	2-07	Presentation, Kilkenny	3-04	Clara	Ciara Byrne
Replay	Mar 31	Loreto, Kilkenny	4-09	Presentation, Kilkenny	0-08	Clara	Ciara Byrne
2013	Mar 9	Loreto, Kilkenny	1-14	St. Brigid's, Loughrea	2-02	St. Brendan's Park, Birr	Kirsty Maher
2014	Mar 15	St. Brendan's, Birr	1-06	St Mary's, Charleville	2-02	Nenagh	Clodagh Mc Cormack
2015		Loreto, Kilkenny	3-11	Presentation College, Athenry	2-06	Monasterevin	Ella Moore
2016	Mar 19	Loreto, Kilkenny	3-07	Coachford College	1-10	Cahir	Caoimhe Dowling
2017	March 18	Loreto, Kilkenny	3-11	Cross & Passion, Ballycastle	2-09	Naomh Peregrine	Nicole Carter
2018		St. Angela's Ursuline, Waterford	1-09 1-05 (R)	St. Mary's, New Ross	3-03 0-07 (R)	Carriganore
2019	March 22	St. Brigid's, Loughrea	2-06	Loreto Secondary School, Kilkenny	2-05	Kilmallock
2020	March 8	Loreto Secondary School, Kilkenny	4-09	Presentation College, Athenry	2-12	St. Rynagh's	Emma Manogue
2021		No competition		No competition
2022	March 7	Ursuline, Thurles	7-07, 2-08 (R)	Loreto Secondary School, Kilkenny	6-10, 2-05 (R)	Johnstown
2023	March 22	Loreto Secondary School, Kilkenny	4-10	St. Patrick's College, Maghera	0-09	Louth GAA Centre of Excellence Darver	Ciara Dunne
2024		Colaiste Choilm, Ballincollig		St. Patrick's College, Maghera
2025	March 1	St. Patrick's College, Maghera	1-10	Presentation, Kilkenny	3-03	Castleblayney
2026	February 27	Loreto Secondary School, Kilkenny	3-11	Ursuline, Thurles	1-12	Conahy Shamrocks	Emma Hogan

== All-Ireland Junior B Colleges Camogie finals ==
Year	Date	Winner	Score	Runner-up	Score	Venue	Captain
1999		Coláiste Mhuire, Ennis	2-10	Loreto, Mullingar	1-02		Sharon O’ Loughlin
2000		Presentation, Kilkenny	2-06	Holy Rosary, Mountbellew	0-05		Marie O’ Connor
2001		Mercy, Woodford	4-09	St Patrick's, Keady	3-06		Ailbe Sheil
2002		Loreto, Fermoy	7-11	Ard Scoil Mhuire, Ballinasloe	2-07		Marie O’ Neill
2003		St Fergal's, Rathdowney	4-08	Holy Rosary, Mountbellew	3-05		Miriam Harrison
2004		Scariff Community College	5-02	Castlecomer CS	1-05		Marian O’Brien
2005		Coláiste Mhuire, Ennis	1-09	Borris Vocational	1-07		Erin Hennessy
2006		Borris Vocational	2-06	Gort Community School	0-04		Sinéad Kelly
2007		Coachford College	3-05	St Dominic's, Cabra	2-05		Michelle Healy
2008		St Mary's, Nenagh	5-06	Loreto, Wexford	0-04		Danielle Slattery
2009		St Joseph's, Borrisoleigh	5-07	St Patrick's, Keady	0-09		Moira Ryan
2010	Mar 20	St Flannan's Ennis	2-17	St Louis, Ballymena	2-03	Ratoath	Aisling D'Arcy
2011	Mar 12	Presentation, Thurles	3-06	Coachford College	2-05	Fermoy	Rosemarie Hanafin
2012	Feb 29	St Mary's, New Ross	5-08	Coláiste Dun Iascaigh, Cahir	3-08	Templederry
2013		Castlecomer Community School		Our Lady's, Templemore		Birr	Edel Coonan
2014	Mar 15	Coláiste Dun Iascaigh, Cahir	6-20	Calasanctius College, Oranmore	3-08	Nenagh
2015		St. Joseph's, Tulla	6-11	Seamount College, Kinvara	1-03	Athenry
2016	March 5	Coláiste Choilm, Ballincollig		Our Lady's, Terenure		McDonagh Park, Nenagh
2017	March 18	St. Angela's Ursulines, Waterford	3-16	Banagher College	1-04	St. Lactain's
2018	March 15	Presentation, Wexford	3-07 2-10 (R)	Castlecomer CS	2-10 1-11(R)	Tinryland
2019	March 2	Sacred Heart, Clonakilty	3-08	St. Mary's, Midleton	1-07
2020		Cashel CC		Colaiste Bhride, Carlow
2021	No Competition
2022		Presentation, Thurles		St. Brigid's, Callan
2023		Colaiste Mhuire, Ennis		Borris Vocational, Carlow
2024
2025	March 1	Portumna CS	1-11	St. Mary's Charleville	1-05	Nenagh
2026	February 28	Colaiste Mhuire, Johnstown	1-10	Colaiste Mhuire, Ennis	0-09	Banagher

== All-Ireland Junior C Colleges Camogie finals ==
Year	Date	Winner	Score	Runner-up	Score	Venue	Captain
2006		St Joseph's, Tulla	1-03	St. Patrick's College, Maghera	0-00		Kate Lynch
2007		Coláiste Choilm, Ballincollig	9-05	Muine Bheag Vocational	1-02		Breda O’ Callaghan
2008		St Mary's, New Ross	3-04	St MacNissi's Camlough Co Antrim	2-02		Mary Ellen Doyle
2009		Hazelwood, Dromcollogher	5-15	Coláiste Pól, Kilrea	0-00		Máire Flanagan
2010	Mar 20	Presentation, Thurles	4-08	Grennan College Thomastown	4-08	Nowlan Park
Replay	Mar 27	Presentation, Thurles	6-11	Grennan College Thomastown	1-03	Nowlan Park	Bernie Bergin
2011	Mar 12	Maryfield College, Drumcondra	2-08	Coláiste Dun Iascaigh, Cahir	1-07	Ellistown	Ashling Maher
2012	Mar 24	Seamount, Kinvara	1-08	Scoil Phobail Roscrea	2-01	Killimor	Megan Carr
2013	Mar 16	Laurel Hill, Limerick	3-08	Gorey Community School	2-04	Urlingford	Sinead McNamara
2014	Mar 14	St. Joseph's, Lucan	3-06	St. Joseph's, Tulla	2-07	Nenagh
2015		Coláiste Íosagáin, Stillorgan		Scoil na Trionoide, Doon
2016
2017	March 25	Borrisokane CS	3-09 2-08 (R)	Abbey Community College	3-09 2-04 (R)	St. Lactain's
2018	March 10	St. Mary's Midleton	3-17	St. Cuan's, Ballinasloe	2-09	Darver
2019	March 20	Cashel Community School	4-10	Portumna Community School	2-06
2020		St. Cuan's, Draperstown		St. Cuan's, Ballinasloe
2021		No competition
2022		St. Killian's Garron Tower		Seamont College, Kinvara
2023		St. Raphael's, Loughrea		Colaiste Naomh Cormac
2024		St. Mary's, Magherafelt		Kinsale CS
2025	March 1	Laurel Hill College, Limerick	2-11	St. Pius X College, Magherafelt	1-09	Kiltale
2026	February 28	Laurel Hill Secondary School, Limerick	7-09	St. Wolstan's, Celbridge	1-03	Johnstown

== All-Ireland Junior D Colleges Camogie finals ==
Year	Date	Winner	Score	Runner-up	Score	Venue	Captain
2011	March 26	Heywood CS, Ballinakill	2-06	Abbey CC, Ferrybank	2-02	Conahy	Noelle Murphy
2012	Mar 25	Mount Mercy College, Cork	5-09	St. Joseph's, Rochfortbridge	4-08	Templederry
2013	Mar 16	St. Joseph's, Tulla	4-13	Scoil Mhuire, Trim	0-05	Birr
2014	Mar 15	Mercy, Roscommon	5-09	Presentation, Waterford	1-05	Nenagh
2015		Our Lady of Mercy		St. MacDaras
2016
2017	March 21	John the Baptist CS, Hospital	3-07	Scoil Mhuire, Trim	2-06	Hospital
2018	March 10	Coláiste Phobail Roscrea	7-07	Clarin College Athenry	1-03	Darver
2019	March 2	Scoil Pól, Kilfinane	3-06	St Colm's High School, Draperstown, (Derry)	1-03
2020		Scoil Dun Iasaigh, Cahir		Loreto, Navan
2021		No competition
2022		Laurel Hill, Limerick		Ard Scoil Mhuire, Ballinasloe
2023
2024
2025	March 1	St. Dominic's, Belfast	2-07	Gaelcholaiste Chill Dara	1-09	Castleblayney
2026	February 28	St. Augustine's, Dungarvan	1-14	Scoil Mhuire, Clane	2-06	Dicksboro
