= 2011 All-Ireland Colleges Camogie Championship =

Camogie championship

All Ireland Colleges Championship 2011
Cup winners
- Winners: Loreto, Kilkenny (3rd title)
- Captain: Aisling Curtis

Runners-up
- Runners-up: St Patrick’s Maghera

The 2011 All-Ireland Colleges Camogie Championship was won by Loreto, Kilkenny, who defeated St Patrick's Maghera by 4–10 to 1–6 in the final on March 1, 2011.

== 2011 Final ==
Loreto College, Kilkenny
St Patrick’s, Maghera

LORETO KILKENNY:
GK	1	Kirsty Maher (Dicksboro)
RCB	2	Miriam Walsh (Tullaroan)
FB	3	Tracy Brennan (Lisdowney)
LCB	4	Sonya Buggy (Dicksboro)
RWB	5	Kate Holland (Lisdowney)
CB	6	Grace Walsh (Tullaroan)
LWB	7	Noelle Maher (Tullaroan)
MF	8	Niamh Byrne (Clara)
MF	9	Aisling Curtis (Clara) (captain) 0-2
RWF	10	Sarah-Anne Quinlan (Young Irelands, Gowran) 1-1
CF	11	Claire Phelan (Lisdowney) 2-3
LWF	12	Aoife Nolan (O'Loughlin Gaels)
RCF	13	Orla Hanrick (Dicksboro) 1-1
FF	14	Emma Comerford (Young Irelands, Gowran)
LCF	15	Aoife Murphy (Lisdowney)
Substitutes:
LWF		Lydia Fitzpatrick (St Lachtain's) for Nolan

St Patrick's Maghera
GK	1	Jolene Bradley
RCB	2	Maeve Quinn
FB	3	Aine McElwee
LCB	4	Rebecca Ferguson
RWB	5	Gráinne Ní Chatháin (O’Kane)
CB	6	Aoife Ní Chaiside
LWB	7	Dervla O’Neill
MF	8	Teresa McElroy 0-1
MF	9	Karen Kielt 0-2
RWF	10	Gráinne McNicholl (captain) 0-3 frees
CF	11	Caoimhe Moran
LWF	12	Shauna Quinn
RCF	13	Noleen McKenna
FF	14	Shannon Kearney 1-0
LCF	15	Mary Kelly
Substitutes:
RWB		Catherine McCloskey for Ní Chatháin
LWB		Danielle Quinn for O’Neill
RWB		Gráinne Ní Chatháin for McCloskey

MATCH RULES

- 60 minutes
- Extra Time if scores level
- Maximum of 5 substitutions

Preceded by 2010 All-Ireland Colleges Camogie Championship	All Ireland Colleges Camogie Championship; 1969 – present	Succeeded by 2012 All-Ireland Colleges Camogie Championship
