= Rebecca Ferguson (disambiguation) =

Rebecca Ferguson (born 1983) is a Swedish actress.

Rebecca Ferguson may also refer to:

- Rebecca Ferguson (singer) (born 1986), English singer-songwriter
- Rebecca Ferguson, camogie player in 2011 All-Ireland Colleges Camogie Championship

== See also ==
- Rebecca Ferguson Stone, character in the film, Parallel Lives
