= Granemore GFC =

Armagh-based Gaelic games club

- An Graínseach Mhór
- Founded: 1949
- County: Armagh
- Colours: White and Green
- Grounds: Pairc Mhuire
- Coordinates: 54.252°N 6.655°W

Playing kits
Standard colours

St Mary's Gaelic Football Club, Granemore, also known as Granemore GFC, is a Gaelic Athletic Association club located near the townland of Granemore, approximately seven miles south of Armagh in County Armagh, Northern Ireland. The club fields Gaelic football teams in competitions organised by Armagh GAA. As of 2023, Granemore's senior team was participating in the Armagh Senior Football Championship and the Division 1A League.

The club, along with neighbouring clubs representing Ballymacnab and Clady, is within the parish of Cill Chluana.

== History ==
While Gaelic football has been played in the Granemore area since 1884, Granemore GFC was established in 1949. In 1971, the club won its first Armagh Junior Football Championship, and won it again in 1990 and 1998. The Granemore senior team won the Armagh Intermediate Championship in 1991, and won it again in 2005 after defeating Whitecross in the final. In the early 2000s, Granemore's minor team won the mid-Armagh Championship. The club contested its first Armagh Senior Football Championship final in October 2022, losing out to Crossmaglen Rangers.

== Achievements ==
- Armagh Intermediate Football Championship (2): 1991, 2005
- Armagh Junior Football Championship (3): 1971, 1990, 1998
- Armagh Minor All County Football Championship (1): 2004
