= St Patrick's High School, Keady =

St Patrick's High School

Location
- Middletown Road; Keady, County Armagh, BT60 3TH; Northern Ireland; 54.252°N 6.712°W

Information
- Type: Secondary school
- Motto: Signum Fidei (Sign of Faith)
- Religious affiliation: Roman Catholic
- Established: 1970
- Founder: De La Salle Brothers
- Chairman: E Fearon
- Principal: Kelley McKenna
- Staff: 70 (approx.)
- Gender: Mixed
- Age range: 11-18
- Enrolment: 1,015 (approx.)
- Colours: Maroon and blue
- Slogan: Excellence every day for every child
- Website: www.stpatrickskeady.com

St Patrick's High School is a Roman Catholic non-selective, mixed secondary school in Keady, County Armagh, Northern Ireland that was founded in 1970 by the De La Salle Brothers.

== History ==
The school was founded in 1970 by the De La Salle Brothers to educate pupils from Derrynoose, Keady, Madden, Ballymacnab, Granemore, Clady, Darkley and Middletown, County Armagh. St Patrick's now also has students from Armagh and Monaghan. Upon opening the school had 450 pupils and 22 teachers which has now grown to an enrolment of 1015 pupils, which includes 240 Sixth Form pupils, and 70 Members of Staff.

In September 2000, St. Patrick's moved into a new purpose-built school with facilities including a 500 square metre sports hall, assembly hall, drama studio, lecture theatre, and oratory. The school has since been further enhanced with the completion of the Keady Recreation Centre. As part of this innovative ‘Dual Use Scheme’ with Armagh City and District Council (Armagh City, Banbridge and Craigavon Borough Council), the school now has a synthetic pitch with floodlighting, a pavilion with a meeting room, a grass pitch and a two floor fitness suite. The latest addition to the school was a sixth-form study centre.

== Staff ==
The first principal of the school was Brother Gerard Deegan who led the school for nine years. His successor was Brother Francis Manning, principal from 1979 to 1980.

Mr Patrick McAleavey OBE became principal in 1980, and was in the role until September 2010 when he retired. Having been a teacher in the school for ten years previously, Mr McAleavey was part of the school for a total of forty years. He was integral to promoting the school to one of the top five non-grammar secondary schools in Northern Ireland.

Pat McGuckian was appointed as new principal in April 2011. She was previously the vice-principal of St. Malachy's College, in Belfast. She resigned in April 2018. She was replaced by Dr Fionnuala Moore who had been Vice Principal of St Ronan's College, Lurgan. In February 2024 Kelley McKenna was appointed Principal, she had previously been Vice Principal at the school.

Senior Leadership Team

Principal -

- Mrs. K McKenna

Vice Principal -

- Mrs. G Lundy

Senior Teachers -

- Mr. C Furphy
- Mrs. G Doherty
- Mr. S McGeary
- Mrs. M Rafferty

== Academics ==
The school has been acknowledged as one of the top non-selective secondary schools in Northern Ireland for many years. In 2018, 91.3% of its entrants achieved five or more GCSEs at grades A* to C, including the core subjects English and Maths. Also in 2018, 66% of its entrants to the A-level exam achieved A*-C grades.

=== Key Stage 3 ===
Students at Key Stage 3 in St Patrick's are offered the following subjects in line with the Northern Ireland curriculum: English, Maths, Science, Religion, Geography, History, Irish, French, Spanish, Technology and Design, Art and Design, Physical Education (P.E.), I.C.T., Music, Drama, Home Economics, Citizenship and Employability, Careers Awareness and Personal Health and Social Education (PHSE).

=== Key Stage 4 ===
At GCSE level, all pupils must study the core subjects of English Language,English Literature,Mathematics,and Religious Education. Pupils may then choose 5 options from a number of subjects including: Double/Single Award Science (Biology, Chemistry and Physics), French, Irish, History, Geography, Home Economics, Music, Art and Design, Physical Education (P.E.), I.C.T., Technology and Design, Economics, Business Studies, Business Communication Systems, Motor Vehicle and Road User Studies (M.V.R.U.S.), Learning for Work and Life (LLW), Child Development, Construction, and Occupational Studies (VEP), Moving Image Arts, Hairdressing.

=== Sixth Form ===
At A-level, St Patrick's offers many of the subjects at Key Stage 4 alongside; Applied Business Studies, Double Award Applied Business Studies, Biology, Chemistry, Physics, Government & Politics, Travel and Tourism, Moving Image Art, Economics, Key Skills (Communication, Application of Number and I.C.T) and Certificate of Personal Effectiveness (C.O.P.E). Students may choose three or four A-Level and/or AS courses.

== Sports ==
St Patrick's has been active in the sporting field with all sports and from all age ranges, including;

- Football
- Athletics
- Gaelic Games - Gaelic, Hurling and Camogie
- Golf
- Netball
- Swimming
- Basketball
- Rugby

Sporting Achievements include:

- Ulster Senior Hurling Champions in 2011/2012, 2007/2008, 2005/2006, 2024 (Casement Cup)
- Ulster Senior Camogie Champions in 2011/2012
- All-Stars in camogie, hurling and athletics
- Under 14 camogie finalists in 2010/2011
- Third place in Cross Country in Ulster in 2012
- Year 8 Gaelic Football winners in 2010/2011 (McQuillan Cup)
- Irish News, sporting school of the year in 2010
- U14 Gaelic and U14 Camogie Teams were crowned "TEAM OF THE YEAR" of Armagh
- Ulster Year 9 Gaelic football winners in 2010/2011 (Corn Colmcille Cup)
- 2024/2025 Casment Cup, Markey Cup, Br Leopold & Fr Davies Champions
