= Johnswell =

Johnswell Tobar Eoin
- Village
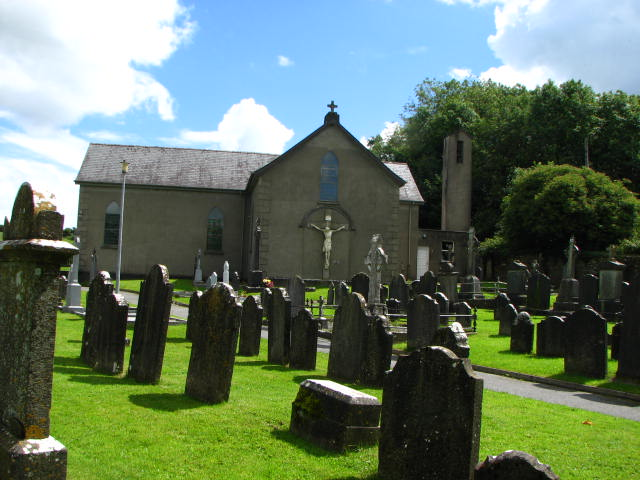
- Johnswell Church

- Location in Ireland
- Coordinates: 52°42′12″N 7°10′12″W
- Country: Ireland
- Province: Leinster
- County: County Kilkenny
- Time zone: UTC+0 (WET)
  - Summer (DST): UTC-1 (IST (WEST))
- Website: www.kilkennycoco.ie/eng/

Johnswell (Irish: Tobar Eoin) is a village in County Kilkenny, Ireland.

On the village green is a powerful spring and well dedicated to John the Baptist which was traditionally the venue for a local "pattern" (religious fair) of note, while the moat north of the village was the site of St John's Eve bonfires.

Maureen Hegarty (1 September 1921 – 14 January 2016), who was a local historian and president of the Kilkenny Archaeological Society, grew up there.

== Notable people ==
- Maureen Hegarty (1921–2016), local historian

== See also ==
- List of towns and villages in Ireland
