= Maureen Hegarty =

Irish historian (1921–2016)

- Born: 1 September 1921; Kilkenny, Ireland
- Died: 14 January 2016 (aged 94); Kilkenny, Ireland
- Education: University College Dublin

Maureen Hegarty (1 September 1921 – 14 January 2016), was an Irish local historian and president of the Kilkenny Archaeological Society.

== Biography ==
Maureen Hegarty was born to Denis and Mary Hegarty (née Gleeson), schoolteachers in Johnswell village in 1921. She was educated in Johnswell and the Presentation convent secondary school before she graduated with an arts degree in English and History from University College Dublin. After teaching in Newport in Wales during the Second World War, Hegarty returned to Ireland to teach, first in her own secondary school and then becoming vice principal of the Loreto Secondary School in Kilkenny City.

In 1952, Hegarty joined the Kilkenny Archaeological Society and was elected to the council in 1957. Hegarty was elected president of the society in 1988. She was a regular contributor to the Old Kilkenny Review and wrote a book on the foundation of the Presentation school in Kilkenny. Hegarty was involved in getting Rothe House, the historic city centre merchant's house, restored and set up to be used as the base of the Kilkenny Archaeological Society and a museum. Hegarty also founded the Annual Youth Heritage project which involved a competition for projects from school children. Hegarty was awarded an honorary master's degree from NUI Maynooth in 2007. She was also honoured during the Kilkenny People of the Year awards in 2013. She died in Kilkenny in 2016 and was buried in Foulkstown, County Kilkenny.

== Bibliography ==
- Isabella and Catherine and the Presentation Sisters of Kilkenny, 1995

=== Articles in the Old Kilkenny Review ===
- Johnswell, OKR 1956, p. 14ff.
- Clara Old Church and Freneystown Castle, OKR 1959, p. 55ff.
- "Johnswell, Cantwell's Court, & Kilderry", OKR, 1957
- Clara Castle, OKR 1959, p. 9ff.
- "Dr Richard Pococke, bishop - St Canice's and Lintown", OKR, 1963
- April 17, 1966 Opening of Rothe House, OKR 1967, p. 14ff.
- Jerpoint, OKR 1971, p. 4ff.
- French Visit in honour of St. Fiacre, OKR 1971, p. 41ff.
- Kilfane, OKR 1974, p. 7ff.
- Desart May 9, 1976, OKR 1977, p. 268ff.
- David Rothe, OKR 1979, p. 4ff.
- Medieval Stone Crucifixion at Johnswell, Co. Kilkenny, OKR 1983, p. 553ff.
- Fr Joseph Broughall, OKR 1986, p. 295ff.
- Dr Richard Pococke's Travels in Ireland, England and Wales, OKR 1987, p. 388ff.
- Rothe House Youth Project 1988, OKR 1988, p. 1534ff.
- Society Sees Paris Dressed Up for July, OKR 1989, p. 665ff.
- Thomas Pierce Purcell- A Kilkenny Man to be Remembered, OKR 2005, p. 89ff.
- Beginnings- The Early Years of The Kilkenny Archaeological Society, OKR 2008, p. 129ff
- I Must Be Talking To My Friends - Micheál Mac Liammóir in Rothe House, OKR 2010, p. 63ff.

== Publication ==
- Jerpoint, A Glorious Heritage (19 page pamphlet about Jerpoint Abbey)
