= Cian Kiely =

Irish Gaelic footballer

Personal information
- Native name: Cian Ó Cadhla (Irish)
- Born: 27 December 1996 (age 29) Cork, Ireland
- Occupation: Secondary school teacher
- Height: 6 ft 0 in (183 cm)

Sport
- Sport: Gaelic Football
- Position: Right wing-back
Club
- Years: Club
- 2014-present: Ballincollig
Club titles
- Cork titles: 1
College
- Years: College
- University College Cork
College titles
- Sigerson titles: 1
Inter-county
- Years: County
- 2018-present: Cork
Inter-county titles
- Munster titles: 0
- All-Irelands: 0
- NFL: 0
- All Stars: 0

Cian Kiely (born 27 December 1996) is an Irish Gaelic footballer who plays at club level with Ballincollig and at inter-county level with the Cork senior football team. He usually lines out as a defender.

== Career ==
Kiely first came to sporting prominence playing basketball. He won an All-Ireland U-14 title with his club and also played on Cork and Munster U-14 and U-15 squads. Kiely concentrated on Gaelic football after earning selection on the various Cork development squads at underage level. In 2014 he enjoyed a hugely successful year, winning Munster and All-Ireland titles with Coláiste Choilm, playing for the Cork minor football team, and lining out on the Ballincollig club team that won their first ever Cork SFC title. Kiely's inter-county progression continued and he came on as a substitute when Cork were beaten by Mayo in the 2016 All-Ireland under-21 final. He joined the Cork senior football team in 2018. Kiely also captained University College Cork to the Sigerson Cup title in 2019.

== Honours ==
Coláiste Choilm

- All-Ireland Post-Primary Schools Senior B Football Championship: 2014
- Munster Post-Primary Schools Senior B Football Championship: 2014

University College Cork

- Sigerson Cup: 2019 (c)

Ballincollig

- Cork Senior Football Championship: 2014

Cork

- Munster Under-21 Football Championship: 2016
