= 2012 All-Ireland Colleges Camogie Championship =

Camogie championship

All Ireland Colleges Championship 2012
Winners
- Champions: Loreto, Kilkenny (4th title)
- Captain: Claire Phelan

Runners-up
- Runners-up: St Brigid's, Loughrea
- Captain: Aoibhin Kenny

The 2012 All Ireland Colleges Camogie Championship was won by Loreto, Kilkenny, who defeated St Brigids Loughrea by 4–11 to 1–10 in the final on March 3, 2012, at Templederry. It completed a three-in-a-row by the school, who also captured the junior title that year. They had10 of the 2011 winning team on their starting 15. Tracey Brennan was player of the match.

== The final ==
Lydia Fitzpatrick's third goal for Loreto Kilkenny was described as reminiscent of John Fenton's memorable goal for Cork against Limerick in the 1987 Munster hurling semi-final:

Laura Porter's attempted clearance in the blink of an eye was blocked down, and Fitzpatrick almost unnoticed, pulled on the sliotar at 100 miles an hour and Lydia Fitzpatrick in an instant struck an unstoppable shot along the ground that flew aimlessly beyond the hapless goalkeeper Tara Murphy.

== 2012 Final ==
Loreto College, Kilkenny	St Brigid’s Loughrea

LORETO KILKENNY:
GK	1	Kirsty Maher (Dicksboro)
RCB	2	Orla Ryan (St Brigid's Ballycallan)
FB	3	Tracy Brennan (Lisdowney)
LCB	4	Sonia Buggy (Dicksboro)
RWB	5	Kate Holland (Lisdowney)
CB	6	Miriam Walsh (Tullaroan)
LWB	7	Noelle Maher (Tullaroan)
MF	8	Niamh Leahy (Emeralds) 0-1
MF	9	Lydia Fitzpatrick (St. Lachtain's) 1-0
RWF	10	Sarah Anne Quinlan (Young Irelands Gowran) 1-3
CF	11	Claire Phelan (Lisdowney) (captain) 1-1
LWF	12	Jenny Clifford (Dicksboro) 0-2
RCF	13	Orla Hanrick (Dicksboro) 0-1
FF	14	Sarah Dunphy (St Brigid's Ballycallan) 1-0
LCF	15	Aoife Murphy (Lisdowney) 0-2

ST BRIGID’S LOUGHREA:
GK	1	Tara Murphy
RCB	2	Shauna Coen
FB	3	Aisling Spellman
LCB	4	Laura Sweeny
RWB	5	Laura Porter
CB	6	Linda Porter
LWB	7	Miriam Reynolds
MF	8	Aisling Connolly
MF	9	Aoibhin Kenny (captain)
RWF	10	Lauren Lee
CF	11	Lorraine Farrell
LWF	12	Maria Cooney 0-1
RCF	13	Patricia Manning 1-1
FF	14	Rachel Monaghan 0-8 (0-7 frees)
LCF	15	Erica Coen

MATCH RULES

- 60 minutes
- Extra Time if scores level
- Maximum of 5 substitutions
