= Ballymacnab =

Village in County Armagh, Northern Ireland

Ballymacnab Baile Mhic an Aba
- Town
- Location in Ireland
- Coordinates: 54°17′54″N 6°38′24″W
- Country: Northern Ireland
- Province: Ulster
- County: County Armagh
- Elevation: 350 m (1,150 ft)
- Time zone: UTC+0 (WET)
  - Summer (DST): UTC-1 (IST (WEST))
- Irish Grid Reference: H886397

Ballymacnab (from Irish: Baile Mhic An Aba meaning "son of the abbot / McNab's town") is a townland and village in County Armagh, Northern Ireland. It is within the civil parish of Kilclooney, four miles south of the City of Armagh on the road towards Newtownhamilton. It is within the Armagh City and District Council area.

== Geography and history ==
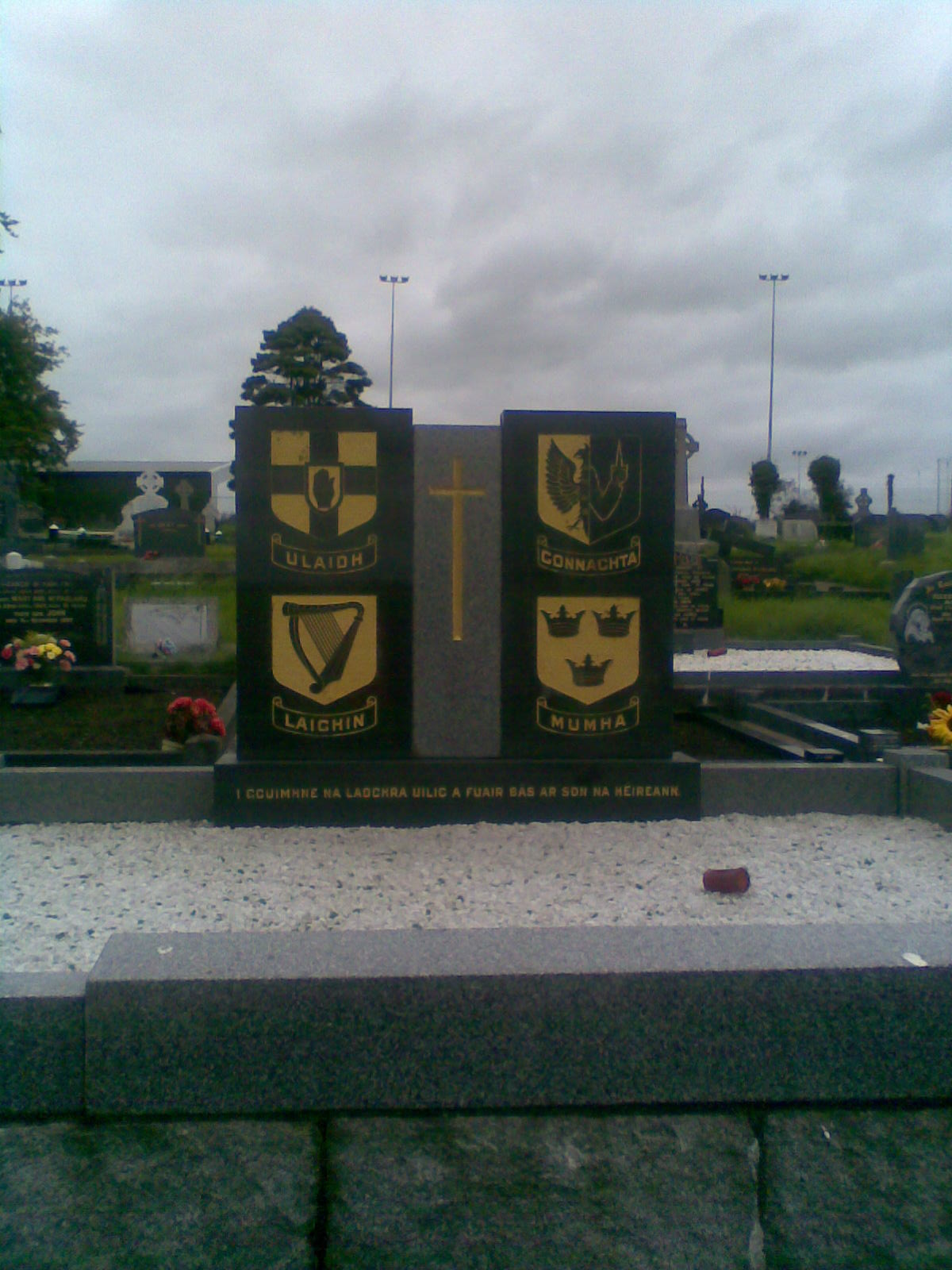
Republican Plot in St. Patrick's Church, Ballymacnab, depicting the four provinces of Ireland.

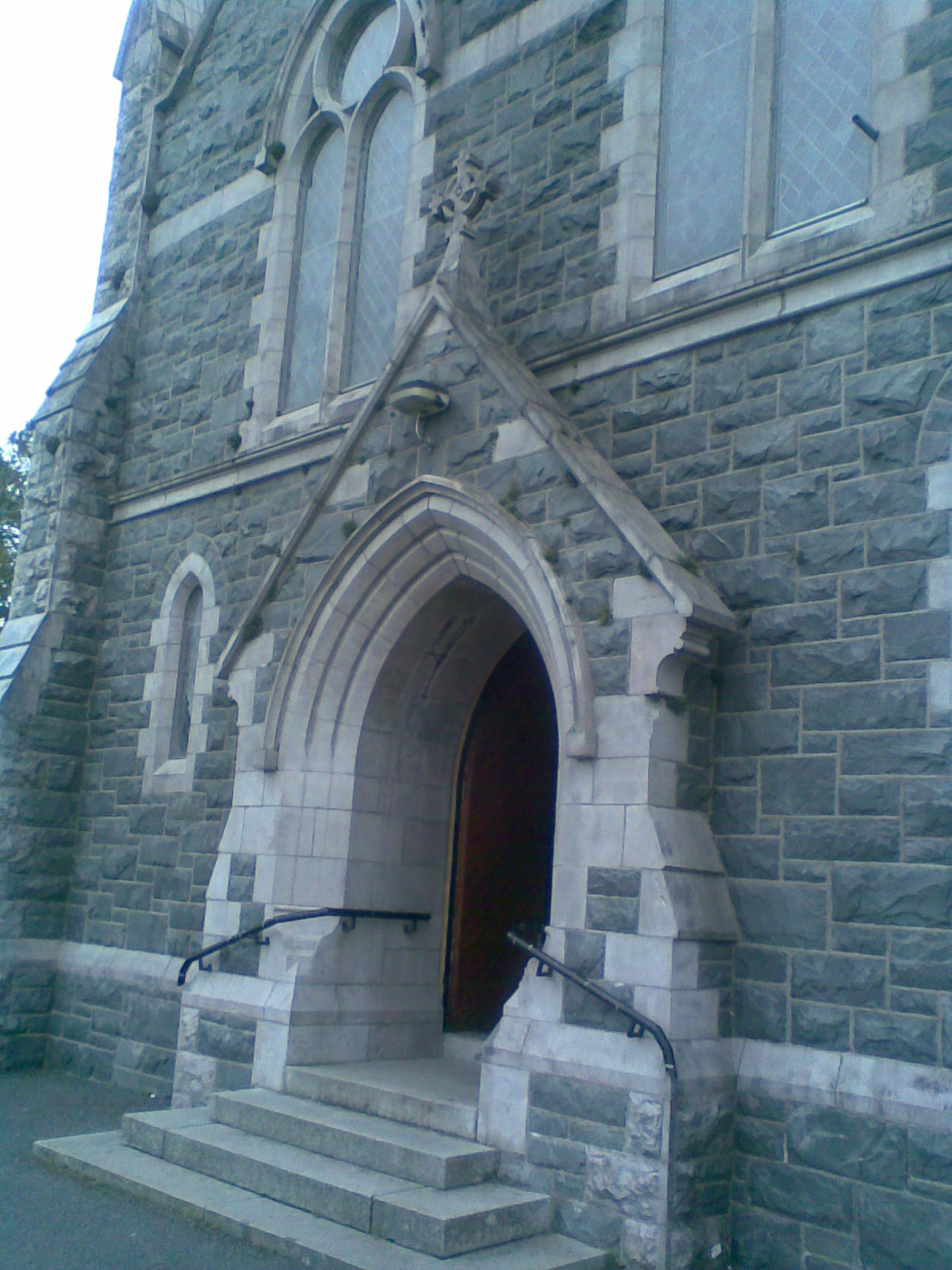
The entrance to St. Patrick's Church, Ballymacnab.

Local buildings and amenities include Saint Patrick's Roman Catholic Church, Foley primary school, and Ballymacnab Hall. The local pub, O'Toole's Bar, was originally used a safe house for priests and is over 200 years old. It was named Northern Ireland Pub of The Year in 2009.

Seagahan Lake Reservoir is located to the east of the village, and includes the nearby dam and Seagahan Water Treatment Works. Angling is permitted at the reservoir, subject to certain restrictions. In May 2008, Northern Ireland Water commenced a £6.6 Million project to upgrade water treatment technology and infrastructure at the plant in order for it to comply with a new EU directive on water quality.

The closest settlements are Granemore to the west, Clady to the south, Corran to the south-west, Keady to the south-west, Armagh to the north and Mullaghbrac to the east. The townland was previously part of lands confiscated from Catholic landowners and thereafter ceded to the Earl of Charlemont during the plantation of Ulster, for example James Caulfeild, 3rd Earl of Charlemont. The lands were worked by tenant farmers under the tithe and con-acre system.

The majority Catholic population of Ballymacnab was reduced by emigration in the late nineteenth and early twentieth centuries. Many of the emigrants settled in the west of Scotland and in particular, Glasgow.

=== The Troubles ===
For more information, see:

- The Troubles in Keady
- The Troubles in Armagh
- Provisional IRA South Armagh Brigade.

== Culture ==
In common with much of County Armagh, the area is referred to in local history and folklore. One famous story concerns the ‘Bull’s Track’. This is a landmark at the junction of the main Armagh/Newtownhamilton road and the Ballymacnab Road that leads to Seagahan Dam. A large stone marks the spot where it is claimed a large black bull landed after having been flung from neighbouring Armaghbreague Mountain by an angry Saint Patrick, after the same bull had knocked down the church he was building in Armaghbreague for the third consecutive night.

A mark which resembles the imprint of a Bull's Foot remains to this day, and recent refurbishment work to the landmark has attempted to highlight the Bull's Track as a tourist attraction.

== Sport ==
Ballymacnab is home to Gaelic football club Ballymacnab Round Towers GAC, which plays its home games at Pairc na nGael. Ballymacnab is also home to the successful Saint Brenda's camogie club.

== See also ==
- Keady

== Bibliography ==
- Connolly, S.J. (Ed); (2004). The Oxford Companion to Irish History. ISBN 0-19-280501-0.
- Burrowes, J; (2003). Irish: The Remarkable Saga of a Nation and a City. ISBN 1-84018-685-2.
- Coogan, T.P; (2002). Wherever Green Is Worn: The Story of the Irish Diaspora. ISBN 0-09-995850-3
- Guinnane, T (1997). The Vanishing Irish: Households, Migration, and the Rural Economy in Ireland. ISBN 0-691-04307-8.
- Sloan, W. Cummings & Devine (Eds) (1997). Employment Opportunities and Migrant Group Assimilation: the Highlanders and Irish in Glasgow, 1840-1900 in Proc. Industry, Business & Society.
