= Keady Viaduct =

Railway viaduct in County Armagh, Northern Ireland

Coordinates: 54.250724°N 6.700871°W

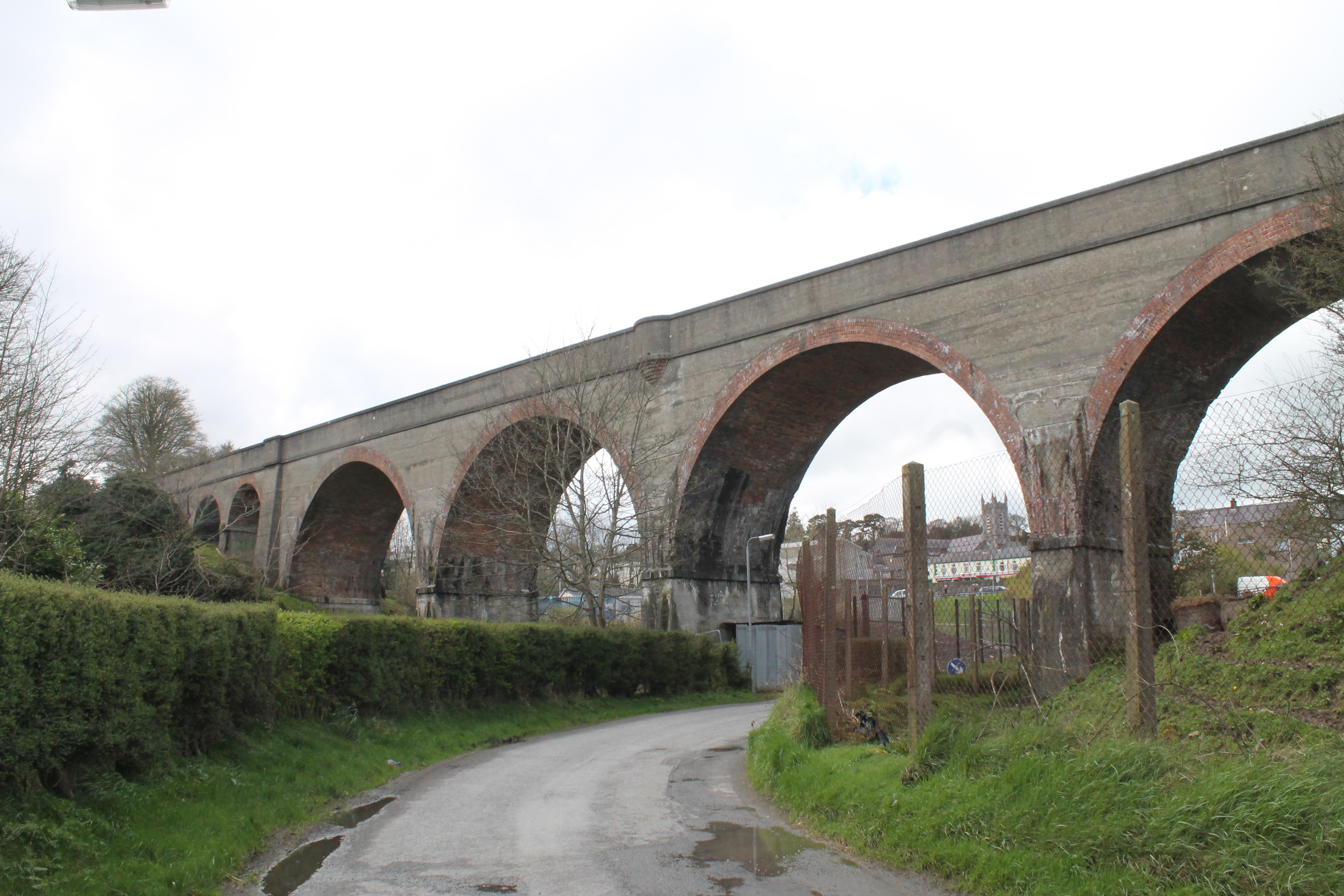
The viaduct in 2014

The Keady Viaduct is a railway viaduct near Keady, County Armagh, Northern Ireland.

== History ==
The viaduct was completed in 1910, and crosses the Glen Road. It was originally part of the Castleblayney, Keady and Armagh Railway, though services to Castleblayney were ended in 1924. Ultimately the Keady Viaduct carried trains for a mere 14 years. The line had been taken over by the Great Northern Railway (Ireland) shortly after opening.

In August 1993, Keady Viaduct became a Grade B listed building.

== Design ==
The viaduct is roughly 84 metres long. It consists of 6 arches, the four northernmost being the same length and the two southernmost being half the length as the rest. It is built out of concrete with brick arches.
