= The Troubles in Keady =

Incidents in Keady, Northern Ireland, during the Troubles

The Troubles in Keady refers to incidents taking place in Keady, County Armagh, Northern Ireland during the Troubles.

Incidents in Keady during the Troubles resulting in one or more fatalities:

== 1972 ==
- 21 January 1972 - Stentiford, Philip (18) British Army (BA), Killed by: Irish Republican Army (IRA) in land mine attack on British Army (BA) foot patrol, Derrynoose, near Keady, County Armagh.

== 1973 ==
- 15 November 1973 - McVerry, Michael (23) Irish Republican Army (IRA), Killed by: Royal Ulster Constabulary (RUC) during a gun attack on Keady British Army (BA) / Royal Ulster Constabulary (RUC) base in Keady, County Armagh.

- 15 December 1973 - Ivan Johnson (34) ex-Royal Ulster Constabulary (RUC). Killed by Irish Republican Army (IRA) Found shot in Derrynoose, near Keady, County Armagh.

== 1975 ==
- 31 August 1975 - Lance Corporal Joseph Reid (48) 2nd County Armagh Battalion, Ulster Defence Regiment. Shot while at home on his farm in Farnaloy, near Keady, County Armagh . He was also an Ulster Unionist Councillor.
- 10 November 1975 - Joseph Nesbitt (53) Ulster Defence Regiment (UDR), Killed by Irish Republican Army (IRA). Shot by sniper, while travelling in his car to Gough British Army (BA) base, Armagh, at Caramoyle, near Keady, County Armagh.

== 1976 ==
- 16 August 1976 - Elizabeth McDonald (38) and Gerard McGleenan (22), both Catholic civilians, were killed in a car bomb explosion outside the Step Inn, Keady. Twenty-two others were wounded. It is believed that the Ulster Volunteer Force was responsible and the attack has been linked to the "Glenanne gang".
- 15 December 1976 - Bartender Pat McGeown (25) Catholic civilian is shot dead by the British Army at the Mockingbird Bar, Keady, County Armagh.

== 1977 ==
- 18 October 1977 - John Anderson, (61) Protestant ex-Royal Ulster Constabulary (RUC), killed by Irish Republican Army (IRA) Shot while driving his car, Girvan’s Bridge, near Keady, County Armagh.

== 1978 ==
- 19 August 1978 - Gilbert Johnston (25) ex-Ulster Defence Regiment (xUR), Killed by Irish Republican Army (IRA) Shot outside shop, Keady, County Armagh.

== 1979 ==
- 9 June 1979 - Peadar McElvanna (24) Irish Republican Army (IRA), Killed by the British Army (BA) during gun battle between Irish Republican Army (IRA) and British Army (BA), Keady, County Armagh.

- 24 February 1979 - Martin McGuigan (16) and James Keenan (16) Catholic Civilians, Killed by Irish Republican Army (IRA). Killed by remote controlled bomb hidden in trailer, detonated when he walked past, Darkley, near Keady, County Armagh. Mistaken for British Army (BA) foot patrol.

== 1980 ==
- 29 August 1980 - Frank McGrory died after inadvertently detonating a booby trap bomb which had been hidden in a hedgerow, at Carnagh, County Armagh, near Keady; it is believed to have been left there by the INLA for use against the security forces

== 1983 ==
- 20 November 1983 - Harold Browne (59), Victor Cunningham (39) and David Wilson (44) where killed while attending a church service at Mountain Lodge Pentecostal Church, Darkley. The attackers were rogue members of the Irish National Liberation Army (INLA). They claimed responsibility using the cover name "Catholic Reaction Force",
- 13 April 1983 - Trevor Elliot (38) Protestant, British Army Territorial Army (TA), Killed by Irish Republican Army (IRA) Off duty. Shot at his shop, Keady, County Armagh

== 1993 ==
- 8 March 1993 - Nigel McCollum (25), a Protestant civilian, was killed while working as a contractor at the British Army/RUC base during an IRA mortar attack.
- 2 December 1993 - Paul Garret (23), a member of the British army, was killed by a sniper while on foot patrol along Victoria Street.

== 1994 ==
- 14 May 1994 - David Wilson (27), a member of the British Army, was killed by an IRA bomb attack on a permanent British army checkpoint.

== 2005 ==
- Martin Conlon (35) Catholic ex-real Irish Republican Army Killed by Dissident Republican group. Abducted from a house outside Armagh before being shot three times and his body dumped at Farnaloy Road near Keady, South Armagh. [Police speculated that the killing had been carried out by dissident republicans with whom he was believed to be linked. On 10 November 2005 the CIRA issued a statement to deny any involvement with the killing.]
