= Presentation Secondary School, Kilkenny =

Location
- Kilkenny, County Kilkenny; Ireland
- Coordinates: 52.639159°N 7.247506°W

Information
- Type: Secondary school
- Religious affiliation: Catholic
- Established: 1800; 226 years ago
- Principal: Shane Hallahan
- Enrollment: 750
- Affiliation: Presentation Sisters
- Website: presentationkilkenny.com

The Presentation Secondary School, Kilkenny is an all girls secondary school catering for students between the ages of 12-19 around the Kilkenny city, and the surrounding areas. The school has a Catholic ethos and falls under the Trusteeship of Catholic Education an Irish Schools Trust.

== Academic ==
The school operates Junior Certificate, Transition Year, Leaving Certificate Applied, the L.C.V.P. programme, also called Link Modules and Leaving Certificate courses. The school has a number of non-academic activities for the students.

== History ==
Isabella McLoughlin and Catherine Meighan trained in Cove Lane in Cork City with the Presentation Sisters which had been founded by Nano Nagle. Isabella became Sr. M. Joseph McLoughlin, aged 23 and Catherine became Sr M. de Sales Meighan in June 1800. The two young women were from St. Mary's Parish Kilkenny city. The Bishop of Ossory, Dr. James Lanigan wanted to bring the kind of caring for the sick and education of the poor to come to Kilkenny and he arranged for the religious sisters to come to the city in September 1800. With the permission given by Bishop Hamilton of the Church of Ireland they were able to open a convent and school in Kilkenny a month later. Permission was needed due to the continued Penal Laws. The nuns were noted for having worn their habits as soon as they took over the building.

The school started as a primary school with sixty girls within a month of the arrival of the nuns. This school was housed within the convent which was possible through the donation of Mr. James Murphy of Dublin. The school also provided some education for adults in the evenings Expansion needs meant that new buildings were added in 1817 on Chapel lane.

After the 1930s, the convent added the post primary school to the campus. The continued growth of the secondary school through the 20th century combined with the open nature of the old buildings on the James's St. campus which were being used for the secondary school lead to the purchase and building of a new school in Loughboy which was opened in November 1985.

The convent and buildings in James St. and Chapel Lane were knocked down in order to make way for the Market Cross shopping centre.

In 2016, the school choir appeared on the TV show Britain's Got Talent. 57 students and the choir director got through the open auditions to appear in front of the judges where they got four Yes votes. They advanced to the live semi finals.

== Notable people ==
- Walter Scott (1771–1832), poet and author
- Maureen Hegarty (1921–2016), historian
