= Coachford College =

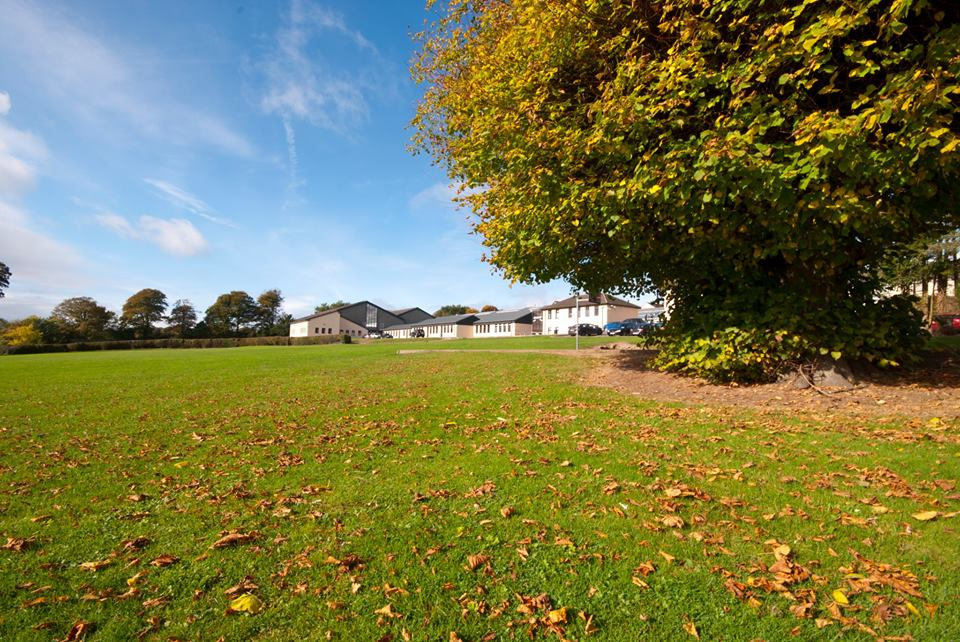
- The grounds of Coachford College

Location
- Coachford, County Cork; P12 DY92; Ireland; 51.9120°N 8.7932°W

Information
- Type: Secondary school
- Founded: 1953; 73 years ago
- Principal: Áine Máire Ní Fhaoláin
- Enrollment: 841 (2023)
- Website: coachfordcollege.ie
- Last updated: 29 Aug 2020

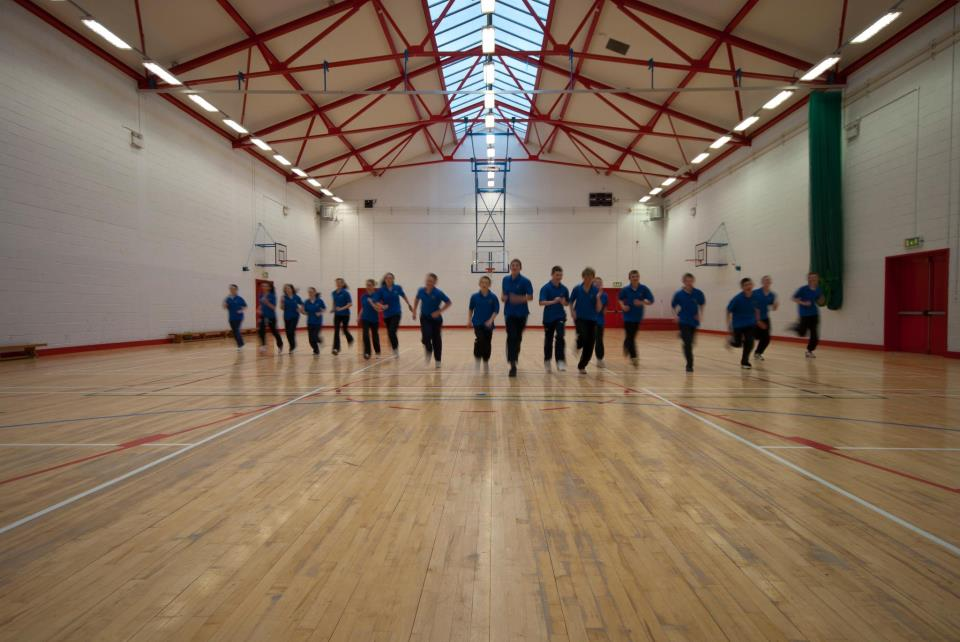
Sports Hall at Coachford College

Coachford College is a post primary school located in Coachford, County Cork, Ireland. Situated in the Lee Valley, 22 km west of Cork city, the catchment area stretches from Kanturk to Bandon, and from Ballincollig to Macroom. Coachford College is part of Cork Education and Training Board (ETB). As of 2017, there were over 610 students enrolled in the school, increasing to 841 students by 2023.

== Enrolment ==
Enrolment in Coachford College is in accordance with their admissions policy. Coachford College is the sole provider in the catchment boundary area and most students from primary schools in the area attend Coachford College. 114 students started in Coachford College in September 2015, 134 starting in Sept 2016, 137 starting in Sept 2017, 142 students starting in Sept 2018, 152 students starting in 2019.

In 2015, additional school developments were announced for Coachford College to accommodate 1000 students. A temporary accommodation block of seven classrooms opened in May 2021, and funding was allocated in 2020 for the construction of a new school building.

The school uses Google Classroom, and also uses VSWare to assist parents in accessing student attendance and academic progress.

== Activities ==
In sports, male students have the option of participating in hurling, football, or volleyball, while female students can take part in camogie, basketball, volleyball, or ladies' football. The school also has or previously had teams in equestrian, golf, athletics, and frisbee. while volleyball made a debut for both boys and girls.

== Alumni ==
- Liam Miller (1981–2018), professional footballer; Celtic F.C.
