= Keady =

Town in County Armagh, Northern Ireland

Coordinates: 54.2483°N 6.7046°W

Keady: Irish: An Céide
- Town
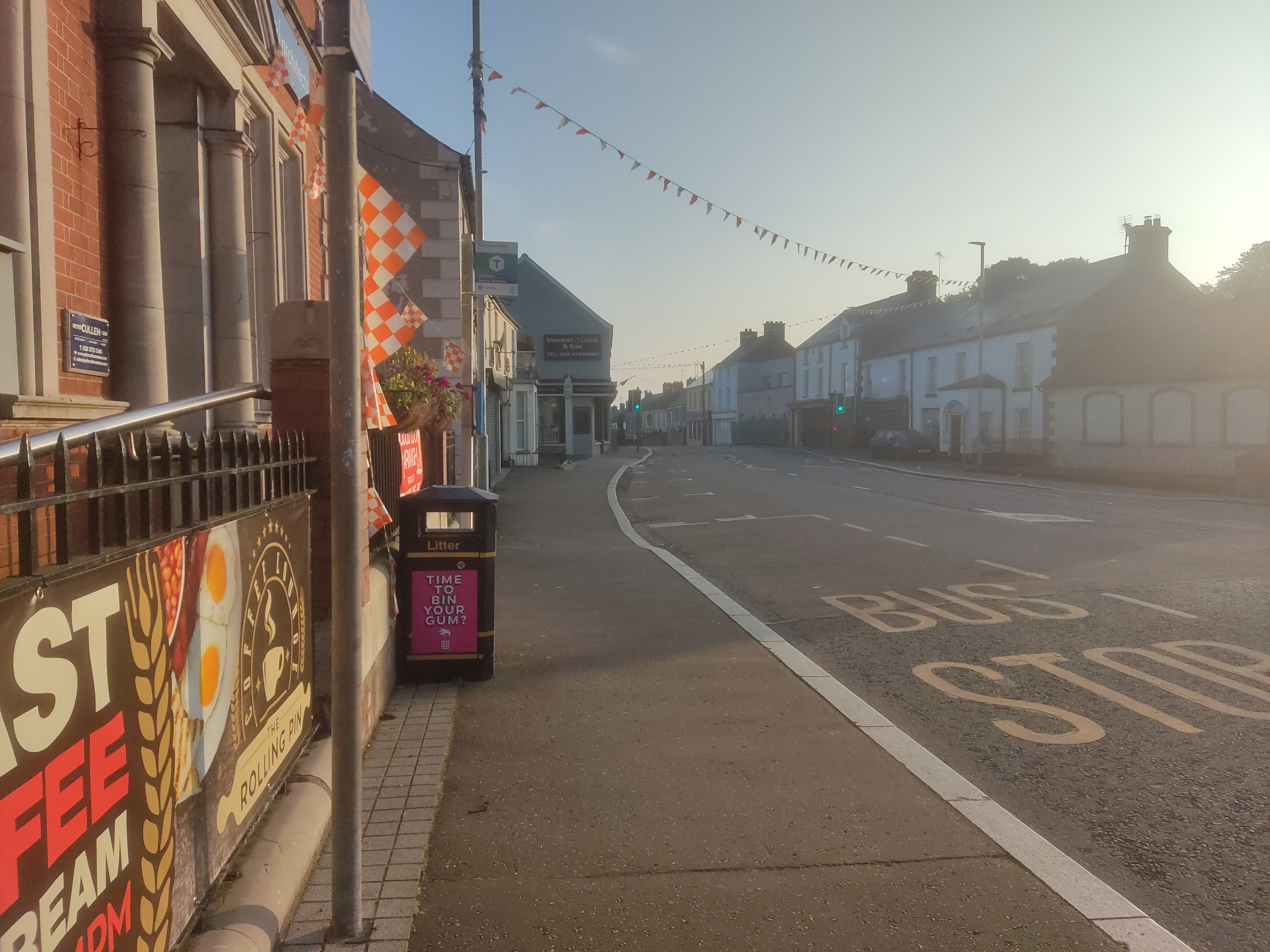
- Kinelowen Street

- Location within Northern Ireland
- Population: 3,327 (2021 census)
- Irish grid reference: H844340
- District: Armagh City, Banbridge and Craigavon
- County: County Armagh
- Country: Northern Ireland
- Sovereign state: United Kingdom
- Post town: ARMAGH
- Postcode district: BT60
- Dialling code: 028
- Police: Northern Ireland
- Fire: Northern Ireland
- Ambulance: Northern Ireland
- UK Parliament: Newry and Armagh
- NI Assembly: Newry and Armagh

Keady (from Irish An Céide, meaning 'the flat-topped hill') is a small historic market town and civil parish in County Armagh, Northern Ireland. It is south of Armagh and near the border with the Republic of Ireland. It is situated mainly in the historic barony of Armagh with six townlands in the barony of Tiranny. It had a population of 3,327 people in the 2021 census.

A tributary of the River Callan, known as the Clea, flows from its source in Clea Lake (also spelled as Clay Lake) through the middle of the town. The River Clea once powered Keady's millwheels. In the middle of the town, on the banks of the river, stands the Old Mill, which has been converted into workshops and offices.

== History ==
At this time the Tyronne o'Neills entered the Fews through Middletown and Madden and left distinctive inheritance in Keady - two sons, Cairbre and Aobh.

The townland southwest of the village, Rathcarbery is translated as the ''Fort of Cairbre''. Keady's main street, Kinelowen means ''the seeds of owen'' and the most popular local surname Hughes is a derivative of Aodh, the Anglicised name being Hugh.

By 1804 the town consisted of Church Street, Main Street and Madden Row with a lane, (Drury Lane) now Davis Street leading up to the original Presbyterian church which was built in 1776.

=== The Troubles ===
For more information see The Troubles in Keady, which includes a list of incidents in Keady during the Troubles resulting in two or more deaths.

== Demography ==
=== 2021 Census ===
On Census day (21 March 2021) there were 3,327 people living in Keady.

=== 2011 Census ===
On Census day (27 March 2011) the population of Keady was 3,051, accounting for 0.17% of the NI total. Of these:

- 21.53% were aged under 16 years and 14.00% were aged 65 and over
- 48.90% of the population were male and 51.10% were female
- 87.45% were from a Catholic background and 10.32% were from a 'Protestant and Other Christian (including Christian related)' background

== Transport ==
- The railway arrived in Keady in 1909, with the opening of the Castleblayney, Keady and Armagh Railway line (owned by the Great Northern Railway Ireland) from Armagh, which was extended to Castleblayney in 1910. Keady railway station opened on 31 May 1909, closed for passenger traffic on 1 February 1932 and finally closed altogether on 1 October 1957. As a cross border line, when the Irish Free State was created in 1922, it lost all passenger traffic in 1923, with freight being withdrawn from the cross border section from Castleblayney to Keady in 1924. The Armagh to Keady freight service was withdrawn on 1 October 1957.
- There is a railway viaduct in Keady as well as one of the more interesting artifacts of Irish railway history, the tunnel for the Ulster and Connaught Light Railway. This was a proposal for a narrow gauge line from Greenore, County Louth to Clifden, County Galway, for which the tunnel under the railway embankment at Keady was built, but never used. Ulsterbus now use part of the tunnel as a bus garage.
- Ulsterbus operates a few routes through the town to Armagh, these include the 69/a (Darkley)/c (Castleblayney).

== Churches in Keady ==
- St Patrick's Church, Keady, is one of the largest churches in the Archdiocese of Armagh in regard to seating capacity. Built in 1860, it was extended and extensively renovated in 1989.
- Keady Baptist Church, Pastor Paul McAdam
- The Temple Presbyterian, Rev Ian Abraham
- Second Keady Presbyterian, Rev Alan Marsh
- St Matthew's Church of Ireland

== Schools ==
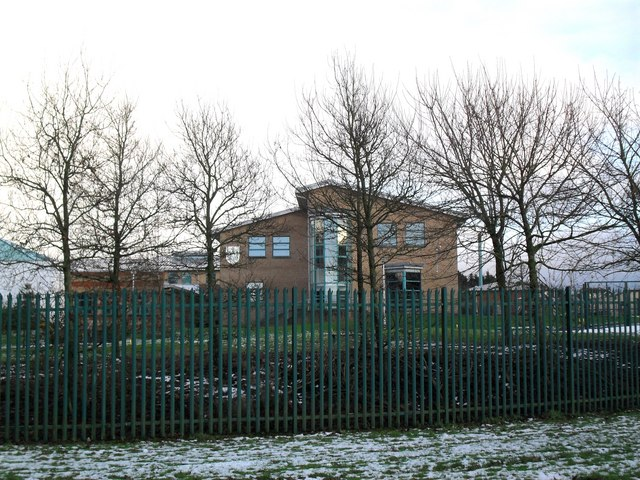
St Patrick's High School

- Clea Primary School
- Keady Primary School
- St. Francis of Assisi Primary School
- St. Mary's Boys' School (Keady)
- St Patrick's High School (Keady)

== Civil parish of Keady ==
The civil parish contains the villages of Darkley and Keady.

=== Townlands ===
The civil parish contains the following townlands:

- Aughnagurgan
- Brackly
- Cargaclogher
- Carrickduff
- Clay
- Corkley
- Crossdened
- Crossmore
- Crossnamoyle
- Crossnenagh
- Darkley
- Drumderg
- Dundrum
- Dunlarg
- Granemore
- Iskymeadow
- Kilcam
- Lagan
- Racarbry
- Tassagh
- Tievenamara
- Tullyglush
- Tullynamalloge

== People ==
- Cathal Boylan (born 1964) Sinn Féin MLA
- Michael Colgan, (born 1973) actor
- Jimmy Jones (1928–2014) footballer
- Tommy Makem (1932–2007) singer, musician, and songwriter
- Sarah Makem (1900–1983) Traditional Irish singer
- Dessie O'Hare (born 1956) Irish republican paramilitary
- John Dillon Nugent (1869–1940) Irish nationalist politician
- Louisa Watson Peat (1883–1953) was an Irish-born writer and lecturer.

== See also ==
- List of civil parishes of County Armagh
- List of towns and villages in Northern Ireland
