= 2010 All-Ireland Colleges Camogie Championship =

Camogie championship

All Ireland Colleges Championship 2010
Winners
- Champions: Loreto, Kilkenny (2nd title)
- Captain: Aisling Dunphy

Runners-up
- Runners-up: Blackwater CS, Lismore
- Captain: Shauna Kieran Marie Russell

The 2010 All-Ireland Colleges Camogie Championship was won by Loreto, Kilkenny, who defeated Blackwater CS, Lismore by 2–5 to 1–7 in the final on March 6, 2010, at Ardfinnan. Lismore's one-point defeat in the final narrowly prevented a unique treble for the sport of Senior C, Senior B and Senior A titles in successive years.

== Graded Competitions ==
There were graded competitions for colleges at three different levels. In the 2010 All Ireland Senior B final, Colaiste Choilm, Ballincollig from Cork defeated Borris Vocational School from Carlow by 3–9 to 2–5, in Cahir. In the 2010 All Ireland Senior C final Presentation, Thurles defeated Banagher Community School by 3–18 to 1–1 in Toomevara.

== Trophy ==
The trophy is the Corn Sceilge in honour of Seán Ó Ceallaigh (1872–1959) (known as Sceilg, an acronym of his name in Irish: Seán S. Ó Ceallaigh), one of the members of the Keating Branch of the Gaelic League that participated in the first Camogie matches in 1904. The shape of the cup is on the lines of the Ardagh Chalice.

== Semi-finals ==
At the inter-provincial stages of the 2010 competition Blackwater CS, Lismore defeated Portumna Community School 3–5 to 0–3 and Loreto, Kilkenny defeated St Patrick's College, Maghera, 2–11 to 3-07 in the semi-finals. In the Senior B semi-finals Coláiste Choilm, Ballincollig defeated Holy Rosary, Mountbellew by 2–14 to 0–3. Borris VS, Carlow beat St Colm's, Draperstown 2–5 to 3-0 after Colm's led by three goals to two points at half time. In the Senior C semi-finals Presentation, Thurles beat Seamount, Kinvara 3–11 to 1–1 and Banagher CS defeated St Louis, Kilkeel 5–6 to 4–6 in a replay after drawing 3–4 to 2–7.

== 2010 Final ==
| Loreto College, Kilkenny | Lismore Community School, Waterford |

WIT:
| GK | 1 | Sinéad Maher (Dicksboro) |
| RCB | 2 | Stacey Quirke (St Martin's) |
| FB | 3 | Niamh Kelly (Dicksboro) |
| LCB | 4 | Sarah Dunne (Graigue-Balycallan) (substituted off) 43' |
| RWB | 5 | Caoimhe Shiel (Bennetsbridge) |
| CB | 6 | Grace Walsh (Tullaroan) |
| LWB | 7 | Nicola Butler (Graigue-Balycallan) |
| MF | 8 | Aisling Dunphy (Graigue-Balycallan) (captain) |
| MF | 9 | Niamh Byrne (Clara) |
| RWF | 10 | Aine Curran (St. Lachtain's) 0–1 |
| CF | 11 | Claire Phelan (Lisdowney) 0–2 (2 frees) |
| LWF | 12 | Aoife Nolan (O'Loughlin Gaels) 1-0 (substituted off) 30' |
| RCF | 13 | Aisling O'Grady(Dicksboro) (substituted off) 43' |
| FF | 14 | Orla Hanrick (Dicksboro) 0–1 (substituted off) 37' |
| LCF | 15 | Lydia Fitzpatrick (St. Lachtain's) 1–1 |
Substitutes:
| LWF | | Aoife Murphy (Lisdowney) for Nolan (substituted in) 30' |
| RCF | | Kate Holland (Lisdowney) for O'Grady (substituted in) 43' |
| LCB | | Noelle Maher (Tullaroan) for Dunne (substituted in) 43' |

UCC:
| GK | 1 | Tracey Kiely |
| RCB | 2 | Shauna Prendergast |
| FB | 3 | Jenny McCarthy |
| LCB | 4 | Emma Foley |
| RWB | 5 | Jessica Gavin Johnson |
| CB | 6 | Shauna Kieran (co-captain) |
| LWB | 7 | Sarah Fenton |
| MF | 8 | Marie Russell (co-captain) 0–5 (frees) |
| MF | 9 | Michelle Tobin |
| RWF | 10 | Aoife Hannon |
| CF | 11 | Jemma Burke (substituted off) 41' |
| LWF | 12 | Clara Aarons |
| RCF | 13 | Ruth Geoghegan |
| FF | 14 | Caitriona McGlone 1–1 |
| LCF | 15 | Niamh Prendergast 0–1 |
Substitutes:
| LWF | | E Heneghan for Burke (substituted in) 41' |

- MATCH RULES
- 60 minutes
- Extra Time if scores level
- Maximum of 5 substitutions
