= St Mary's Secondary School, Charleville =

Secondary school in County Cork, Ireland

Location
- Charleville, Cork; Ireland; 52.3544°N 8.6870°W

Information
- Established: c. 1838
- Gender: Girls
- Enrollment: 302 (2026)
- Website: stmaryscharleville.ie

St. Mary's Secondary School is an all-girls secondary school located in Charleville, County Cork, Ireland. Founded in 1838 by Catherine McAuley, it is historically associated with the nearby Sisters of Mercy convent. Originally operated from a "room in the convent", the school had moved to separate premises nearby by the late 19th century. During the 20th century, additional facilities were opened and, in 2000, the current school building was officially opened by Micheál Martin (then Minister for Education) and John Magee (then Bishop of Cloyne). St Mary's Secondary School is operated by CEIST (Catholic Education an Irish Schools Trust). Sports played at the school include camogie and, as of 2014, the school had reportedly "won 31 All-Ireland camogie titles across various age-groups" since 1986. As of 2026, it had an enrollment of approximately 300 girls.
