= Granemore =

Coordinates: 54.253°N 6.651°W

Granemore: Irish: Grainseach mor
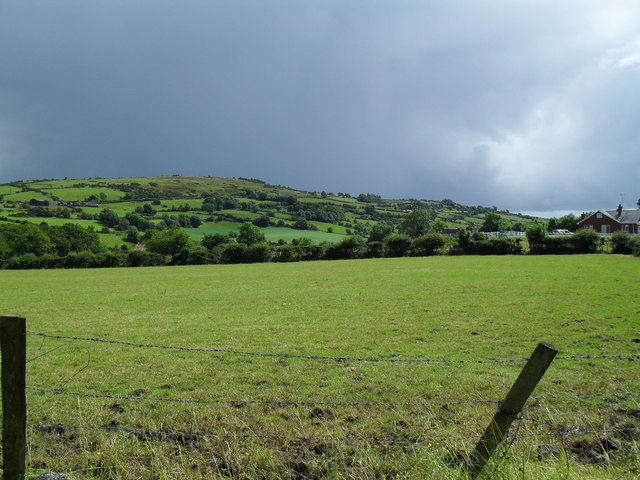
- Granemore townland in 2009

- Location within Northern Ireland
- County: Armagh
- Country: Northern Ireland
- Sovereign state: United Kingdom
- Postcode district: BT60
- Dialling code: 028

Granemore (from Irish Grainseach mor, meaning 'great grange') is a townland of 785 acres in County Armagh, Northern Ireland, about seven miles from Armagh and three miles from Keady. It is situated in the civil parish of Keady and historic barony of Armagh. Granemore is one of the townlands that make up the parish of Cill Chluana in the Archdiocese of Armagh, one of the three churches of the parish is St Mary's Church, neighbouring St Mary's Primary School in Granemore.

== Attack on The Rock Bar ==
The local pub, The Rock Bar, was attacked by Glenanne Gang, which included members of the RUC, UDR and UVF in June 1976 in a planned gun and bomb attack. However, a local resident, Michael McGrath left the bar as the gang were planting their device and disrupted their plan. Although McGrath was shot a number of times, he managed to survive the incident. It was later revealed that some members of the Royal Ulster Constabulary (RUC) police force from Keady were involved with the attack.

== Murder of James McGleenan ==
On 17 March 1922, James McGleenan, a catholic man in his late 50s from the Granemore area, was murdered near Dundrum Crossroads in Granemore by members of the Ulster Special Constabulary (commonly known as the “B-Specials”). The Specials claimed that McGleenan had ignored a warning to stop as he walked past them. McGleenan had spent much of his working life in a local beetling mill and was reported to have a hearing impairment as a result of his occupation.

The incident occurred shortly after the partition of Ireland and the establishment of the northern state and this murder was one of the first state killings following the treaty. A wooden cross was erected at the spot where James McGleenan was murdered.

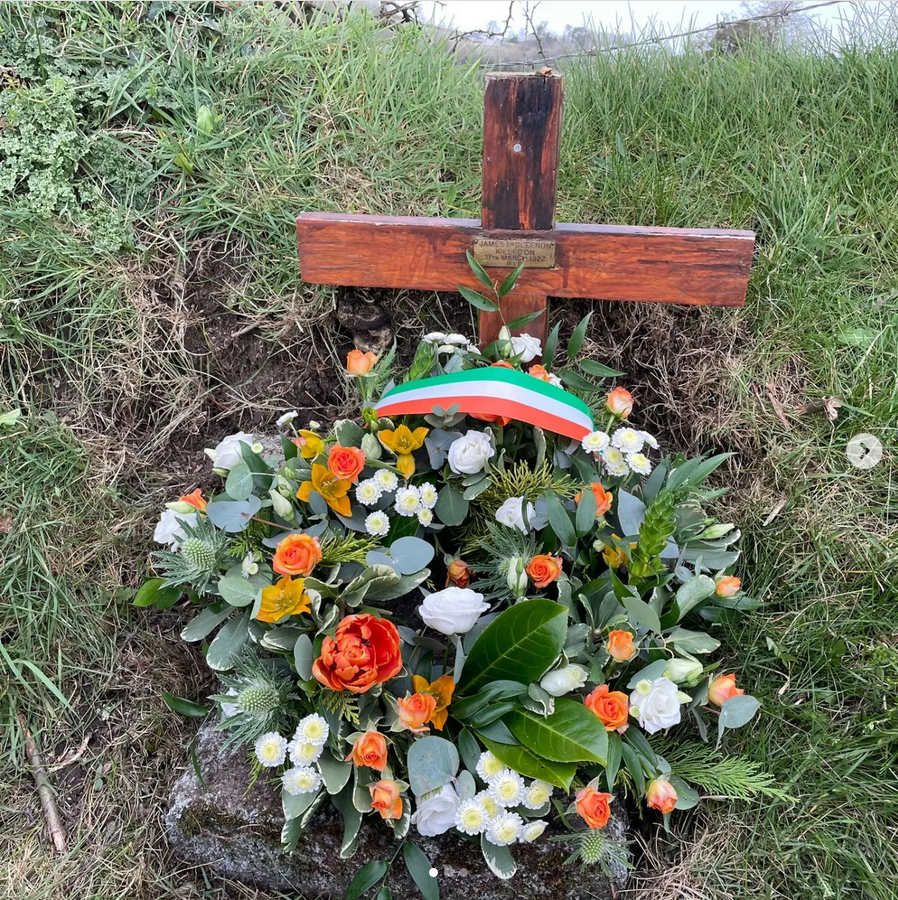
A wooden cross in Granemore marking the spot where James McGleenan was murdered on 17th March 1922

== Granemore Bold Defenders ==
The Granemore Bold Defenders refers to the local Defender organisation that emerged in the Granemore district of south County Armagh during the 1780s, one of the earliest recorded centres of Defender activity in Ireland. Contemporary accounts of the Armagh disturbances note that Granemore, near Ballymacnab and Keady, had been subjected to raids by Peep o' Day Boys, prompting local Catholics to organise for protection. In response, inhabitants of the area formed one of the earliest Defender groups, initially operating as night-time patrols to guard homes and farmland from attack.

In Granemore, this organisation quickly developed beyond an informal watch system. Early members acquired firearms through local purchase—reportedly even from a Protestant shopkeeper in Armagh—before turning to raids on nearby gentry houses to secure additional weapons. The Granemore group participated in nightly patrols and defensive mobilisation, and by the mid-1780s had become actively opposed to the Peep o’ Day Boys, forming part of a wider pattern of escalating rural conflict across the county.

By around 1790, the Granemore Defenders had been absorbed into the broader Defender network that spread throughout Ulster, transforming from a purely local defence group into part of a structured, oath-bound secret society composed largely of working-class Catholics. This wider organisation developed lodge systems and regional coordination, linking places such as Granemore into a county-wide and eventually province-wide movement.

=== Bradshaw's Gulf ===
The story of “Bradshaw’s Gulf” is a local tradition associated with the townland of Corran, midway between Granemore and Clady Chapels in south Armagh. According to the account, the name derives from a man called Bradshaw who is said to have lived near Portadown in the late eighteenth and early nineteenth century and was regarded as hostile to Catholics. While travelling through the Granemore area after attending a cockfight near Castleblaney, he was recognised by a travelling-man tailor staying in a local house, who reported Bradshaw as a 'spy' to Felix Conroy and a local man known as Sherry. The men, joined by a third figure named Daly, followed Bradshaw to McGivern’s in Corran. There, after a confrontation, he was beaten and later died; his body was reportedly buried secretly in Kelly’s Bog to prevent discovery by the Yeomen. The place where the incident occurred subsequently became known locally as “Bradshaw’s Gulf” (also “Bratchies”).

Local tradition connects the episode with the activities of the Granemore Defenders. Conroy, Sherry and Daly are remembered in oral history and in a locally composed poem as defenders of the community, and the place-name Bradshaw’s Gulf is said to preserve the memory of the incident. Later folklore claims that the killing provoked reprisals against Catholics in the surrounding area, including the burning of houses and widespread persecution. The story forms part of the broader tradition linking the Granemore Defenders with resistance to the Yeomanry and sectarian conflict in the region during the late eighteenth century.

== Sport ==
It is home to the local Gaelic Athletic Association (GAA) club Granemore GFC, which includes both senior and underage football and camogie teams.
