= Colaiste Choilm =

School in Cork, Ireland

Coordinates: 51.8898°N 8.5801°W

Coláiste Choilm
- Ballincollig, County Cork, Ireland

Information
- Established: 1987
- Principal: Michelle Sliney
- Enrollment: 1359
- Colours: Blue and White
- Website: http://www.colaistechoilm.ie/

Coláiste Choilm is a mixed second-level school in Ballincollig in Cork, Ireland. The school was founded in 1987 to meet demand for second-level education in the rapidly growing satellite town of Ballincollig. Since 1991 it has had a gaelscoil co-located on its campus, Gaelcholáiste Choilm.

For the 2023/2024 academic year the school reported an attendance of 675 girls and 684 boys for a total of 1359 students.

The school has had two overall winners of the BT Young Scientist and Technology Exhibition. Simon Meehan won in 2018. Alan O’Sullivan and Cormac Harris won in 2020.

== Alumni ==
- Daniel Goulding (b. 1986) - Gaelic footballer
- Ciarán Sheehan (b. 1990) - Gaelic footballer
- Seán O'Donoghue (b. 1996) - hurler
- Cian Kiely (b. 1996) - Gaelic footballer
