= Loreto Secondary School, Kilkenny =

Secondary school for girls in Ireland

- Meánscoil Loreto
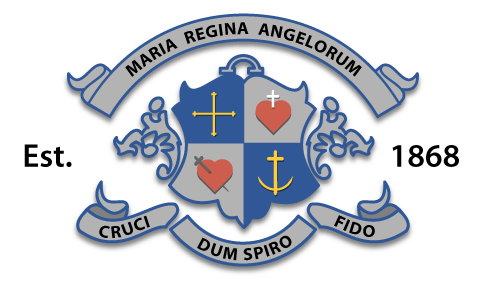

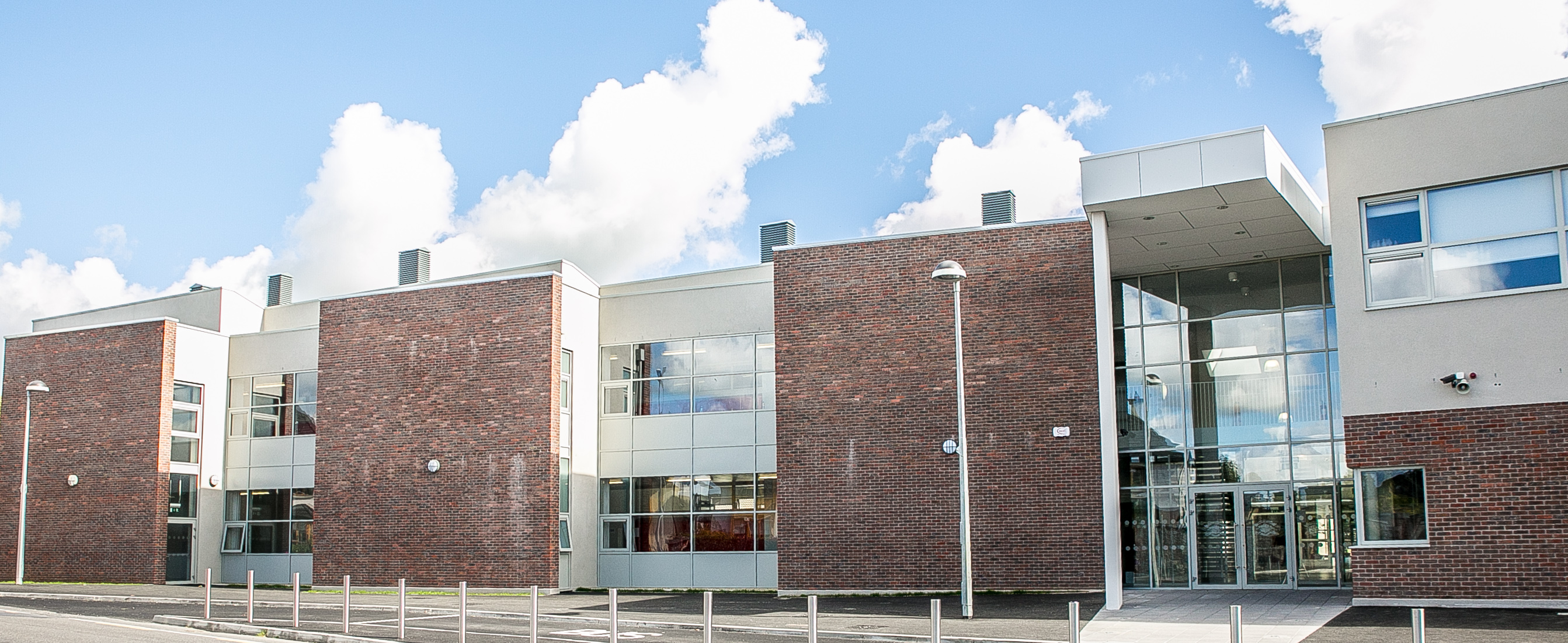

Location
- Granges Road, R95 W2NV; Kilkenny; Ireland
- Coordinates: 52.659°N 7.261°W

Information
- Type: Voluntary Secondary School
- Motto: Cruci dum spiro fido (Throughout my life, I shall place my hope in the Cross)
- Religious affiliation: Roman Catholic
- Established: 9 September 1868; 157 years ago
- Founder: M.M. Scholastica Somers, Loreto Sisters
- Trust: Loreto Education Trust
- Chairperson: Tony Joyce
- Principal: Marian Moran
- Gender: Girls
- Age range: 11-19
- Enrollment: 1,020
- Colours: Royal blue and grey
- Website: loretokk.ie

Loreto Secondary School, Kilkenny is a Roman Catholic voluntary secondary school for girls in Kilkenny, Ireland. It was founded by the Sisters of Loreto in 1868 as a boarding and day school for girls. Its first home was, for a brief time, in Patrick Street. The sisters and school then moved to the building that now is home to the Good Shepherd Centre. A new campus was completed on the Granges Road in 1980 when the school transferred to its present location. In 1984 the boarding section was discontinued.

== Teachers ==
- Maureen Hegarty (1921-2016) - local historian, former vice-principal
