= List of Harlequin Romance novels released in 1950 =

This is a list of Harlequin Romance novels released in 1950. (Main index: List of Harlequin Romance novels)

== Releases ==
Number	Title	Author	Date released	Citation
# 27	Kiss Your Elbow	Alan Handley	1950	
# 28	One Year With Grace	Martin Mooney	1950	
# 29	Gunfighter Breed	Nelson C. Nye	1950	
# 30	Portrait Of Love	Margaret Nichols	1950	
# 31	The Golden Feather	Theda Kenyon	1950	
# 32	Hollywood Mystery	Ben Hecht	1950	
# 33	Candle In The Morning	Helen Topping Miller	1950	
# 34	Mobtown Clipper	S.S. Rabi	1950	
# 35	Lush Valley	Patricia Campbell	1950	
# 36	Murder Over Broadway	Fred Malina	1950	
# 37	Amaru	R.D. Frisbie	1950	
# 38	Sherriff Of Yavisa	Charles H. Snow	1950	
# 39	Be Still My Love	June Truesdell	1950	
# 40	Pass Key To Murder	Blair Reed	1950	
# 41	Panthers' Moon	Victor Canning	1950	
# 42	House In Harlem	Michael M. Scott	1950	
# 43	The Clean-Up	Joe Barry	1950	
# 44	The So Blue Marble	Dorothy B. Hughes	1950	
# 45	Night And The City	Gerald Kersh	1950	
# 46	Fair Stranger	Cecile Gilmore	1950	
# 47	Registered Nurse	Carl Sturdy	1950	
# 48	Poldrate Street	Garnett Weston	1950	
# 49	Weep Not Fair Lady	John Evans	1950	
# 50	One Way Street	Joseph McCord	1950	
# 51	The Pocket Purity Cook Book	None Listed	1950	
# 52	Livre De Cuisine Purity Petit Format	Translated by Rose Lacroix	1950	
# 53	The Pale Blonde Of Sands Street	William Chapman White	1950	
# 54	Speak Of The Devil	Elisabeth S. Holding	1950	
# 55	Mr. Sandeman Loses His Life	Eugene Healy	1950	
# 56	The Mayor Of Cote St.Paul	Ronald J. Cooke	1950	
# 57	Murder Man	William Bogart	1950	
# 58	Outposts Of Vengeance	E.E. Halleran	1950	
# 59	Cardinal Rock	Richard Sale	1950	
# 60	Lady Killer	Elisabeth S. Holding	1950	
# 61	Shadow Of The Badlands	E.E. Halleran	1950	
# 62	Message From A Corpse	Sam Merwin, Jr.	1950	
# 63	The Dangerous Dead	William Brandon	1950	
# 64	Sinister Warning	Michael M. Scott	1950	
# 65	Bridewell Beauty	H.M.E. Clamp	1950	
# 66	Royce Of The Royal Mounted	Amos Moore	1950	
# 67	Criss Cross	Don Tracy	1950	
# 68	The Queen City Murder Case	William G. Bogart	1950	
# 69	Payoff In Black	William G. Schofield	1950	
# 70	Knife In My Back	Sam Merwin, Jr.	1950	
# 71	Bouquet Knitter's Guide	None listed	1950	
# 72	Night Of Terror	Joy Brown	1950	
# 73	The King Of Thunder Valley	Archie Joscelyn	1950	
# 74	Spider House	F. Van Wyck Mason	1950	
# 75	Maverick Guns	J. E. Grinstead	1950	
# 76	The Corpse Came Back	Amelia Reynolds Long	1950	
# 77	A Night At Club Bagdad	Owen Fox Jerome	1950	
# 78	Rink Rat	Don MacMillan	1950	
# 79	Lazarus #7	Richard Sale	1950	
# 80	Case Of The Six Bullets	R. M. Laurenson	1950	
# 81	Idaho	Paul E. Lehman	1950	
# 82	The Cold Trail	Paul E. Lehman	1950	
# 83	Fall Guy	Joe Barry	1950	
# 84	The Triple Cross	Joe Barry	1950	
# 85	She Died On The Stairway	Knight Rhoades	1950	
# 86	Double Life	Owen Fox Jerome	1950	
# 87	Murder In Miniatures	Sam Merwin, Jr.	1950	
# 88	Renegade Ramrod	Leslie Ernenwein	1950	
# 89	The Faro Kid	Leslie Ernenwein	1950	
# 90	The Widow Gay	A. A. Marcus	1950	
