= Galaxy Science Fiction Novels =

- Parent company: Galaxy Science Fiction
- Status: Defunct
- Founded: 1950
- Country of origin: United States
- Headquarters location: New York City
- Publication types: Books
- Fiction genres: Science fiction

Galaxy novels, sometimes titled Galaxy Science Fiction Novels, were a series of mostly reprint American science fiction novels published between 1950 and 1961.

The series was started by H.L. Gold, the editor of Galaxy Science Fiction, in 1950 as a companion to the main Galaxy magazine. There was one (often abridged) novel per issue, which appeared in digest size format, which made the books in the series look like digest magazines.

In 1959, after 35 issues, the series was sold to Beacon Books, which changed the format to mass-market (small size) paperback and introduced its own numbering scheme, continuing the series for another 11 issues. They also had the contents of some books revised to add mild sexual content and changed their titles accordingly.

== Publication details ==
The official publisher of Galaxy novels was World Editions, Inc. for issues 1 through 7 and Galaxy Publishing Corp. for issues 8 through 46. Both were based in New York City. Issues 1 through 23, 32, 33, and then 35 through 46 were published as Galaxy Science Fiction Novel while issues 24 through 31 and 34 were published as Galaxy Novel. Fred Pohl, who was editor of Galaxy Publishing Co. from 1960-1969, stated in 1967 that the book series showed a loss of $30,000 (equivalent to $282,904 in 2024) between 1950 and 1958.

== List of issues ==
1. 1950 Eric Frank Russell. Sinister Barrier (1943)
2. 1950 Jack Williamson. The Legion of Space (1947)
3. 1951 Arthur C. Clarke. Prelude to Space (1951)
4. 1951 S. Fowler Wright. The Amphibians (1925)
5. 1951 S. Fowler Wright. The World Below (1949)
6. 1951 Raymond F. Jones. The Alien (1951)
7. 1951 Clifford D. Simak. Empire (1951)
8. 1952 Olaf Stapledon. Odd John (1936)
9. 1952 William F. Temple. Four Sided Triangle (1949)
10. 1952 Jay Franklin. Rat Race (1950)
11. 1952 Wilson Tucker. The City in the Sea (1951)
12. 1952 Sam Merwin, Jr. The House of Many Worlds (1951)
13. 1953 John Taine. Seeds of Life (1953)
14. 1953 Isaac Asimov. Pebble in the Sky (1950)
15. 1953 Leslie Mitchell. Three Go Back (1932)
16. 1953 James Blish. The Warriors of Day (1953)
17. 1953 Lewis Padgett. Well of the Worlds (1952 in Startling Stories, March 1952)
18. 1953 Edmond Hamilton. City at World's End (1951)
19. 1953 James Blish. Jack of Eagles (1952)
20. 1954 Murray Leinster. The Black Galaxy (1949)
21. 1954 Jack Williamson. The Humanoids (1949, expansion of "With Folded Hands...", in Astounding Science Fiction July 1947)
22. 1954 Sam Merwin, Jr. Killer To Come (1953)
23. 1954 David Reed. Murder in Space
24. 1955 L. Sprague de Camp. Lest Darkness Fall (1939–1941)
25. 1955 Murray Leinster. The Last Spaceship
26. 1956 Lewis Padgett. Chessboard Planet
27. 1956 Malcolm Jameson. Tarnished Utopia (1956, originally in Startling Stories, March 1942)
28. 1957 Fritz Leiber. Destiny Times Three
29. 1957 Ron Hubbard. Fear
30. 1957 Fletcher Pratt. Double Jeopardy
31. 1957 C.L. Moore. Shambleau
32. 1957 F.L. Wallace. Address: Centauri
33. 1958 Hal Clement. Mission of Gravity
34. 1958 Manly Wade Wellman. Twice in Time
35. 1958 Frank Riley and Mark Clifton. The Forever Machine
36. 1959 (236) Olaf Stapledon. Odd John (1936, second time, see above)
37. 1959 (242) Raymond F. Jones. The Deviates
38. 1959 (256) George O. Smith. Troubled Star
39. 1959 (263) Laurence Janifer (as "Larry M. Harris") and Randall Garrett. Pagan Passions
40. 1960 (270) Poul Anderson. Virgin Planet
41. 1960 (277) Philip José Farmer. Flesh (1960)
42. 1960 (284) Sam Merwin, Jr. The Sex War (1960, expansion of "The White Widows" in Startling Stories, October 1953)
43. 1960 (291) Philip José Farmer. A Woman A Day (1960, expansion of "Moth and Rust" in June 1953 Startling Stories)
44. 1960 (298) A. E. van Vogt, The Mating Cry (1960, revision of The House That Stood Still, 1950)
45. 1961 (305) Brian Aldiss, The Male Response (1961)
46. 1961 (312) Cyril Judd. Sin in Space (1952, originally as Outpost Mars)
