= Sam Merwin Jr. =

American novelist

Samuel Kimball Merwin Jr.
- Born: April 28, 1910; Plainfield, New Jersey, U.S.
- Died: January 13, 1996 (aged 85); Los Angeles, California, U.S.
- Occupations: Writer, editor
- Spouse: Lee Anna Vance
- Relatives: Samuel Merwin Sr.
- Writing career
- Pen name: Elizabeth Deare Bennett, Matt Lee, Jacques Jean Ferrat, Carter Sprague
- Genres: Science fiction, mystery

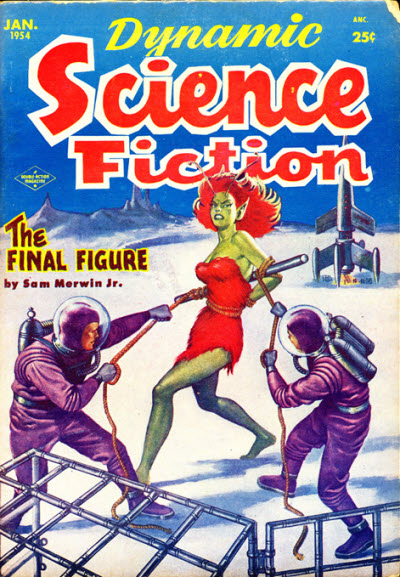
Merwin's novelette "The Final Figure" was the cover story for the final issue of Dynamic Science Fiction in 1954

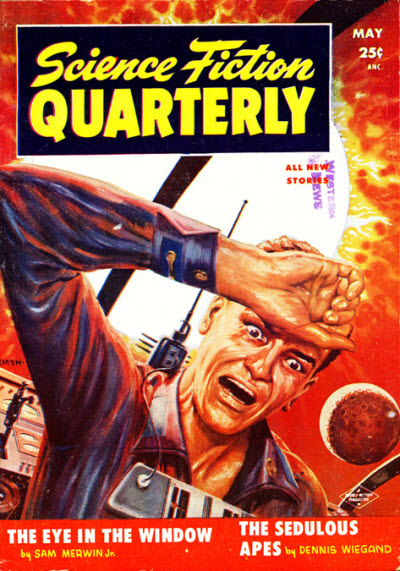
Merwin's novelette "The Eye in the Window" was cover-featured on the May 1955 issue of Science Fiction Quarterly

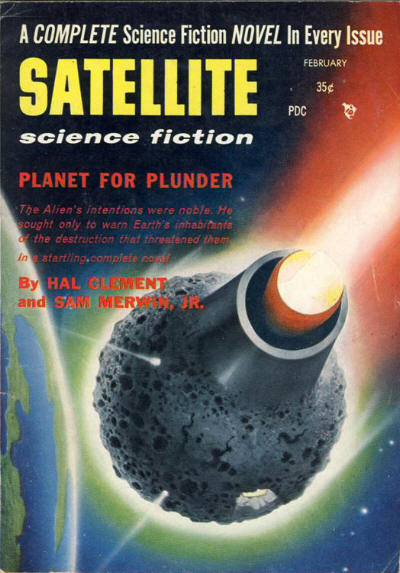
Merwin added 10,000 words to Clement's novella "Planetfall" for its publication in the February 1957 issue of Satellite Science Fiction as "Planet for Plunder", under both authors' bylines

Samuel Kimball Merwin Jr. (April 28, 1910 - January 13, 1996) was an American mystery fiction writer, editor and science fiction author. His pseudonyms included Elizabeth Deare Bennett, Matt Lee, Jacques Jean Ferrat and Carter Sprague.

== Biography ==
He was born on April 28, 1910, in Plainfield, New Jersey, to Samuel Merwin Sr. He received a BA from Princeton in 1931 and studied at the Boston Museum School of Fine Arts. He began his career in mainstream journalism - as a reporter for the Boston Evening America (1932–1933) then as the New York City Bureau chief for The Philadelphia Inquirer. His career continued as an editor (Dell publishing Co. 1937–1938, Standard Magazines Group 1941–1951, King Size Publications (1952), Renown Publications (1955–1956, 1977–1979) and Brandon House (1966–1967) and as a magazine writer.

In 1934 he married Lee Anna Vance.

Merwin began publishing fiction in 1940 with the mystery novel, Murder in Miniatures, and wrote mysteries, romance (under female pseudonyms), sports fiction, and science fiction. Overall, he produced more mystery writing than science fiction writing and his science fiction is said to show the influence of the mystery genre. However he was most influential in the science fiction genre, as the editor of Startling Stories (1945–1951) Fantastic Story Quarterly (1950–1951), Wonder Stories Annual (1950–1951), Thrilling Wonder Stories (1945–1951) and Fantastic Universe (1953). At first he was billed as Sergeant Saturn, a pseudonym inherited from Oscar J. Friend, the magazines' previous editor, and then simply as "Editor". His identity remained unknown to most readers for six years, which helped make his magazines' letters department one of the liveliest and best regarded in the field. He has been credited with raising the standard of published science fiction and of moving it more towards an adult readership.

Merwin quit his editing job in 1951 to become a freelance writer, but his mysteries and science fiction books were only moderately successful, either commercially or critically. During the science fiction boom of 1953 he briefly edited Fantastic Universe, and he was an associate editor of Galaxy Science Fiction in 1952–1953.

Three of his detective stories had as an investigator Amy Brewster "a cigar-smoking, 300-pound lawyer-financier...Upper class but unfeminine" who solved mysteries for her friends. This character has been said to be "defined against the genre's stereotypes, particularly the femme fatale: they are not attractive, not home-bound, and not submissive, either conversationally or professionally".

He wrote a few comic book stories for DC's Strange Adventures and Mystery in Space that were published from 1952 to 1953.

He also edited the Mike Shayne Mystery Magazine in 1956, returning to edit it from 1977 to 1979. He wrote many of the Michael Shayne stories that appeared in the magazine

He died on January 13, 1996, Los Angeles, California.

== Legacy ==
Merwin is probably best remembered today for the alternate worlds novel The House of Many Worlds (1951) and its sequel, Three Faces of Time (1955). Boucher and McComas, although faulting its ending, characterized The House of Many Worlds as "admirably handled. . . . the writing is the best that Merwin has yet published.". P. Schuyler Miller praised the novel as "roundly entertaining [and] firmly plotted [and] fully packed with all sorts of neat little bits of color and detail. Groff Conklin, however, reviewed House as "rather disappointing," citing its "hasty writing and unfortunate characterizations".

== Works ==
=== The House of Many Worlds ===
1. The House of Many Worlds in Startling Stories, September 1951
  - Expanded: The House of Many Worlds, Doubleday, 1951
  - Reprint: Galaxy novel No. 12, 1952
2. "Journey to Misenum", Startling Stories, August 1953
  - Expanded as: Three Faces of Time, Ace Double D-121, 1955
3. Both novels collected as The House of Many Worlds, Ace, 1983

=== Amy Brewster detective novels ===
- Knife in My Back, New York, Mystery House, 1945
  - Reprint: Kingston, New York, Handi Book, 1945
  - Reprint: London, Quality Press Ltd, 1947
  - Reprint: New York/Toronto, Harlequin Books, 1950
- Message from a Corpse, 1945
- A Matter of Policy, 1947

=== Standalone novels ===
- Murder in Miniatures, Doubleday Doran, "Crime Club", 1940
  - Reprint: Crestwood Pub., "A Black Cat Detective Story", 1945
  - Reprint: New York/Toronto, Harlequin Books, 1950
  - Reprint: Sydney, Original Novels Foundation, "Phantom Books No. 645", 1955, 132p.
- The Creeping Shadow, Connecticut, Fawcett Gold Medal Books (227), 1952
- Killer to Come, Abelard Press, 1953
  - Reprint: Galaxy novels No. 22, 1954
- The White Widows, Doubleday, 1953 (expansion of "The White Widows" in Startling Stories, October 1953)
  - Slightly edited reprint: The Sex War, Beacon, Galaxy novel No. 42, 1960
- The Passer, New York, Midwood Tower, 1962
- The Time Shifters, New York, Lancer, 1971
- Chauvinisto, Canoga Park, CA, Major Books, 1976, ISBN 0-89041-085-2, 176p.
