= Galaxy Science Fiction =

American science fiction magazine (1950–1980)

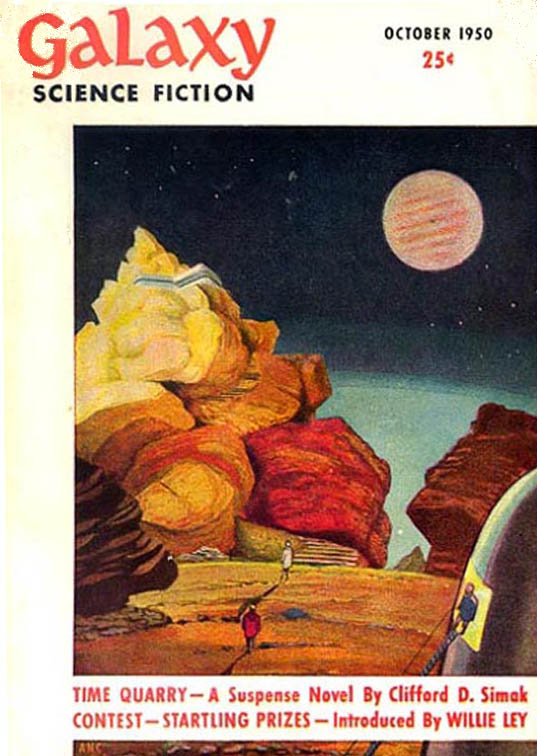
David Stone's cover for the first issue of Galaxy

Galaxy Science Fiction was an American digest-size science fiction magazine, published in Boston from 1950 to 1980. It was founded by World Editions, a French-Italian company looking to break into the American market. World Editions hired as editor H. L. Gold, who rapidly made Galaxy the leading science fiction magazine of its time, focusing on stories about social issues rather than technology.

Gold published many notable stories during his tenure, including Ray Bradbury's "The Fireman", later expanded as Fahrenheit 451; Robert A. Heinlein's The Puppet Masters; and Alfred Bester's The Demolished Man. In 1952, the magazine was acquired by Robert Guinn, its printer. By the late 1950s, Frederik Pohl was helping Gold with most aspects of the magazine's production. When Gold's health worsened, Pohl took over as editor, starting officially at the end of 1961, though he had been doing the majority of the production work for some time.

Under Pohl, Galaxy had continued success, regularly publishing fiction by writers such as Cordwainer Smith, Jack Vance, Harlan Ellison, and Robert Silverberg. Pohl never won the annual Hugo Award for his stewardship of Galaxy, winning three Hugos instead for its sister magazine, If. In 1969, Guinn sold Galaxy to Universal Publishing and Distribution Corporation (UPD) and Pohl resigned with Ejler Jakobsson replacing him. Under Jakobsson, the magazine declined in quality. It recovered under James Baen, who took over in mid-1974. However, when he left at the end of 1977, the deterioration resumed and there were financial problems, resulting in writers not being paid on time and the schedule becoming erratic. By the end of the 1970s, the gaps between issues were lengthening and the title was finally sold to Galileo publisher Vincent McCaffrey, who brought out only a single issue in 1980. A brief revival as a semi-professional magazine followed in 1994, edited by H. L. Gold's son, E. J. Gold. This lasted for eight bimonthly issues.

At its peak, Galaxy greatly influenced the science fiction genre. It was regarded as one of the leading science fiction magazines almost from the start, and its influence did not wane until Pohl's departure in 1969. Gold brought a "sophisticated intellectual subtlety" to magazine science fiction according to Pohl, who added that "after Galaxy it was impossible to go on being naive." SF historian David Kyle commented that "of all the editors in and out of the post-war scene, the most influential beyond any doubt was H. L. Gold." Kyle suggested that the new direction Gold set "inevitably" led to the experimental New Wave, the defining science fiction literary movement of the 1960s.

== Publication history ==
The first science fiction (sf) magazine, Amazing Stories, appeared in 1926. By the end of the 1930s, the genre was flourishing in the United States, but World War II and its resulting paper shortages led to the demise of several magazines. In the late 1940s, the market began to recover. From a low of eight active US magazines in 1946, the field expanded to 20 just four years later. Galaxy's appearance in 1950 was part of this boom. According to sf historian and critic Mike Ashley, its success was the main reason for a subsequent flood of new releases: 22 more science fiction magazines appeared by 1954, when the market dipped again as a side effect of US Senate hearings into the putative connection between comic books and juvenile delinquency.

=== Origins and 1950s ===
	Jan	Feb	Mar	Apr	May	Jun	Jul	Aug	Sep	Oct	Nov	Dec
1950										1/1	1/2	1/3
1951	1/4	1/5	1/6	2/1	2/2	2/3	2/4	2/5	2/6	3/1	3/2	3/3
1952	3/4	3/5	3/6	4/1	4/2	4/3	4/4	4/5	4/6	5/1	5/2	5/3
1953	5/4	5/5	5/6	6/1	6/2	6/3	6/4	6/5	6/6	7/1	7/2	7/3
1954	7/5	7/5-A	7/6	8/1	8/2	8/3	8/4	8/5	8/6	9/1	9/2	9/3
1955	9/4	9/5	9/6	10/1	10/2	10/3	10/4	10/5	10/6	11/1	11/2	
1956	11/3	11/4	11/5	11/6	12/1	12/2	12/3	12/4	12/5	12/6	13/1	13/2
1957	13/3	13/4	13/5	13/6	14/1	14/2	14/3	14/4	14/5	14/6	15/1	15/2
1958	15/3	15/4	15/5	15/6	16/1	16/2	16/3	16/4	16/5	16/6	17/1	17/2
1959		17/3		17/4		17/5		17/6		18/1		18/2
Issues of Galaxy from 1950 to 1959, showing volume/issue number. H. L. Gold was editor throughout the 1950s.

H. L. Gold, Galaxy's first editor, had worked at Standard Magazines in the early 1940s as an assistant editor, reading for Standard's three science fiction pulps: Startling Stories, Thrilling Wonder, and Captain Future. With the advent of the war, Gold left publishing and went into the army, but in late 1949 he was approached by Vera Cerutti, who had once worked for him. Cerutti was now working for a French-Italian publisher, Éditions Mondiales Del Duca founded by Cino Del Duca, that had opened an office in New York as World Editions. She initially asked Gold for guidance on how to produce a magazine, which he provided. World Editions took a heavy loss on Fascination, its first attempt to launch a US magazine, and Cerutti returned to Gold asking for recommendations for new titles. Gold knew about The Magazine of Fantasy & Science Fiction, a digest launched in the fall of 1949, but felt that there was still room in the market for another serious science fiction magazine. He sent a prospectus to World Editions that included a proposal for a series of paperback sf novels as well as a periodical, and proposed paying three cents a word, an impressively high rate, given that most competing magazines were paying only one cent a word. World Editions agreed, hired Gold as the editor, and the first issue appeared in October 1950. The novel series subsequently appeared as Galaxy Science Fiction Novels.

Gold initially suggested two titles for the magazine, If and Galaxy. Gold's art director, Washington Irving van der Poel, mocked up multiple layouts and Gold invited hundreds of writers, editors, artists, and fans to view them and vote for their favorite; the vote was strongly for Galaxy as the title. (Note: The distinctive cover lettering was designed by Frank Conley, the first husband of Gold's wife, Nicky.) For the first issue, Gold obtained stories by several well-known authors, including Isaac Asimov, Fritz Leiber, and Theodore Sturgeon, as well as part one of Time Quarry by Clifford D. Simak (later published in book form as Time and Again). Along with an essay by Gold, Galaxy's premiere issue introduced a book review column by anthologist Groff Conklin, which ran until 1955, and a Willy Ley science column. Gold sought to implement high-quality printing techniques, though the quality of the available paper was insufficient for the full benefits to be seen. Within months, the outbreak of the Korean War led to paper shortages that forced Gold to find a new printer, Robert M. Guinn. The new paper was of even lower quality, a disappointment to Gold. (Note: Gold's recollections of the change include a comment that only one issue was missed in making the switch to Guinn; this is presumably an error on his part, as Galaxy did not miss an issue till 1955.) According to Gold, the magazine was profitable within five issues: an "incredible" achievement, in his words.

In the summer of 1951, disagreements within World Editions led to attempts to disrupt Galaxy's distribution. According to Gold, the circulation director and the head of the American office stockpiled many issues instead of distributing them, and made sure that the ones that did get distributed went to areas of the United States, such as the South, where there was little or no audience for the magazine. (Note: Gold does not name the two men involved, but according to Galaxy's masthead during this period the president of World Editions was George A. Gogniat, and the circulation director (who was listed only from June through September 1951) was Frederick Allardt.) The head of the French office of World Editions came to the United States to find out what the problem was, and recommended that the magazine be sold to the two Americans, for $3,000—a very low price. They tried to recruit Gold, but he contacted the Italian office, which rejected the sale and eventually agreed to sell Galaxy to the printer, Robert M. Guinn. It was only after the sale was complete that the sabotaged distribution came to light; World Editions wanted to buy back the magazine, but Guinn quoted a price four times as high as he had paid. In Gold's words, "he, Guinn, knew what he was buying, whereas World Editions hadn't known what they were selling".

Guinn's new company was named Galaxy Publishing Corporation, and it took over beginning with the October 1951 issue. Gold remained as editor, but lost the assistance of staff at World Editions, relying instead on help from Jerome Bixby, Algis Budrys, Theodore Sturgeon, and Gold's wife, Evelyn Paige. Science fiction author Frederik Pohl, then working as a literary agent, was also helpful in connecting writers with Gold.

By the late 1950s, the science fiction magazine boom was over, and the relatively low circulation of the magazines did not endear them to distributors, the middlemen who transported magazines from the publishers to the newsstands and other outlets. Gold changed the title from Galaxy Science Fiction to Galaxy Magazine with the September 1958 issue, commenting that the term science fiction "scares many people away from buying". Galaxy's circulation, at about 90,000, was the highest of the science fiction magazines, but Guinn decided to cut costs, and in 1959 raised the cover price and changed the magazine to a bimonthly schedule, while increasing the page count. Guinn also cut the rates paid to authors from three (and occasionally four) cents a word to one and a half cents a word. These changes saved Galaxy over $12,000 a year. The result was a fall in circulation to about 80,000 within two years, but this was sustainable because of the savings from the fiction budget. (Note: According to critic and author Kingsley Amis, in his survey of science fiction published in 1960, Galaxy had a circulation of 125,000 at the time he was writing, which does not match Ashley's figures. Amis gives no source for his number.)

=== 1960s ===
	Jan	Feb	Mar	Apr	May	Jun	Jul	Aug	Sep	Oct	Nov	Dec
1960		18/3		18/4		18/5		18/6		19/1		19/2
1961		19/3		19/4		19/5		19/6		20/1		20/2
1962		20/3		20/4		20/5		20/6		21/1		21/2
1963		21/3		21/4		21/5		21/6		22/1		22/2
1964		22/3		22/4		22/5		22/6		23/1		23/2
1965		23/3		23/4		23/5		23/6		24/1		24/2
1966		24/3		24/4		24/5		24/6		25/1		25/2
1967		25/3		25/4		25/5		25/6		26/1		26/2
1968		26/3		26/4		26/5	26/6	27/1	27/2	27/3	27/4	27/5
1969	27/6	28/1	28/2	28/3	28/4		28/5	128/6	129/1	129/2	129/3	29/4
Issues of Galaxy from 1960 to 1969, showing volume/issue number. Issues are color-coded to show when each editor was in charge; the editorship passed from H.L. Gold to Frederik Pohl and then to Ejler Jakobsson during the 1960s. Note that the apparent error in volume numbering in late 1969 is in fact correct.

Guinn acquired If, another science fiction magazine, in 1959, and gave it to Gold to edit as well. The July 1959 issue of If was the first under Gold's editorship. Galaxy's shift to a bimonthly schedule had been intended to help reduce the workload on Gold, who was not in good health; he was able to take on If as well because the two magazines alternated months of publication. Towards the end of the 1950s Frederik Pohl began to help Gold, occasionally to the extent of performing all the editorial duties, including writing the editorials and blurbs and working with the printer. Gold, who was agoraphobic, was making efforts at this time to leave his apartment, but in 1960 he was seriously injured in a taxi accident, and proved unable to continue as editor. Pohl took over at some point in early 1961, though he was not listed on the masthead as editor until the December 1961 issue.

Pohl attempted to persuade Guinn to double the pay rate of one and a half cents a word back to the former level of three. Guinn refused, but Pohl was able to find enough material that he could purchase at a low rate to allow him to offer some authors three cents per word. The strategy was successful in improving circulation, and Guinn eventually acceded to the rate increase.

Pohl also tried hard to persuade Guinn and Sol Cohen, whom Guinn had hired to help with the publishing duties, to switch both Galaxy and If to monthly schedules. In late 1962, they agreed, but soon changed their minds and decided to start a third science fiction magazine instead. This was Worlds of Tomorrow, which was launched in April 1963 and lasted until mid-1967 (it was briefly revived in 1970–71). Another companion magazine, International Science Fiction, was tried in late 1967, but lasted only two issues; it showcased stories translated from other languages, and sales were very weak. Finally, in 1968 Guinn launched Worlds of Fantasy, edited initially by Lester del Rey, Galaxy's managing editor; only four issues appeared. In the middle of 1968, Galaxy was restored to a monthly schedule.

=== 1970s and after ===
In 1969, Guinn sold Galaxy to Universal Publishing and Distribution Corporation (UPD). Pohl was in Rio de Janeiro at a World Science Fiction Symposium when the sale went through; he heard the news when he returned to the Galaxy office afterwards and within a few days decided to resign. (Note: Pohl reports in his autobiography that his final decision to resign was precipitated by hearing that the new publisher, Arnie Abramson, insisted that the magazine's editor be in the office from nine to five every day.) He remained on the masthead as "editor emeritus", a post invented to keep Pohl from moving to one of the other sf magazines, and went back to his writing career. His place was taken by Ejler Jakobsson, who was working in UPD's book department. Lester del Rey stayed on as features editor, and Judy-Lynn Benjamin took his place as managing editor. Jack Gaughan was made art editor.

Galaxy's circulation had held relatively steady in the mid-1960s, ranging between 73,000 and 78,000, but the UPD acquisition coincided with a precipitous drop—from 75,300 for the year ended October 1968, circulation fell to 51,479 just one year later. Difficulties with distribution also cut into income, and Arnold Abramson, UPD's owner, decided to cut costs and maximize profits. Galaxy went bimonthly in August 1970, ending a two-year spell of monthly scheduling (though a couple of months had been missed). The page count, which had been cut from 196 to 160 when UPD bought it, was increased again, and the price was raised from 60 cents to 75 cents. A British edition began in May 1972, published by Tandem Books, which was owned by UPD. The net effect of all these changes was a substantial increase in profitability. Circulation in 1972 also rose by about 6,000 issues, though it is possible that this was solely due to the new British edition.

	Jan	Feb	Mar	Apr	May	Jun	Jul	Aug	Sep	Oct	Nov	Dec
1970		29/5	29/6	30/1	30/2	30/3	30/4	30/5		30/6		31/1
1971	31/2	31/3	31/4	31/5	31/6		32/1		32/2		32/3	
1972	32/4		32/5		32/6		33/1		33/2		33/3	
1973	33/4		33/5		33/6		34/7		34/8	34/1	34/2	34/3
1974	34/4	34/5	34/6	34/7	35/5	35/6	35/7	35/8	35/9	35/10	35/11	35/12
1975	36/1	36/2	36/3	36/4		36/5	36/6	36/7	36/8	36/9		
1976	37/1	37/2	37/3		37/4		37/5		37/6	37/7	37/8	37/9
1977			38/1	38/2	38/3	38/4	38/5	38/6	38/7	38/8	38/9	39/1
1978		39/2	39/3	39/4	39/5	39/6			39/7		39/8	
1979			39/9			39/10			39/11			
1980							40/1					
1994	1/1		1/2		1/3		1/4		1/5		1/6	
1995	2/1		2/2									
Issues of Galaxy from 1970 to the last issue, including the revival in 1994, showing volume/issue number; the apparent errors at July and September 1973, and the odd numbering of volume 35, are in fact correctly shown. The editors, in sequence, were Ejler Jakobsson, James Baen, J.J. Pierce, Hank Stine, Floyd Kemske, and E.J. Gold.

UPD began to have financial difficulties in the early 1970s, and when Judy-Lynn del Rey (formerly Judy-Lynn Benjamin) left in May 1973 to work at Ballantine Books, Jakobsson's workload increased greatly. He resigned less than a year later, citing overwork and other issues, and was replaced by James Baen, who took over with the June 1974 issue after Pohl declined the post. Baen also took over the editorship of If, but rising paper costs forced the closure of If at the end of 1974, and the title was merged with Galaxy. The magazine had returned to a monthly schedule in September 1973, but it was only patchily adhered to, with at least a couple of issues missed every year except 1974. Baen was successful at increasing circulation again, bringing it from 47,789 when he took over to 81,035 when he left. The magazine was profitable for UPD, but the financial pressure on the parent company took its toll and Baen left in late 1977 to work for Ace Books—the October issue was his last.

Baen was replaced by John J. Pierce, but the situation only worsened. Pierce resigned within a year: the company was in increasing debt, and his office assistant recalls that the office appeared inefficiently run, though he commented that Pierce "clearly loved what he did and knew what he was talking about". Pierce's replacement was Hank Stine, who took over in late 1978, though because of Galaxy's irregular schedule Pierce's last issue was March–April 1979. Stine managed to produce only two more issues, June–July 1979 and September–October 1979, before UPD's financial problems spelled the end. Rights to the title were transferred to a new company, Galaxy Magazine, Inc., owned by Vincent McCaffrey, proprietor of Avenue Victor Hugo, a second-hand book store in Boston; UPD retained a ten percent interest in order to receive income from future sales to pay off their debts. Stine had compiled two more issues, but neither ever appeared; McCaffrey, who had also launched a separate magazine, Galileo, had cash-flow problems that prevented him from distributing the magazine as he had planned. One more issue did finally appear from McCaffrey, in July 1980, in a large format; it was edited by Floyd Kemske. A subsequent issue, to be dated October 1980, was assembled, but never distributed.

The last few years of Galaxy's life were marked by stories of unpaid contributors. John Varley, for example, reported that he was still owed money for his stories five years after they appeared. Submissions from well-known writers fell away, and the lack of financial support from UPD meant that the pay rate was an unattractive one cent per word. Higher postal rates, higher paper costs, and continuing competition from the paperback science fiction market all added to the pressure on Galaxy. These problems were not resolved by the sale to McCaffrey, who did not even have enough money to pay for circulation postage, with the result that not every Galaxy subscriber received a copy of the final issue. Frederik Pohl places the blame for Galaxy's demise on Arnie Abramson, who, Pohl contends, "simply did not perform [the] basic functions of a publisher": paying the authors, ensuring subscribers received copies, and meeting other obligations.

== Relaunches of the magazine ==
In 1994, the magazine reappeared briefly as a semi-professional publication under the editorship of E. J. Gold, son of H. L. Gold. E. J. Gold produced eight issues on a regular bimonthly schedule, starting with the January–February 1994 issue, and ending with March–April 1995.

In August 2024, Starship Sloane Publishing relaunched Galaxy Science Fiction with Justin T. O'Conor Sloane serving as editor, Jean-Paul L. Garnier as deputy editor, Daniel Pomarède as science editor and Robert Silverberg as a contributing editor. The first issue featured cover art by Bruce Pennington, with new fiction by David Gerrold and Christopher Ruocchio among other notables.

== Contents and reception ==
=== Early years ===
Gold intended Galaxy to publish stories of sufficient literary quality to attract readers of the slick magazines, as well as those who came to Galaxy already familiar with genre science fiction. His editorial policy was broader than that of John W. Campbell, the editor of the leading magazine in the field, Astounding Science Fiction: Gold was interested in sociology, psychology, and other "soft" sciences, and was also willing to publish humorous and satirical stories. Gold managed to persuade the publisher to let him offer three to four cents a word, which exceeded the highest rates paid in the field at that time. (Note: Initially the rate was three cents on acceptance; Astounding sometimes paid three cents a word, but only as a bonus rate. By 1953 the rate went as high as four cents a word for writers who appeared regularly. Astounding soon matched Galaxy's rates.) In addition to the high rates, Galaxy was an attractive market for writers because Gold bought only first magazine rights, unlike the other leading magazines. Galaxy was quickly established as one of the three leading science fiction magazines, along with Campbell's Astounding and The Magazine of Fantasy and Science Fiction (usually abbreviated to F&SF). Campbell had been enormously influential over the previous decade, but the appearance of Galaxy and F&SF, launched just a year before, marked the end of his dominance of the genre.

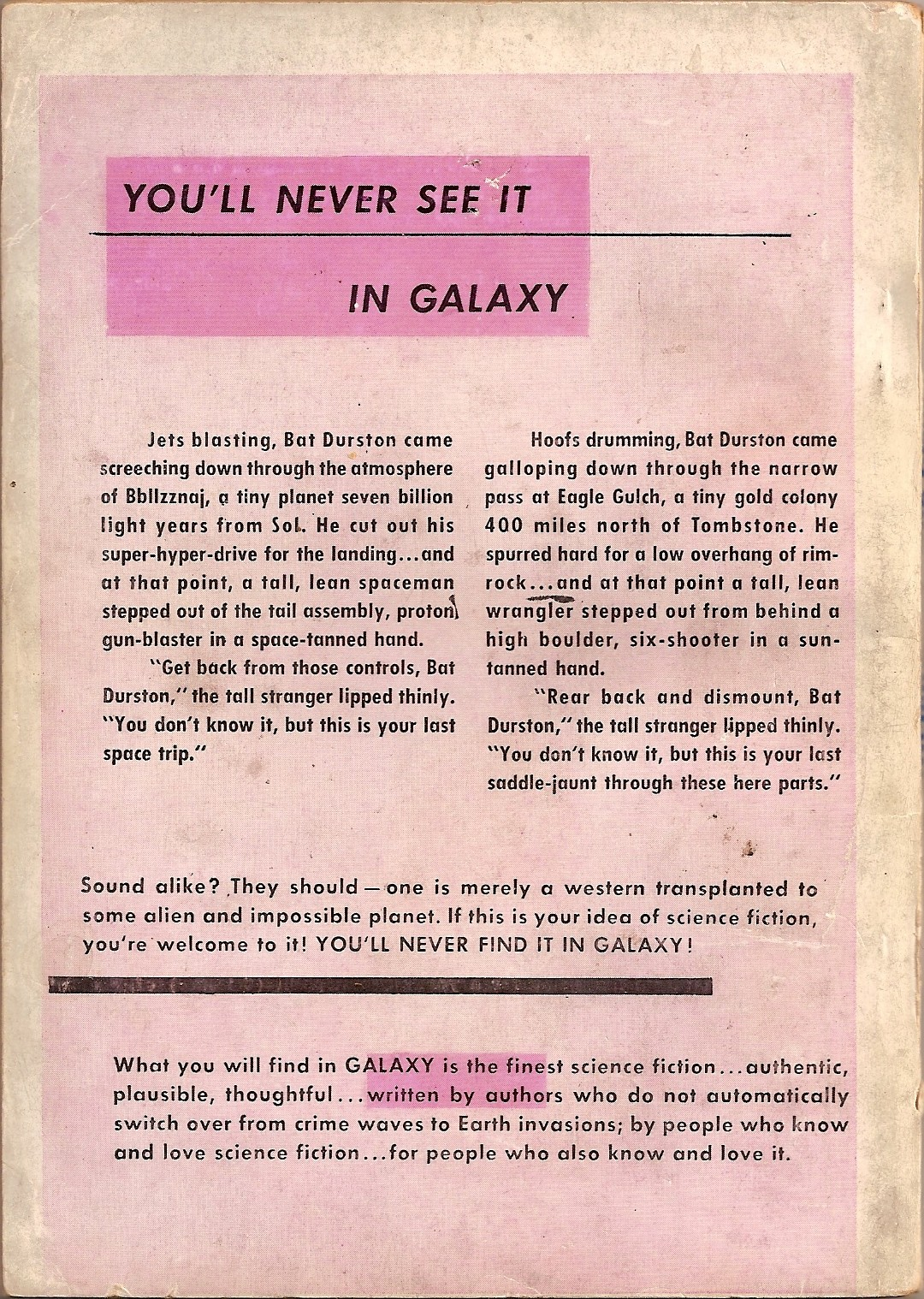
Rear cover of first issue

The cover for the first issue was by David Stone, depicting a scene from Simak's Time Quarry. The image was muted, in contrast to the sensational art typically found on the covers of the sf pulps; the intention was that Galaxy should look like an sf magazine, but one "that you were not embarrassed to hold", in the words of Mike Ashley. The early artwork was generally unremarkable, though Ed Emshwiller's humorous cover for the June 1951 issue, his first professional sale as an artist, was a positive sign. "Emsh", as he was known to science fiction readers, soon became a regular contributor. The relatively expensive production processes that Gold had insisted on enabled more sophisticated internal artwork, which could be integrated with type in ways not possible with cheaper letterpress printing.

On the rear cover of the first issue, Gold ran a feature called "You'll Never See It In Galaxy!", with two paragraphs side by side—one a parody of the introduction to a space western, the other the same story translated to become a true western, with spaceships replaced by horses. A sample: "He cut out his super-hyper-drive for the landing ... and at that point, a tall, lean spaceman stepped out of the tail assembly, proton gun-blaster in a space-tanned hand" became "He spurred hard for a low overhang of rimrock ... and at that point a tall, lean wrangler stepped out from behind a high boulder, six-shooter in a sun-tanned hand". The feature drew much attention, though James Blish commented that Galaxy did not always avoid printing the kind of fiction it parodied.

In the first issue, Gold asked for reader feedback on what should be included in the magazine—letters, editorials, book reviews, or other features. The response was against a letter column, (Note: According to Gold, there were 6,000 letters from readers, 85 percent of which were against a letter column.) but the readers wanted editorials, and short book reviews with recommendations that would help them identify what books to buy, as opposed to in-depth criticism. Gold was also concerned that harsh critical reviews would scare away new authors who might otherwise submit their work. Groff Conklin began a book review column, called "Galaxy's Five Star Shelf", in the first issue; (Note: Conklin's column appeared in every issue until October 1955 except those of March 1951 and April and August 1955.) Floyd Gale took it over with the November 1955 issue—Gale was in fact Gold's brother, using a slightly modified surname. The inaugural issue also included a competition for readers to explain UFOs in under 200 words, the first of many contests Gold would run.

The first six issues contained stories by well-known authors, including some that became highly regarded such as Fritz Leiber's "Coming Attraction", Damon Knight's "To Serve Man", and Ray Bradbury's "The Fireman", later expanded as Fahrenheit 451. Gold considered these early issues exploratory, and some of the material by major names was clearly lesser work. With its second volume, beginning in April 1951, Galaxy achieved consistently high quality, with virtually every issue featuring a story that would have a lasting reputation, including C. M. Kornbluth's "The Marching Morons", Wyman Guin's "Beyond Bedlam", and Robert Heinlein's The Puppet Masters, whose serialization overlapped volumes 2 and 3. Early feedback from readers had been opposed to serialized novels, but here Gold did not follow their opinion, and Galaxy is remembered for featuring some very successful serials. A contemporary anthology of science fiction stories, E. F. Bleiler and T. E. Dikty's The Best Science Fiction Stories: 1951, commented in an editorial that Gold's work "will succeed in placing science-fiction on an equal basis with any other field of modern literature". With a circulation of over 100,000 in its second year, Galaxy surpassed Astounding.

=== Mid- and late 1950s ===
Gold maintained Galaxy's high standards for most of the 1950s. Alfred Bester's The Demolished Man—according to critic Peter Nicholls, "among the few genuine classics of genre sf"—was serialized in early 1952. Pohl and Kornbluth's The Space Merchants followed a few months later, serialized as Gravy Planet; Brian Aldiss, in his critical genre study Trillion Year Spree, calls it "one of the most famous books in SF". James Blish's "Surface Tension" and Theodore Sturgeon's "Baby is Three", both widely acclaimed, also appeared in 1952. Readers had expressed support for science articles, and in March 1952, Willy Ley, who had contributed occasional essays since the first issue, began a column, "For Your Information", in which he replied to readers' scientific questions. Running uninterrupted until Ley's death in 1969, Frederik Pohl describes it as "the most popular single feature Galaxy ever had". The Hugo Awards were inaugurated the following year: The Demolished Man won the first Hugo for Best Novel and Galaxy shared the first Hugo for Best Magazine with Astounding.

Gold published a wide range of material, and Galaxy became known for irony and satire; the work of authors able to adopt the wry style he favored, such as Knight and Robert Sheckley, appeared regularly in the magazine and were obvious commentaries on contemporary society. In 1953, with McCarthyism at its height, Gold refused to publish "The Liberation of Earth", a story by William Tenn satirizing both the Russian and American sides in the Korean War. Tenn quotes Gold, an ex-radical, as saying the idea made him "sweat green", though the year before he had published Isaac Asimov's "The Martian Way", a thinly veiled anti-McCarthy story.

L. Sprague de Camp commented that Gold "sets an extremely high standard of literary excellence for his writers", and observed that he often demanded multiple revisions and rewrites. Gold was also infamous for making sweeping changes to the stories he printed. (Note: Damon Knight described this habit of Gold's who, he wrote, "can no more keep from interfering with another man's story, once he owns it, than a saucer-eyed kid with a jam jar". William Tenn relates that Sturgeon became so annoyed by Gold's changes that he took to writing "STET" in the margin of every page of his manuscripts. Pohl and Kornbluth once took revenge on Gold for this habit by extensively changing, to the point of parody, a manuscript of Gold's for a book they were editing, and returning it to him as if that were the version to be published. However, Lester del Rey records that Gold agreed not to edit his stories without discussing the changes first, and that the agreement was kept.) In meetings and in phone calls he became well known as a difficult editor whose determination to achieve perfection sometimes alienated his writers. (Note: Isaac Asimov, in his memoirs, describes Gold as becoming "crankier as time went on", with his rejections "becoming increasingly personal and vilifying". James Gunn, in his history of science fiction, says that Gold's rejection letters were "long [and] savage", and that over time his tone became even more acid: "it was not enough to reject, the author had to be punished so that he would never sin again".) He was unapologetic, declaring, "I worked hard with writers, and they didn't always enjoy it". The results were often very positive: some successful stories are said to have begun with an idea he provided to one of his authors. In the case of The Demolished Man, his involvement extended almost to the point of collaboration. (Note: Gold spent four hours on the phone with Bester every week for a year and a half talking about the book; Bester took only three months to write it at the end of the process.) Gold was agoraphobic and rarely left his apartment, but writers often visited him, and he held regular parties and weekly poker games; in addition to the members of the science fiction community, the avant-garde composer John Cage often attended.

In March 1953 Gold announced a novel-writing contest, but it failed to attract any usable submissions. He asked Pohl and Kornbluth if they would allow him to print Gladiator-at-Law, which they had just completed, under a pseudonym, so he could claim that the contest had found a new talent. They refused, but shortly afterwards Pohl and Lester del Rey agreed to let Gold take their recently completed novel Preferred Risk and publish it as the winner under the pseudonym Edson McCann. Pohl and del Rey constructed a fake identity for McCann, but the news leaked out and Gold never ran another fiction competition. In July 1953, he launched a companion magazine, Beyond Fantasy Fiction, dedicated to fantasy material, which Galaxy's editorial policy did not favor. It lasted for ten bimonthly issues, with the final one appearing in January 1955. After it failed, Gold opened Galaxy to more fantasy, publishing writers such as Cordwainer Smith.

The ABC radio series Tales of Tomorrow, which began in 1952 as an offshoot of the TV series of the same name, used stories from Galaxy; the connection was announced at the start of each of its fifteen episodes. On April 24, 1955, another radio series, NBC's X Minus One, started a much longer run of 125 episodes, lasting until January 1958. From February 1956 onwards the scripts were adapted exclusively from stories in Galaxy, and from the April 1956 issue Galaxy ran advertisements for the series, which included work by Pohl, Sturgeon, and Philip K. Dick.

Through the 1950s, Galaxy's contributors routinely dominated the Hugo ballots, but neither the magazine nor the fiction it published won many awards, despite what sf historian Donald Lawler describes as its "deserved reputation for excellence". After several years of being shut out of the Hugos, Galaxy published two works in 1958 that won the honor: Fritz Leiber's novel The Big Time and Avram Davidson's short story "Or All the Seas with Oysters".

=== 1960s ===
Paid Circulation per Year
Year	Issues sold
1960	91,000
1961	91,000
1962	92,000
1963	77,677
1964	73,536
1965	73,610
1966	73,400
1967	74,700
1968	75,300
1969	51,479
1970	46,091
1971	45,598
1972	51,602
1973	54,524
1974	47,789
1975	56,361
1976	52,831
1977	81,035

When Pohl took over as editor in 1961, he broadened the magazine's scope, including more fantasy material. Regular contributors in the 1960s included Jack Vance, Larry Niven, Frank Herbert, Robert Silverberg, and Cordwainer Smith. Galaxy stories from this era that won awards include Vance's The Dragon Masters and "The Last Castle"; Clifford Simak's Way Station, serialized as Here Gather the Stars; Harlan Ellison's "'Repent, Harlequin,' Said the Ticktockman" and "The Beast That Shouted Love at the Heart of the World"; and Silverberg's "Nightwings". Pohl never succeeded in winning a Hugo Award as editor of Galaxy, although he won the award three consecutive times from 1966 to 1968 as editor of If, Galaxy's sister magazine, and in theory the junior of the two publications.

The quality of fiction in Galaxy had dipped towards the end of Gold's editorship, and Pohl worked hard to restore the magazine's high standards. Gold's difficult editorial personality had driven away some of his contributors, but Pohl, who had worked as an agent in the 1950s, was a central figure in the sf community and was able to attract submissions from the star writers of his day. In the case of one of these stars, he offered an unusual arrangement: Robert Silverberg could write whatever he wished and Pohl promised that he would almost invariably buy it. Silverberg, who had been a high-volume producer of competent but unremarkable science fiction, began writing more ambitious work as a result, much of which was published in Galaxy throughout the 1960s.

In February 1965, Pohl brought in Algis Budrys as book reviewer, after a year in which no review column had appeared. Budrys's insightful reviews drew much praise, and editor David Hartwell has ranked him as one of the best sf critics of his generation. (Note: The reviews were later collected in book form as Benchmarks (1985).)

The difference between Pohl's approach and Gold's was apparent in the editorials Pohl wrote, which were informal, entertaining, and rooted in his deep familiarity with the genre. With Pohl at the helm, Galaxy moved back toward the knowledgeable science fiction fan, and away from the mainstream market that Gold had targeted. Pohl said that he tried to "cover the full spectrum of science fiction", however, unlike Gold's "specialist magazine" of the 1950s; his Galaxy published both Sheckley's "Mindswap" and Herbert's "Do I Wake or Dream?" when Gold would not have purchased the latter, Pohl said.

=== 1970s ===
Ejler Jakobsson's tenure began with a large backlog of stories that Pohl had acquired, but within a year or two substantial changes were apparent. In the early 1970s, Jakobsson attempted to update Galaxy's image, adding a comic strip, "Sunpot", by Vaughn Bodé, for example. Theodore Sturgeon took over from Budrys as the regular book reviewer in January 1972 and held the post until mid-1975. Jakobsson did not manage to give Galaxy a new and distinctive character: "Sunpot" lasted only four issues, Sturgeon's reviews were undistinguished, and many of the new authors he published have been, in the words of Mike Ashley, "mercifully unknown ever since". The paper quality and printing quality also dropped, and early cover designs were very weak. Jakobsson initially printed guest editorials rather than writing his own; when he took over the editorial page his work was unremarkable. He managed to attract some of the new writers who were becoming well known in the sf scene, including George R.R. Martin, Joe Haldeman, and Joanna Russ. Three novels published in Jakobsson's Galaxy won awards: Isaac Asimov's The Gods Themselves and Arthur C. Clarke's Rendezvous with Rama each won both the Hugo and Nebula awards, in 1972 and 1973 respectively, and Robert Silverberg's A Time of Changes won the Nebula in 1971. Sturgeon's short story "Slow Sculpture" won both the Hugo and the Nebula in 1970.

A letter column was added at the end of 1971; this was the first time Galaxy had published reader's letters. Galaxy's long-time science columnist, Willy Ley, died in 1969, and was replaced by Donald Menzel. He was replaced in turn by Jerry Pournelle in April 1974.

Jakobsson's successor, James Baen, was able to publish some high-quality fiction, including material by Roger Zelazny, John Varley, Larry Niven, and Pohl, whose novel, Gateway, won both the Hugo and Nebula awards. Baen raised the level of the magazine substantially, and Ashley refers to his editorship as Galaxy's "Indian summer". Under Baen the review columnist was Spider Robinson, who won a Locus Award in 1977, primarily for his work in Galaxy. Baen also published a series of essays by authors discussing their own work. Apart from Gateway, Baen published only one award-winning story: Ursula K. Le Guin's "The Day Before the Revolution", which appeared in August 1974 and won the Nebula.

Baen's successors, Pierce, Stine, and Kemske, were unable to maintain his standard. Pohl remained loyal to the magazine, but the serialization of his novel Jem exemplified Galaxy's growing problems. Due to the magazine's increasingly erratic schedule, the serialization stretched from the last issue of 1978 into 1980, well after it had appeared in book form. In November 1977, Paul Walker took over the book column from Spider Robinson, and Jerry Pournelle left the science column at the end of 1978. The artwork quality dropped to an amateurish level, and despite the appearance of a few successful stories and novels, such as C. J. Cherryh's The Faded Sun: Kesrith, the overall quality was dramatically worse than it had been under Baen. Galaxy's deterioration was largely due to the financial troubles of the publisher, Arnold Abramson, who reduced the pay rate (at a time of high inflation) to a penny a word. Even that low rate did not guarantee timely disbursement, and many writers stopped submitting because of Galaxy's reputation for paying slowly, if at all. Costs were increasing for paper, postage, and production, and the paperback anthology market was booming, adding to the competition that Galaxy faced. Floyd Kemske's only issue never received newsstand distribution, doomed by the financial troubles of the magazine's publisher, Vincent McCaffrey.

=== Cover layout and artwork ===
Nine issues of Galaxy, showing the major variations in cover design over the magazine's lifetime

Galaxy had a characteristic cover style in the 1950s with an inverted white "L" shape (Greek gamma) framing the cover art; this style was copied by several magazines, including Authentic Science Fiction and Startling Stories. (Note: Other magazines that adopted this style were Science Fiction Adventures, Space Science Fiction, Orbit Science Fiction, and EC Comics' Weird Science-Fantasy.) When Astounding followed suit in late 1951, Gold commented sarcastically in an editorial that Galaxy "would like to know when we may have it [the format] back again". The first variation came with the September 1956 issue, which widened the left hand strip of white to allow room to print story titles and author names. The December 1961 issue was the first to eliminate the strip on the left, and until July 1969 the magazine varied between this layout, the inverted "L", and a version with no white at all, first used on the August 1965 issue. Another change visible in that issue is the reversal of the title coloring to white lettering on a block of red; this was used from August 1963 to December 1965. In August 1969 the title was enlarged to fill the width of the magazine; this issue had the white inverted "L", but it was the last one to do so till 1980. After August 1969 the cover paintings spanned the entire cover, though with some minor variations in layout such as can be seen in the October 1976 issue. Then in September 1978 (undated on the cover, but numbered vol. 39 no. 7) the original typeface for "Galaxy" was abandoned for the last few issues. The final issue, edited by Kemske, returned to the previous layout and typeface, although with a magazine twice the size of the original digest. When E. J. Gold revived Galaxy in 1994, he restored the inverted "L" and employed a predominantly black-and-white look for the eight issues he published.

Notable artists who contributed regularly to Galaxy included Ed Emshwiller, who won several Hugo Awards for his work, Hugo nominee Wallace Wood, and Jack Gaughan, who won three Hugos in the late 1960s, partly for his work in Galaxy. Gaughan was commissioned by Pohl to provide the cover and interior art for Jack Vance's The Dragon Masters in 1962; the resulting illustrations made Gaughan immediately famous in the science fiction field. In the 1950s and 1960s, Galaxy retained the original artwork sent in by its artists, though Emshwiller, much of whose best color work appeared there, was able to negotiate an exception to this rule, retaining the art for his portfolios. In 1972 much of this artwork—including both interior and cover illustrations—was sold off by Robert Guinn, who had kept it when he sold Galaxy to UPD in 1969.

=== Influence on the field ===
Isaac Asimov, in his memoirs, recalled being deeply impressed by the first issue of Galaxy, and that many fans, including himself, believed that the magazine became the field's leader almost immediately. In critic John Clute's assessment, Galaxy indeed swiftly supplanted Astounding and remained the leading magazine in the field until Pohl resigned as editor in 1969. Science fiction historian and critic Mike Ashley regarded Galaxy's success as the main reason for the subsequent boom in science fiction magazines, commenting that it "revolutionized the field overnight". Under Gold Galaxy provided a market for social science fiction stories that might not have been accepted by Astounding and Fantasy & Science Fiction, the other leading magazines.

Pohl stated in 1965 that almost every major science fiction writer whose career began after 1950 primarily wrote for Galaxy, and that others closely imitated Gold's magazine. He described Galaxy as where "the stunning new kinds of science fiction ... flowered, and changed everything in science fiction". In his opinion, Gold's innovation was to ask writers to consider not just new technology, but the subsequent impact of that technology on society. He adds, "What Galaxy brought to magazine science fiction was a kind of sophisticated intellectual subtlety. ... After Galaxy it was impossible to go on being naive." Science fiction author Brian Stableford argues that Galaxy quickly usurped Astounding's position as "pioneer of hardcore sf's progress" because it "embraced and gleefully pursued a new series of challenges to moral orthodoxy."

SF historian David Kyle ascribes Galaxy's influence specifically to Gold, saying that "of all the editors in and out of the post-war scene, the most influential beyond any doubt was H. L. Gold" and that the new direction he set led, "inevitably", to the New Wave, the celebrated science fiction literary movement of the 1960s. Kyle's assessment of Gold is echoed by writer Barry N. Malzberg, who calls Gold "perhaps the greatest editor in the history of all fields for the first half of his tenure". SF authors and historians Brian Aldiss and David Wingrove summarize Galaxy's history by saying that it lasted for "thirty mainly glorious years": it "brought into the sunlight a number of excellent satirists, comedians and ironists" and, through the influence of its reduced focus on technology, played an important role in attracting women to write science fiction.

== Publication details ==
=== Editors ===
The list below, and the charts above, follow the mastheads in the magazines. Because of Gold's poor health, Pohl was acting as editor for some time before he officially took over the role at the end of 1961.

- H. L. Gold (October 1950 – October 1961)
- Frederik Pohl (December 1961 – May 1969)
- Ejler Jakobsson (July 1969 – May 1974)
- James Baen (June 1974 – October 1977)
- John J. Pierce (November 1977 – March–April 1979)
- Hank Stine (June–July 1979 – September–October 1979)
- Floyd Kemske (Summer 1980)
- E. J. Gold (January-February 1994 – March-April 1995)
- Justin T. O'Conor Sloane (August 2024 –)

=== Overseas editions ===
Galaxy had multiple foreign editions. This was in part because the original publisher, World Editions, had a European base, which Gold had planned to take advantage of when the magazine launched. Overseas editions included:

- Argentina. Two magazines, Más Allá (June 1953 – June 1957) and Géminis (July 1965 – August 1965), reprinted stories primarily from Galaxy, though they also published some original material and some stories reprinted from other sources.
- Finland. Aikamme tieteislukemisto (August 1958 – December 1958) was a Finnish edition of Galaxy, edited by Mary A. Wuorio and published by Viikkosanomat Oy. (Note: Tuck states that there were four issues; according to Lawler there were five.)
- France. There were two separate French editions of Galaxy, both titled Galaxie. The first ran from November 1953 to April 1959 (a total of 65 issues), and was published by Editions OPTA, Paris. The first 11 issues were edited by Irina Orloff, the next 16 by Jacqueline Boissy, and the remainder by Jeannine Courtillet. The stories were badly translated, and printed in shortened form. Poor sales led to the cancellation of this version. The second version ran for 158 issues, from May 1964 to August–September 1977, and was also published by Editions OPTA. The editor was Alain Dorémieux for the first 67 issues, and Michel Demuth thereafter. This version, which contained original French stories as well as translated material from Galaxy, was much more successful and for a time outsold Fiction, the leading French science fiction magazine. From November 1974, more French authors were included, but publication ceased three years later when sales fell.
- Germany. Fifteen issues of a German version, titled Galaxis, was released from March 1958 to May 1959 by Moewig Verlag, Munich. The editor was Lothar Heinecke. Fourteen numbered paperbacks titled Galaxy appeared between 1965 and 1970, published by Heyne Verlag, Munich. The editor was Walter Ernsting, with Thomas Schlück as co-editor for the last five issues. The contents were reprints from the American edition.
- Italy. An Italian reprint edition titled Galaxy ran from June 1958 to May 1964; there were 70 physical issues, with two issues containing double numbers, so that the last issue was numbered 72. The publisher was Editrice Due Mondi, Milan, for the first ten issues; the remaining issues were published by Casa Editrice La Tribuna, Piacenza. The editors were R. Valente (issues 1–26/27), Mario Vitali (28/29–39), and Lella Pollini Rambelli (40–72). The magazine included some stories by Italian authors in addition to translated material.
- Netherlands. Five issues, titled Galaxis, appeared from October 1966 to February 1967, from Vector, Dordrecht. The editor was Theo Kemp. The translations were of poor quality.
- Norway. The Norwegian magazine Tempo-Magasinet, published by Greens Forlag, printed translations from US science fiction, mostly from Galaxy. It lasted for five issues, from November 1953 to March 1954. The editor was Arne Ernst.
- Sweden. A Swedish edition, titled Galaxy, appeared from September 1958 to June 1960 (19 issues); the publisher is unknown, though it is known to be the same company that published the Swedish edition of Mad. This version, which included some original Swedish stories, was edited by Henrik Rabe.
- UK. Several British editions of Galaxy were produced. From 1953 to 1962, Strato Publications (a Thorpe & Porter imprint) published 94 numbered issues. The series began in January 1953 with the eccentrically numbered vol. 3 no. 1 (reprinting the American original vol. 5 no. 1), followed by the previous American issue (vol. 4 no. 6) as vol. 3 no. 2. The first 71 British issues drew on American issues published between July 1952 and December 1958, although the content did not always follow the original U.S. sequence, and seven American issues were not reprinted at all. The early British issues were labeled vol. 3 nos. 1–12, after which the volume number was dropped. Until issue 72 (February 1959), the British editions were shortened versions of the U.S. edition, with one or more stories or features cut. From issue 72, Strato reprinted the full U.S. issue with a different title page, and from issue 80 the U.S. edition was used with a variant cover, differing only in the U.K. price and issue number printed on the cover. After issue 94, U.K. month and price information was applied to the covers of original U.S. editions using a round ink stamp. (Note: The seven U.S. issues not reprinted were August 1952, March, April, and December 1954, April and May 1955, and December 1955. Note Lawler mistakenly gives September 1954 to March 1955 as the range for issues 11 to 29; it should be September 1953.) In 1967 a British edition appeared from Gold Star Publications; there were five bimonthly issues, identical to the US edition dated six months previously. The British issues were dated January–February 1967 through September–October 1967; the corresponding US issues were June, August, October, and December 1966, and February 1967. Universal-Tandem Publishing Co Ltd published 25 issues of Galaxy in the UK; the original US issues were May–June 1972 to January 1975. These were re-covered for UK distribution. The numbering was erratic: it ran 1–10, then 11, 11, 12, 12, 12, 14, and finally 17–25.

=== Other bibliographic details ===
The following table shows which issues appeared from which publisher.

Dates	Publisher
October 1950 – September 1951	World Editions, Inc., New York
October 1951 – May 1969	Galaxy Publishing Corp., New York
July 1969 – March 1977	UPD Corp., New York
May 1977 – September–October 1979	UPD, Scarsdale, New York
Summer 1980	Avenue Victor Hugo
January 1994 – April 1995	Institute for the Development of the Harmonious Being, Inc.
August 2024 –	Starship Sloane Publishing Company, Inc.

The title changed several times, and was frequently inconsistently given between the cover, spine, indicia, and masthead.

Start month	End month	Cover	Spine	Indicia	Masthead	Number of issues
Oct–50	Aug–58	Galaxy Science Fiction	Galaxy Science Fiction	Galaxy Science Fiction	Galaxy Science Fiction	94
Sep–58	Oct–62	Galaxy Magazine	Galaxy Magazine	Galaxy Magazine	Galaxy Magazine	27
Dec–62	Dec–65	Galaxy	Galaxy	Galaxy Magazine	Galaxy Magazine	19
Feb–66	Sep–68	Galaxy Science Fiction	Galaxy	Galaxy Magazine	Galaxy Magazine	18
Oct–68	Oct–69	Galaxy Science Fiction Magazine	Galaxy	Galaxy Magazine	Galaxy Magazine	12
Nov–69	Jan–72	Galaxy Science Fiction Magazine	Galaxy	Galaxy Magazine	Galaxy Science Fiction Magazine	20
Mar–72	Mar–72	Galaxy Magazine	Galaxy	Galaxy Magazine	Galaxy Science Fiction Magazine	1
May/Jun–72	Jan–73	Galaxy Magazine	Galaxy Science Fiction	Galaxy Magazine	Galaxy Science Fiction	5
Mar/Apr–73	Mar/Apr–73	Galaxy Magazine	Galaxy	Galaxy Magazine	Galaxy Science Fiction Magazine	1
May/Jun–73	Nov–73	Galaxy	Galaxy	Galaxy	Galaxy Science Fiction	5
Dec–73	Dec–73	Galaxy Science Fiction	Galaxy	Galaxy	Galaxy Science Fiction Magazine	1
Jan–74	Jan–75	Galaxy	Galaxy	Galaxy	Galaxy Science Fiction Magazine	13
Feb–75	Jan–76	Galaxy	Galaxy	Galaxy Incorporating Worlds of If	Galaxy Science Fiction Magazine	9
Feb–76	Oct–77	Galaxy Science Fiction	Galaxy Science Fiction	Galaxy Incorporating Worlds of If	Galaxy Science Fiction	16
Nov–77	Dec-77/Jan–78	Galaxy	Galaxy	Galaxy Incorporating Worlds of If	Galaxy	2
Feb–78	Oct–79	Galaxy Science Fiction	Galaxy Science Fiction	Galaxy Incorporating Worlds of If	Galaxy Science Fiction	10
Summer–80	Summer–80	Galaxy	Galaxy	Galaxy	Galaxy	1
Jan/Feb–94	Mar/Apr–95	Galaxy	Galaxy	Galaxy	Galaxy	8
Aug–2024		Galaxy Science Fiction	Galaxy Science Fiction	Galaxy	Galaxy Science Fiction	1

Galaxy remained a digest-sized magazine from the beginning until 1979; the last issue was published in pulp format, as were the semi-professional issues produced by E. J. Gold. The page count began at 160; it dropped to 144 in January 1955, but went up to 192 in February 1959. In July 1969 the count went back down to 160; it returned to 192 pages with the August–September 1970 issue and stayed there till May–June 1971, when it dropped to 176. From June 1974 to June–July 1979 it was back at 160 pages, and then went to 128 pages for the final digest issue, September–October 1979. The single 1980 issue was 72 pages long. The eight issues published in the 1990s all had 96 pages, except the first, January–February 1994, which had 56 pages. The initial price was 25 cents. Price changes were as follows: 35 cents from May 1958; 50 cents from February 1959; 60 cents from December 1964; 75 cents from August–September 1970; $1.00 from April 1975; 79 cents for the August 1975 issue; 95 cents from September 1975; $1.00 from May 1976; $1.25 from June 1977, and $1.50 for the final professional issue in 1980.

=== Derivative anthologies ===
Several anthologies of stories from Galaxy have been published. The following list does not include reprint editions though in some cases these varied in contents, as for example with the UK editions of some of the early volumes.

Year	Editor	Title	Publisher
1952	H. L. Gold	Galaxy Reader of Science Fiction	Crown: New York
1954	H. L. Gold	Second Galaxy Reader of Science Fiction	Crown: New York
1958	H. L. Gold	Third Galaxy Reader of Science Fiction	Doubleday: New York
1958	H. L. Gold	Five Galaxy Short Novels	Doubleday: New York
1959	H. L. Gold	The World That Couldn't Be and Eight Other Novelets From Galaxy	Doubleday: New York
1959	H. L. Gold	The Fourth Galaxy Reader of Science Fiction	Doubleday: New York
1960	H. L. Gold	The Bodyguard and Four Other Short Novels From Galaxy	Doubleday: New York
1961	H. L. Gold	The Mind Partner and Eight Other Novelets From Galaxy	Doubleday: New York
1961	H. L. Gold	The Fifth Galaxy Reader of Science Fiction	Doubleday: New York
1962	H. L. Gold	The Sixth Galaxy Reader of Science Fiction	Doubleday: New York
1962	Frederik Pohl	Time Waits for Winthrop and Four Other Short Novels From Galaxy	Doubleday: New York
1964	Frederik Pohl	The Seventh Galaxy Reader	Doubleday: New York
1965	Frederik Pohl	The Eighth Galaxy Reader	Doubleday: New York
1966	Frederik Pohl	The Ninth Galaxy Reader	Doubleday: New York
1967	Frederik Pohl	The Tenth Galaxy Reader	Doubleday: New York
1969	Frederik Pohl	The Eleventh Galaxy Reader	Doubleday: New York
1972	"The Editors of Galaxy"	The Best From Galaxy, Volume I	Award Books: New York
1974	"The Editors of Galaxy"	The Best From Galaxy, Volume II	Award Books: New York
1975	Jim Baen	The Best From Galaxy, Volume III	Award Books: New York
1976	Jim Baen	The Best From Galaxy, Volume IV	Award Books: New York
1980	Jim Baen	Galaxy: The Best of My Years	Ace: New York
1980	Frederik Pohl, Martin H. Greenberg, and Joseph D. Olander	Galaxy Magazine: Thirty Years of Innovative Science Fiction	Playboy Press: Chicago

== Related publications ==
Two series of companion novels were issued by the publishers. The first series, Galaxy Science Fiction Novels, began in 1950 with Eric Frank Russell's Sinister Barrier; seven titles were released by World Editions, and a further twenty-eight by Guinn's Galaxy Publishing Corporation. The books were initially in digest format but this was changed to a standard paperback format for the last four titles. In 1959 the line was sold to Beacon Books, which produced another 11 volumes. Beacon specialized in softcore pornography, and changed the titles of most of the books they published to be more suggestive. The last title, Sin in Space (originally Outpost Mars), by Cyril Judd (a pseudonym for Cyril Kornbluth and Judith Merril) appeared in 1961. Two years later a second series, Galaxy Magabooks, appeared; each of these consisted of two short novels, both by the same author, published in a single volume. Only three were released; the last, And My Fear Is Great/Baby Is Three by Theodore Sturgeon, appeared in 1964. (Note: The other two were The Sky Is Falling/Badge of Infamy by Lester del Rey and The Legion of Time/After World's End by Jack Williamson.)

== Sources ==
- Aldiss, Brian; Wingrove, David (1986). Trillion Year Spree: The History of Science Fiction. London: Gollancz. ISBN 0-575-03943-4.
- Ashley, Mike (1976). The History of the Science Fiction Magazine Vol. 3 1946–1955. Chicago: Contemporary Books. ISBN 0-8092-7842-1.
- Ashley, Mike (2005). Transformations: The Story of the Science Fiction Magazines from 1950 to 1970. Liverpool: Liverpool University Press. ISBN 0-85323-779-4.
- Ashley, Mike (2007). Gateways to Forever: The Story of the Science-Fiction Magazines from 1970 to 1980. Liverpool: Liverpool University Press. ISBN 978-1-84631-003-4.
- Asimov, Isaac (1979). In Memory Yet Green. Garden City: Doubleday. ISBN 0-385-13679-X.
- Atheling, William Jr. (1974). More Issues at Hand. Chicago: Advent. ISBN 0-911682-18-X.
- Clute, John; Peter Nicholls (1993). The Encyclopedia of Science Fiction. New York: St. Martin's Press. ISBN 0-312-09618-6.
- Clute, John (1995). Science Fiction: The Illustrated Encyclopedia. New York: Dorling Kindersley. ISBN 0-7894-0185-1.
- de Camp, L. Sprague (1953). Science-Fiction Handbook: The Writing of Imaginative Fiction. New York: Hermitage House.
- del Rey, Lester (1979). The World of Science Fiction: 1926–1976: The History of a Subculture. New York: Ballantine Books. ISBN 0-345-25452-X.
- di Fate, Vincent (1997). Infinite Worlds. New York: The Wonderland Press. ISBN 0-670-87252-0.
- Franson, Donald; DeVore, Howard (1978). A History of the Hugo, Nebula and International Fantasy Awards. Dearborn, Michigan: Misfit Press.
- Gold, Horace L. (1976). What Will They Think of Last?. Crestline, California: Institute for the Development of the Harmonious Human Being (IDHHB). OCLC 2693317.
- Hartwell, David, ed. (2006). The Science Fiction Century. Vol. One. New York: Tor Books. ISBN 0-312-86484-1.
- Knight, Damon (1974). In Search of Wonder. Chicago: Advent. ISBN 0-911682-15-5.
- Lawler, Donald L. (1985). "Galaxy Science Fiction". In Tymn, Marshall B.; Ashley, Mike (eds.). Science Fiction, Fantasy and Weird Fiction Magazines. Westport, Connecticut: Greenwood Press. pp. 290–309. ISBN 0-3132-1221-X.
- Ortiz, Luis (2007). Emshwiller: Infinity X Two. New York: Nonstop Press. ISBN 978-1-933065-08-3.
- Pohl, Frederik (1979). The Way the Future Was. London: Gollancz. ISBN 0-575-02672-3.
- Pohl, Frederik; Greenberg, Martin H.; Olander, Joseph D., eds. (1980). Galaxy: Thirty Years of Innovative Science Fiction (Book Club ed.).
- Rosheim, David L. (1986). Galaxy Magazine: The Dark and the Light Years. Chicago: Advent. ISBN 0-911682-28-7.
- Stableford, Brian (2007). Heterocosms, and Other Essays on Fantastic Literature. Rockville, Md.: Wildside. ISBN 978-0-8095-1907-1.
- Tuck, Donald H. (1982). The Encyclopedia of Science Fiction and Fantasy. Vol. 3. Chicago: Advent. ISBN 0-911682-26-0.
