= Leo Margulies =

American editor and publisher

Leo Margulies (June 22, 1900 – December 26, 1975) was an American editor and publisher of science fiction and fantasy pulp magazines and paperback books.

== Biography ==
Margulies was born in Brooklyn, New York City, New York, but was raised in Norwalk, Connecticut. After briefly attending Columbia University, Margulies began working for Munsey's Magazine, selling subsidiary rights to its stories. He later spent five years as head of East Coast research for Fox Films, a predecessor company of 20th Century Fox, and afterward became editorial chief of publisher Ned Pines' Standard Magazines. At one time in the 1930s, he reportedly edited 46 magazines, including the pulp magazines Startling Stories and Thrilling Wonder Stories.

During World War II, Margulies served as a war correspondent. He was on board the USS Missouri when the Japanese surrendered.

After the war, Margulies helped launch Pines' Popular Library line of paperback books. He was co-editor of the anthology My Best Science Fiction Story in 1949 and went on to compile several science fiction and fantasy paperback anthologies. He was editor of Mike Shayne's Mystery Magazine at the time of his death.

In December 1975, he was attending a meeting in London of the Mystery Writers of America when he suffered a stroke. He died December 26 in Los Angeles, California.

Margulies was married to the former Cylvia Kleinman at the time of his death.
