= Oscar J. Friend =

American novelist

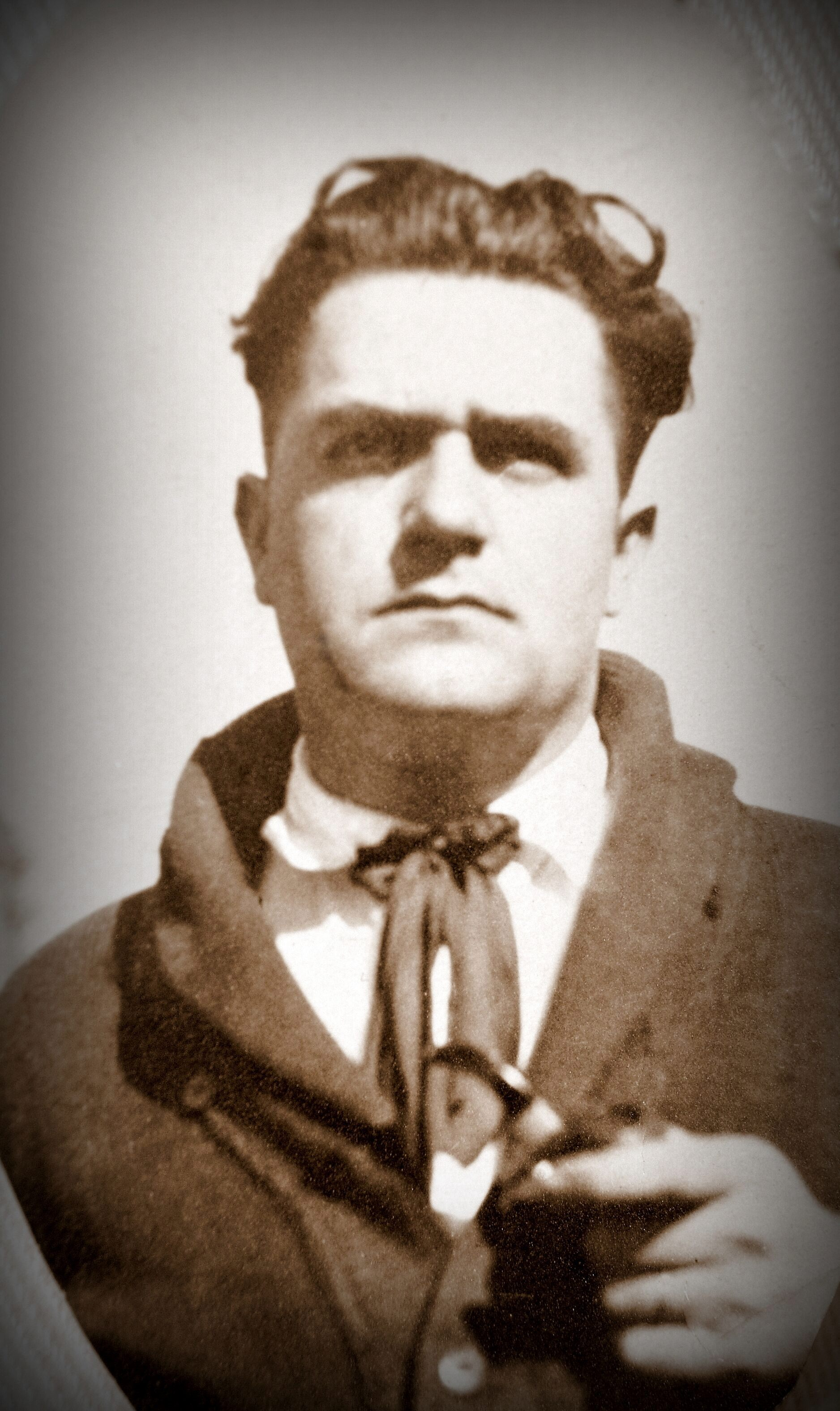
Fictioneer, editor and literary agent Oscar J. Friend.

Oscar Jerome Friend (January 8, 1897 – January 19, 1963) was an American author. He began his career primarily as a pulp fiction writer for various genres including horror, Westerns, science fiction, and detective fiction. As a pulp writer he worked with Wonder Stories, Startling Stories, Strange Stories, Captain Future and Thrilling Wonder Stories. As his career progressed, Oscar Friend authored many novels, which were published worldwide. Friend wrote screenplays, worked as an editor on periodicals, and was co-editor of several anthologies. Finally, he owned and managed a literary agency.

== Biography ==
Oscar Jerome Friend was born on January 8, 1897, in St. Louis, Missouri, to Joseph and Jinnie L. Friend. He married Irene Ozment in 1917.

Oscar Friend relocated to Los Angeles at the request of Walt Disney Productions, and worked for some time as a scriptwriter for movies for Universal Studios before returning to New York.

He died in January 1963.

== Legacy ==
Upon the death of his friend and literary agent, Otis Kline, Oscar Friend acquired ownership of his company, Otis Kline Associates. Friend, with the partnership of his wife Irene Ozment Friend, became one of the major international science fiction and fantasy agents of the 1950s and 1960s. Oscar Friend's clients included Isaac Asimov, Robert A. Heinlein, Ray Bradbury, Robert E. Howard, Theodore Sturgeon, Murray Leinster, and Frank Herbert.

== Novels ==
Friend's thrillers were written using the pseudonym Owen Fox Jerome. He also used the pseudonyms Ford Smith & Frank Johnson for his science fiction novels, and the pseudonym Sergeant Saturn as editor.

=== Science fiction ===
- The Kid From Mars (1948) Disney approached Oscar J. Friend just after World War II, planning to make this novel into a musical with Danny Kaye, but the movie plans were terminated due to a change in Kaye's retirement plans. The movie rights to the book were again optioned by Disney during the 1990s.
- Of Jovian Build (1938)
- The Worms Turn (1940)
- The Stolen Spectrum (1940s)
- The Water World (1941)
- The Molecule Monsters (1942, 1950)
- Roar of the Rocket (1950)
- The Star Men (1953)

=== Westerns ===
- Click of Triangle T (1925) published first as a novel, then produced as a movie by Universal Pictures, starring Hoot Gibson
- The Round Up (1924)
- The Bullet Eater (1925)
- The Wolf of Wildcat Mountain (1926)
- Gun Harvest (1927, republished 1948)
- Bloody Ground (1928)
- The Mississippi Hawk (1929)
- The Hawk of Hazard (1929)
- The Maverick (1930)
- Half Moon Ranch (1931)
- The Range Maverick (1934)
- Without Benefit of Bullets (1941)
- The Wedding Gift (1943)
- Oklahoma Gun Song (1944)
- Love's Gun Doctor (1944)
- Gun Trail To Glory (1940s)
- Betty of the Lazy W (1940s)
- The Range Doctor (1948)
- Guns of Powder River (first published by this title in the UK in 1950) [republished in 1963 in the USA as Action At Powder River with the pseudonym Ford Smith]
- The Last Raid (1952)
- Lobo Brand (1954)

=== Thrillers ===
- The Hand Of Horror (1927)
- The Red Kite Clue (1928)
- Domes of Silence (1929)
- The Golf Course Murders (1929) published in the U.S. and the U.K.
- The Murder At Avalon Arms (1931) published in the U.S. and the U.K.
- The Cat and the Fiddle (19__)
- Murder - As Usual (1942)
- Shadow Justice (1942)
- The Corpse Awaits (1946)
- Death Script (19__)
- A Night At Club Bagdad (1950)
- Double Life (1959)
- The Five Assassins (1958)
- Leave Everything To Me (1959)

== Anthologies co-edited by Oscar J. Friend ==
- From Off This World (1949) with Leo Margulies
- My Best Science Fiction Story (1949) with Leo Margulies
- Giant Anthology of SF (1954) with Leo Margulies
- Giant Anthology of Science Fiction (1954) with Leo Margulies
- Race to the Stars (1958) with Leo Margulies
