= 10 Story Fantasy =

US pulp science fiction magazine

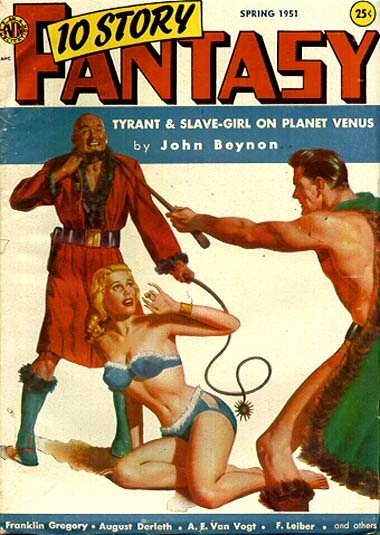
Cover of the only issue; the artist is James Bama

10 Story Fantasy (occasionally referred to as Ten Story Fantasy) was a science fiction and fantasy pulp magazine which was launched in 1951. The market for pulp magazines was already declining by that time, and the magazine only lasted a single issue. The stories were of generally good quality, and included work by many well-known writers, such as John Wyndham, A.E. van Vogt and Fritz Leiber. The most famous story it published was Arthur C. Clarke's "Sentinel from Eternity", which later became part of the basis of the movie 2001: A Space Odyssey.

== Publication history ==
The early 1950s saw dramatic changes in the history of U.S. science fiction publishing. At the start of 1949, all but one of the major magazines in the field were in pulp format; by the end of 1955, almost all had either ceased publication or switched to digest format. Despite the rapid decline of the pulp market, several new science fiction magazines were launched in pulp format during these years. In 1950, Avon Publications experimented with a format that included several pages of comics, trying new pulp magazines in three genres: romance, westerns, and science fiction. The sci-fi pulp, titled Out of This World Adventures, lasted for two issues; the others for only one.

Despite these failures, Joseph Meyers, Avon's owner, decided to try another pulp magazine the following year when his printer, J.W. Clements offered Meyers a low price for printing a pulp magazine. Donald A. Wollheim, Avon's executive editor, titled the new magazine 10 Story Fantasy, although it actually contained thirteen stories. The layout bore a strong resemblance to that of Out of This World Adventures: both magazines had unusually elaborate artwork for the table of contents, and in both magazines the first letter of each story was decorated with black and white art. As in Out of This World Adventures, the interior art was mostly supplied by William McWilliam and "Martin", both of whom worked in Avon's comics department.

The cover art, selected by Meyers, not Wollheim, illustrates John Wyndham's story "Tyrant & Slave-Girl on Planet Venus" (published under the pseudonym "John Beynon"). This story had been sold first to the British magazine New Worlds, under the title "No Place Like Earth"; Wyndham subsequently sold the American rights to Wollheim, and it appeared on both sides of the Atlantic at the same time. Myers picked the new, more lurid title; all subsequent reprint appearances used the title "No Place Like Earth".

10 Story Fantasy's most famous story is Arthur C. Clarke's "Sentinel from Eternity", which Clarke submitted to a BBC writing competition in 1948; it did not receive a prize or honorable mention. The story later became part of the basis of the movie 2001: A Space Odyssey. The stories were generally of good quality, with several well-known contributors such as A.E. van Vogt, L. Sprague de Camp, August Derleth, and Lester del Rey. Among the better-received stories were "Friend to Man", by C.M. Kornbluth; "Private Worlds", by Wollheim, under the pseudonym "Martin Pearson"; "Cry Witch", by Fritz Leiber; and "Seeds of Futurity", by Kris Neville.

Although the quality of the stories was high, the publisher was unwilling to commit to future issues, and the Spring 1951 issue was the only one that appeared.

== Bibliographic details ==
The magazine was announced as a quarterly but only one issue was published. Donald Wollheim was editor for the only issue, which was numbered volume 1 number 1. It was published in pulp format, priced at 25 cents and was 128 pages. The publisher was Avon Periodicals of New York.

== Sources ==
- Ashley, Michael (1976). The History of the Science Fiction Magazine Vol. 3 1946–1955. Chicago: Contemporary Books, Inc. ISBN 0-8092-7842-1.
- Ashley, Mike (2005). Transformations:The Story of the Science-Fiction Magazines from 1950 to 1970. Liverpool: Liverpool University Press. ISBN 0-85323-779-4.
- Boston, John; Broderick, Damien (2013). Building New Worlds, 1946–1959: The Carnell Era, Volume One. Wildside Press LLC. ISBN 978-1-4344-4587-2.
- Bousfield, Wendy (1985a). "Out of This World Adventures". In Tymn, Marshall B.; Ashley, Mike (eds.). Science Fiction, Fantasy, and Weird Fiction Magazines. Westport CT: Greenwood Press. pp. 467–471. ISBN 0-313-21221-X.
- Bousfield, Wendy (1985b). "Ten Story Fantasy". In Tymn, Marshall B.; Ashley, Mike (eds.). Science Fiction, Fantasy, and Weird Fiction Magazines. Westport CT: Greenwood Press. pp. 249–250. ISBN 0-313-21221-X.
- Cahir, Linda Costanzo (2006). Literature into Film: Theory and Practical Approaches. Jefferson NC: McFarland. ISBN 978-0-7864-2597-6.
