= Leslie F. Stone =

American writer

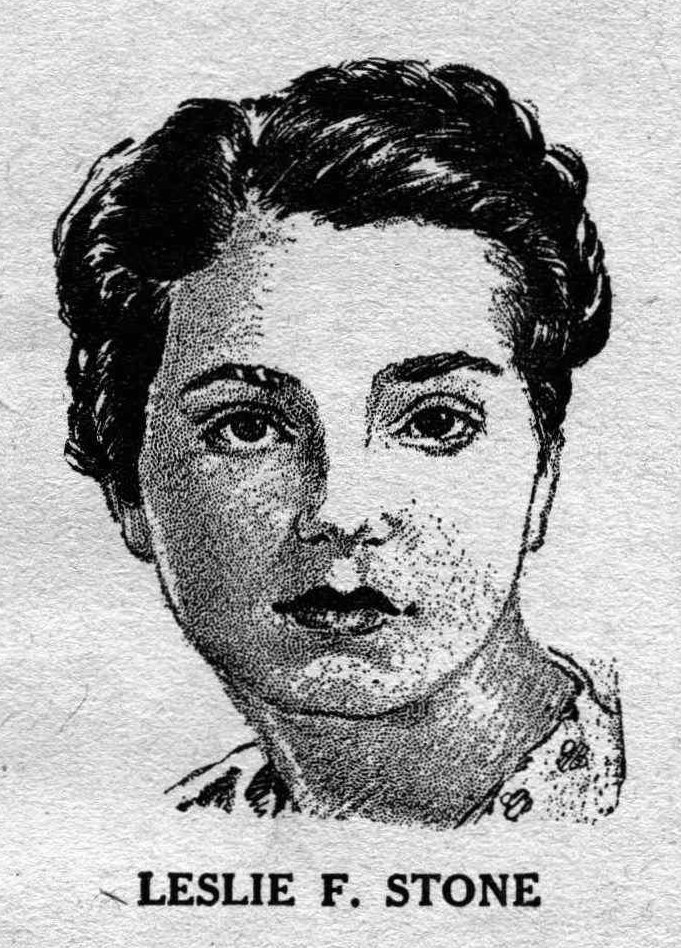
- Born: June 8, 1905; Philadelphia
- Died: March 21, 1991 (aged 85); Philadelphia
- Occupation: Writer

Leslie Frances Silberberg (June 8, 1905 – March 21, 1991), known by the pen name Leslie F. Stone, was an American writer and one of the first women science fiction pulp writers, contributing over 20 stories to science fiction magazines between 1929 and 1940.

== Personal life ==
Stone was born Leslie Frances Rubenstein in 1905 in Philadelphia to George S. Rubenstein and Lillian A. (Spellman) Rubenstein (a well known poet and author from the turn of the century), Stone married William Silberberg, a labor reporter, in 1927 with whom she had two sons they raised in the Washington, D.C. area where later in life she won prizes as a gardener and ceramist.

== Career ==
By the time she was in high school in Norfolk, Virginia, Stone was publishing fantasy stories in the local newspaper. She went on to be among the first women to publish in the science fiction pulp magazines of the era. She often worked with Hugo Gernsback on Amazing Stories and Wonder Stories. Stone wrote space operas and thought experiments, as well as stories featuring both women and black protagonists. After writing more than 20 short fiction pieces, Stone stopped writing fiction, which she suggested was a combination of seeing the horrors of war, making it hard to write about the future, and increasing conflicts with male editors who refused to publish her work because she was a woman.

She worked at the National Institutes of Health in Bethesda, Maryland, after her husband's death in 1957. She returned to writing by editing and republishing Out of the Void as a standalone novel in 1971. In 1974, Stone published Day of the Pulps, about her time publishing in the 1920s and 1930s.

== Work ==
Stone's work is similar to much of the pulp fiction written in the time period, with stock characters and simple plots, but Stone also included some of the first women and black protagonists as well as the first planet dominated by women in the science fiction pulps. In her story "Out of the Void," Stone creates a memorable female character who conceals her sex to avoid the gender-based expectations of her time and engage in scientific exploration. Asking if Stone's writing is feminist is complicated by her use of contemporary aspects of the pulp science fiction genre, specifically male narrators and viewpoints. While her work is not explicitly feminist, her writing often critiques masculinity and its role in science and often frames her stories with positive images of strong female characters and societies. Additionally, while her writing was similar in style to other works of the time, Stone used her work to critique racism, question war, and question science and its potential outcomes.

Stone is cited (by figures such as Isaac Asimov and Frederik Pohl) as an early science fiction writer who used an ambiguously gendered name to hide their gender. Others claim Stone was identified as a woman writer at the time. Stone, herself, wrote in her unpublished "Reminiscences" that she chose to deliberately take advantage of her androgynous name, using only her middle initial to avoid the give-away gendered spelling of Frances. Indeed, she encountered several instances of sexism while trying to publish science fiction in the pulps and recalls hostile reactions from both editors (including Campbell and Conklin) and fans who learned she was a woman.However, she also reports that she was welcomed by Gernsback; readers' letters referring to Stone as male were corrected by the editor.

== Bibliography ==
=== Fiction series ===
- The Void
  - Out of the Void (1929) (also serialized in two parts)
  - Across the Void (1931) (serialized in three parts)
- Mentor
  - Men with Wings (1929)
  - Women with Wings (1930)

=== Short fiction ===
- When the Sun Went Out (1929)
- Letter of the Twenty-Fourth Century (1929)
- Through the Veil (1930)
- The Conquest of Gola (1931)
- The Hell Planet (1932)
- The Man Who Fought a Fly (1932)
- Gulliver, 3000 A.D. (1933)
- The Rape of the Solar System (1934)
- Cosmic Joke (1935)
- The Man With the Four Dimensional Eyes (1935)
- When the Flame-Flowers Blossomed (1935)
- The Fall of Mercury (1935)
- The Human Pets of Mars (1936)
- The Great Ones (1937)
- Death Dallies Awhile (1938)
- The Space Terror (1939)
- Gravity Off! (1940)

=== Novel ===
- Out of the Void (1967) - a revision of earlier stories

=== Other work ===
- Day of the Pulps (1974) - discussing her time writing for pulps
