= Flash Gordon Strange Adventure Magazine =

US pulp science fiction magazine

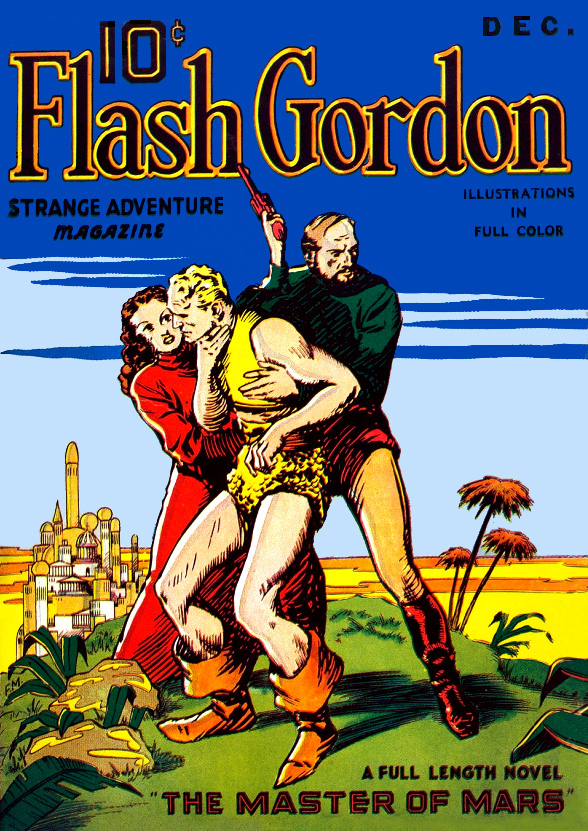
The only issue; the cover art, probably by Fred Meagher, depicts Dale Arden, Flash Gordon, and Dr. Zarkov.

Flash Gordon Strange Adventure Magazine was a pulp magazine which was launched in December 1936. It was published by Harold Hersey, and was an attempt to cash in on the growing comics boom, and the popularity of the Flash Gordon comic strip in particular. The magazine contained a novel about Flash Gordon and three unrelated stories; there were also eight full-page color illustrations. The quality of both the artwork and the fiction was low, and the magazine saw only a single issue. It is now extremely rare.

== Publication history and contents ==
Although science fiction (sf) had been published before the 1920s, it did not begin to coalesce into a separately marketed genre until the appearance in 1926 of Amazing Stories, a pulp magazine published by Hugo Gernsback. After 1931, when Miracle Science and Fantasy Stories was launched, no new science fiction magazines appeared for several years. In 1934 a science fiction comic strip following the adventures of superhero Flash Gordon appeared in newspapers and quickly became popular. In 1936 the strip spawned a movie serial in thirteen parts, also titled Flash Gordon. Late that year Harold Hersey, an experienced pulp magazine editor and publisher, decided to launch three new magazines based on comics. The first two were titled Dan Dunn Detective Magazine and Tailspin Tommy Air Adventure Magazine; these were launched in September and October 1936 respectively. The third was Flash Gordon Strange Adventures Magazine, which saw a single issue, dated December 1936; it was copyrighted by both Hersey and King Features, the syndicate that owned the copyright to Flash Gordon. Dan Dunn and Tailspin Tommy produced one more issue each before Hersey closed down the venture. Hersey planned a second issue of Flash Gordon Strange Adventure, but it never appeared. It is not known why; poor sales figures from the other magazines may have been responsible, or Hersey may simply have run out of money, or possibly King Features, the owner of the copyright to Flash Gordon, granted rights to Hersey for only one issue, and withdrew from the venture after the first issue appeared. Sf historian Everett Bleiler notes that Hersey did not mention the venture in his autobiographical Pulpwood Editor, published a year later, and adds that "given Hersey's usual attempts to glorify himself and to gild his failures, this silence suggests a fiasco larger than usual".

The magazine contained a lead novel and three short stories. The novel, The Master of Mars, by James Edison Northford (or Northfield; the name is spelled one way on the contents page and the other way at the head of the story), has been described by Bleiler as "moronic". Bleiler also comments that of three short stories, one is dated and another third-rate. Two of the stories were by R.R. Winterbotham; one, "The Saga of the Smokepot", was published under his own name; the other, "The Last War", was published under the pseudonym "R.R. Botham". The other story, "The Man Without a Brain", is a collaboration between R.C. Vance (or R.C. Vane; as with Northford, the magazine is inconsistent in spelling the name) and F.K. Young.

Hersey's idea was to have a pulp magazine about comic strip characters; he hoped that there would be sufficient overlap between pulp readers and comics fans to make the magazine successful. The presentation was like that of a typical pulp, but with eight full-page color illustrations, all by Fred Meagher, who had previously illustrated Westerns. Bleiler describes the artwork as crude and "far inferior to the sometimes elegant work" of Alex Raymond, the creator of Flash Gordon.

The attempt to market pulp fiction to comics fans turned out to be the wrong approach: the comics field was on the verge of dramatic successes, but the crossover appeal for pulp magazines was not there. The magazine was not widely known at the time it was issued, and has since become extremely rare.

== Bibliographic details ==
The publisher of Flash Gordon Strange Adventure Magazine was C.J.H. Publishing Co., based in New York. The sole issue was numbered volume 1, number 1; it was in large pulp format, with 96 pages and was priced at 10 cents. Harold Hersey was the president of C.J.H. and the editor of the magazine. A facsimile of the magazine was released as a book in 2005.

== Sources ==
- Ashley, Mike (1985). "Flash Gordon Strange Adventure Magazine". In Tymn, Marshall B.; Ashley, Mike (eds.). Science Fiction, Fantasy, and Weird Fiction Magazines. Westport CT: Greenwood Press. pp. 273–274. ISBN 0-313-21221-X.
- Ashley, Mike (2000). The Time Machines:The Story of the Science-Fiction Pulp Magazines from the beginning to 1950. Liverpool: Liverpool University Press. ISBN 0-85323-865-0.
- Bleiler, Everett F. (1998). Science-Fiction: The Gernsback Years. Westport CT: Kent State University Press. ISBN 0-87338-604-3.
- Carr, Wooda N. (2013). The Pulp Hero. Wildcat Books. ISBN 978-1-4357-3837-9.
- Edwards, Malcolm; Nicholls, Peter (1993). "SF magazines". In Clute, John; Nicholls, Peter (eds.). The Encyclopedia of Science Fiction. New York: St. Martin's Press, Inc. ISBN 0-312-09618-6.
- Hersey, Harold (December 1936). "Don't Miss The Sun Men of Saturn". Flash Gordon Strange Adventure Magazine.
