= Miracle Science and Fantasy Stories =

US pulp science fiction magazine

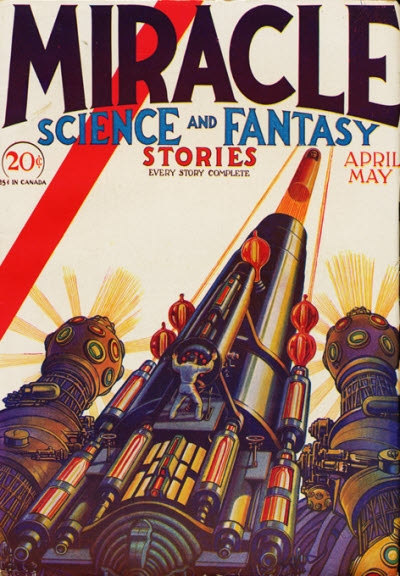
Cover of the first issue; artwork is by Elliott Dold

Miracle Science and Fantasy Stories was an American science fiction magazine which published two issues in 1931. The fiction was unremarkable, but the cover art and illustrations, by Elliott Dold, were high quality, and have made the pulp magazine a collector's item. The magazine ceased publication when Dold became ill and was unable to continue his duties both as editor and artist.

== Publication history ==
In 1931, Harold Hersey, who had been working in the pulp magazine field for over a decade, decided to launch a new science fiction (sf) and fantasy magazine. Hersey had been the editor for the first half of The Thrill Book's run of 16 issues in 1919, and had also worked for Clayton Magazines, where in 1928 he had proposed an sf magazine to William Clayton. Clayton turned down the idea, but the following year changed his mind and launched Astounding Stories of Super Science, with Harry Bates as editor. After Hersey left Clayton and started his own publishing company, he returned to the idea, probably with the encouragement of Elliott Dold, an artist who was providing artwork to Astounding.

Hersey launched Miracle Science and Fantasy Stories in 1931, with Douglas Dold (who was blind) as editor. Elliott Dold also provided the cover artwork for the first issue. Elliott's brother, Douglas, also worked on the magazine; some sources credit Douglas as editor instead but sf historian Howard DeVore argues this stems from a misreading of Hersey's autobiography. Only one more issue appeared: Elliott Dold fell ill and was unable to continue working on the magazine, and Hersey ceased publication; sf historian Mike Ashley comments that this implies it was probably losing money. Miracle included stories by Victor Rousseau and John Miller Gregory. The lead novel in the first issue is credited to Douglas Dold and the lead novel in the second issue to Elliott, but sf historian Richard Bleiler suggests both stories were collaborations by the two brothers. The quality of the fiction was generally very poor, but Elliott Dold's artwork in both issues was of much higher quality, and is the reason that the magazine remains a collector's item to this day.

== Bibliographic details ==
The editor for both issues was Elliott Dold; the publisher was Good Story Magazine Co, based in Springfield, Massachusetts. The two issues were dated April–May and June–July 1931; both were printed in pulp format, priced at 20 cents, and 144 pages long.

== Sources ==
- Ashley, Mike (2000). The Time Machines:The Story of the Science-Fiction Pulp Magazines from the beginning to 1950. Liverpool: Liverpool University Press. ISBN 0-85323-865-0.
- Bleiler, Everett F.; Bleiler, Richard J. (1998). Science-Fiction: The Gernsback Years. Westport CT: Kent State University Press. p. 434. ISBN 0-87338-604-3.
- DeVore, Howard (1985). "Miracle Science and Fantasy Stories". In Tymn, Marshall B.; Ashley, Mike (eds.). Science Fiction, Fantasy, and Weird Fiction Magazines. Westport CT: Greenwood Press. pp. 410–413. ISBN 0-313-21221-X.
- Jones, Robert Kenneth (1975). The Shudder Pulps. West Linn OR: FAX Collector's Editions, Inc. ISBN 0-913960-04-7.
