= Doctor Death (magazine) =

US pulp science fiction magazine

- Cover of the February 1935 issue
- Publisher: Dell Magazines
- First issue: February 1935; 91 years ago
- Final issue: April 1935
- Country: United States
- Language: English

Doctor Death was the title of a short-lived pulp science fiction magazine published by Dell Magazines in 1935, as well as the name of the main character featured in that magazine. Doctor Death was an archcriminal who wanted to return the world to a primitive condition and used supernatural tools such as zombies and magic in his plots against humanity. The stories were written by Harold Ward under the pseudonym of "Zorro". Dell may have intended Doctor Death to be a continuation of a character of the same name in All Detective Magazine, also published by Dell.

== Publication history and contents ==
In 1932 Dell Magazines started a new pulp, titled All Detective Magazine. The August 1934 issue featured "Dr. Death", a story about an archcriminal named Doctor Death; the hero is an insurance investigator named Nibs Holloway. The author was given as Edward P. Norris, which was probably a pseudonym. Three more stories featuring Doctor Death appeared in All Detective, ending with "Thirteen Pearls" in the January 1935 issue, in which the character was killed. All Detective changed its name to Doctor Death the following month; the lead story in the first issue of the retitled magazine, dated February 1935, was 12 Must Die, with the author listed as "Zorro" (a pseudonym for Harold Ward). As with the All Detective stories, 12 Must Die featured an archvillain, but his name was now Rance Mandarin. It is unclear whether Dell intended there to be continuity between the two versions of Dr. Death: Robert Weinberg, a historian of science fiction, comments that Rance Mandarin is "an entirely different" character from the earlier villain, but Michael Cook, a historian of detective magazines, argues that since the first issue of Dr. Death followed directly after the last issue of All Detective, "the connection is likely but not confirmed".

Two more issues of Doctor Death appeared, in March and April 1935, each with a complete Doctor Death novel under the byline of Zorro: The Gray Creatures in the March issue, and The Shriveling Murders in the final issue. The May issue was announced in the magazine but did not appear; the lead Doctor Death novel would have been Murder Music, originally titled Waves of Madness by Ward. Both Waves of Madness, under its original title, and The Red Mist of Death, another Doctor Death novel by Ward that went unpublished in the 1930s, eventually saw print in the fanzines Nemesis and Pulp Vault in the 1980s.

Doctor Death's main opponent in Ward's novels is Jimmy Holm, a detective. In the first novel he is new to the police force; but from the second novel onwards he is a captain. His superior, John Ricks, the Police Chief of New York, is a "typical pulp stereotype of the hard-boiled old-fashioned inspector", according to Weinberg. Ricks, and Nina Ferrera, Mandarin's assistant, are Holm's allies against Doctor Death. Joseph Lewandowski, a magazine historian, considers the first novel the best of the three published in the 1930s, but suggests that Murder Music is better than any of the other four: "The opening chapter is ... extremely effective in setting the mood ... it compares well with what Walter Gibson was doing along these lines with his Shadow stories". Both Lewandowski and Weinberg are critical of the plot details, however: Weinberg comments that despite Ward's attempts to explain Doctor Death's powers in scientific terms at the end of each story, this was no more than "a veneer of plausibility...Death's powers were so vast that it seemed ludicrous that he should be opposed by only the New York Police Force". Lewandowski describes the plots as "poorly thought-out", giving as an example Rick's disguising himself as Holm—Holm is much smaller than the brawny Ricks, but the disguise fools Doctor Death.

Doctor Death calls on zombies, hypnotism, magic, and elementals in the novels. His goal is restore the earth "to its original state. Man will dwell upon it again in primitive simplicity. And I ... will be hailed as the savior of mankind". His character changes over the course of the books: Lewandowski comments that in the first novel he is reluctant to kill, and prevents elementals from feasting on a corpse, but by the latest book he has no such scruples and even "gains a strange sort of relaxation and satisfaction" from plotting the torture of his opponents. By the end of the series the novels have changed from supernatural stories to "weird menace" stories, a genre popular in the 1930s in which apparently supernatural powers are revealed to have a logical explanation at the end of the story.

The magazine contained unrelated short stories in addition to the lead novels; these were likely to have been leftover inventory from All Detective. Contributors included Arthur J. Burks, under his own name, and possibly under pseudonyms.

== Bibliographic details ==
There were three issues of Doctor Death, published by Dell Publishing, and dated February, March, and April 1935, with one volume of three numbers. The editor is not known. The magazine was pulp-sized; all three issues were 128 pages long and were priced at 15 cents. All five of the Harold Ward novels have been reprinted at least once. In 2009 Altus Press released a two-volume omnibus set that included all five novels. The four "Doctor Death" short stories by Edward Norris from All Detective have also been reprinted by Altus Press, in a 2008 volume titled Doctor Death.

== Sources ==
- Ashley, Mike (2000). The Time Machines: The Story of the Science-Fiction Pulp Magazines from the beginning to 1950. Liverpool: Liverpool University Press. ISBN 978-0-85323-865-2.
- Cook, Michael L. (1983). "All Detective Magazine". In Cook, Michael L. (ed.). Mystery, Detective, and Espionage Magazines. Westport, Connecticut: Greenwood Press. p. 21. ISBN 0-313-23310-1.
- Green, Paul (2019). Encyclopedia of Weird Detectives: Supernatural and Paranormal Elements in Novels, Pulps, Comics, Film, Television, Games and Other Media. Jefferson, North Carolina: McFarland. ISBN 978-1-4766-7800-9.
- Jones, Robert Kenneth (1975). The Shudder Pulps: A History of the Weird Menace Magazines of the 1930s. West Linn, Oregon: FAX Collector's Editions. ISBN 0-913960-04-7.
- Lewandowski, Joseph (1983). "Doctor Death". In Cook, Michael L. (ed.). Mystery, Detective, and Espionage Magazines. Westport, Connecticut: Greenwood Press. pp. 185–189. ISBN 0-313-23310-1.
- Weinberg, Robert (1985). "Doctor Death". Science Fiction, Fantasy, and Weird Fiction Magazines. Westport, Connecticut: Greenwood Press. pp. 186–187. ISBN 978-0-313-21221-5.
