= Tales of Magic and Mystery (magazine) =

US pulp fantasy magazine

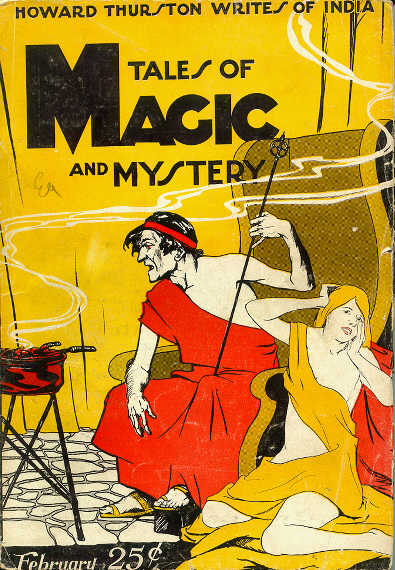
Cover of the February 1928 issue

Tales of Magic and Mystery was a pulp magazine which published five monthly issues from December 1927 to April 1928. It was edited by Walter Gibson, and published a mixture of fiction and articles on magic. It is now mainly remembered for having published a story by H.P. Lovecraft.

== Publication history ==
Tales of Magic and Mystery was published by Personal Arts, which was owned by International Correspondence Schools (ICS). In 1927 ICS had had success with a mailing titled "Secrets of the Ages". Bill Kofoed and Walter Gibson suggested a magazine to appeal to the same audience as the mailing, and Haddon Press, also owned by ICS, provided cost estimates that seemed very positive. Kofoed checked the numbers with Haddon Press and was convinced they were accurate, and the magazine was launched in December of that year with Gibson as editor.

The contributors included H. P. Lovecraft, with "Cool Air", and Frank Owen, with three stories: "The Yellow Pool", "The Black Well of Wadi", and "The Lure of the Shrivelled Hand". A story by Miriam Allen deFord, "Ghostly Hands", also appeared, though it later became apparent that it had been printed without permission or payment. Gibson later recalled that Kofoed obtained some of the submissions from stories submitted to Brief Stories, which Kofoed edited; science fiction historian Mike Ashley suggests that Gibson may not have been fully aware of how the submissions were obtained, and believes it is possible that some of the other material printed was also not paid for.

The magazine is now extremely rare, and has become a collector's item because of the connection to H. P. Lovecraft. Most of Lovecraft's short fiction appeared in Weird Tales, and it is possible that he submitted to Tales of Magic and Mystery because of his interest in Harry Houdini—he had ghost-written a story for Houdini a couple of years earlier, and Gibson was a friend of Houdini's. In addition to fiction the magazine published articles about magic, all of which were written by Gibson, some under pen-names. The articles included one on bullet-catching (illustrated by Earle K. Bergey), one on mysterious people, and a series on Houdini. Overall, the magazine focused more on magic than on fiction, but the stories chosen were readable. The weird and occult fiction genre was dominated by Weird Tales in the years before World War II; Tales of Magic and Mystery and Ghost Stories were the only two magazines to attempt to rival Weird Tales in the years before 1931, when Strange Tales appeared.

After the fifth issue, it became apparent that the reason the cost estimates had appeared so strong was that Haddon Press had forgotten to include the cost of the paper. This made it apparent that the magazine was losing money rapidly, and Tales of Magic and Mystery was immediately shut down. Some of the manuscripts in inventory at the time the magazine was closed down may have been printed in True Strange Stories, another short-lived magazine which Gibson edited the following year.

== Bibliographic details ==
	Jan	Feb	Mar	Apr	May	Jun	Jul	Aug	Sep	Oct	Nov	Dec
1927												1/1
1928	1/2	1/3	1/4	1/5								
Issues of Tales of Magic and Mystery from 1927 to 1928, showing volume and issue numbers. Walter Gibson was editor throughout.

Walter B. Gibson was the editor of all five issues of Tales of Magic and Mystery, which remained in saddle-stapled pulp format throughout its run. It was priced at 25 cents, and each issue was 64 pages long.

In 2004, Wildside Press released a facsimile edition of the February 1928 issue, and in 2013, Adventure House released a facsimile of the March 1928 issue.

== Sources ==
- Ashley, Mike (1985). "Tales of Magic and Mystery". In Tymn, Marshall B.; Ashley, Mike (eds.). Science Fiction, Fantasy, and Weird Fiction Magazines. Westport CT: Greenwood Press. pp. 644–647. ISBN 0-313-21221-X.
- Dziemianowicz, Stefan R. (1990). "Introduction". In Weinberg, Robert; Dziemianowicz, Stefan R.; Greenberg, Martin H. (eds.). Rivals of Weird Tales. New York: Bonanza Books. p. xii−xx. ISBN 978-0-517-69331-5.
- Betancourt, John, ed. (2004). Tales of Magic and Mystery February 1928. Rockville MD: Wildside Press. ISBN 0809511460.
