= Out of This World Adventures =

US pulp science fiction magazine

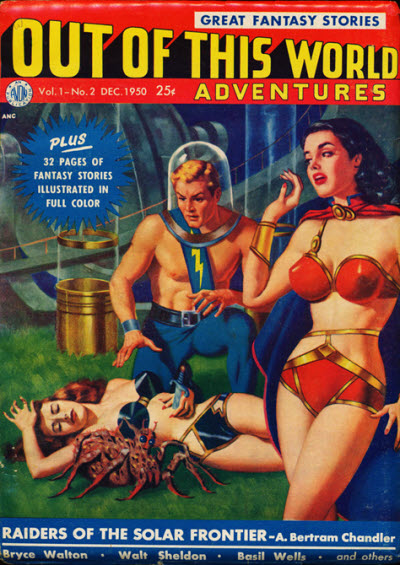
Cover of the December 1950 issue. Art by James Bama.

Out of This World Adventures was an American pulp magazine which published two issues, in July and December 1950. It included several pages of comics as well as science fiction stories. It was edited by Donald A. Wollheim and published by Avon. Sales were weak, and after two issues Avon decided to cancel it.

== Publication history ==
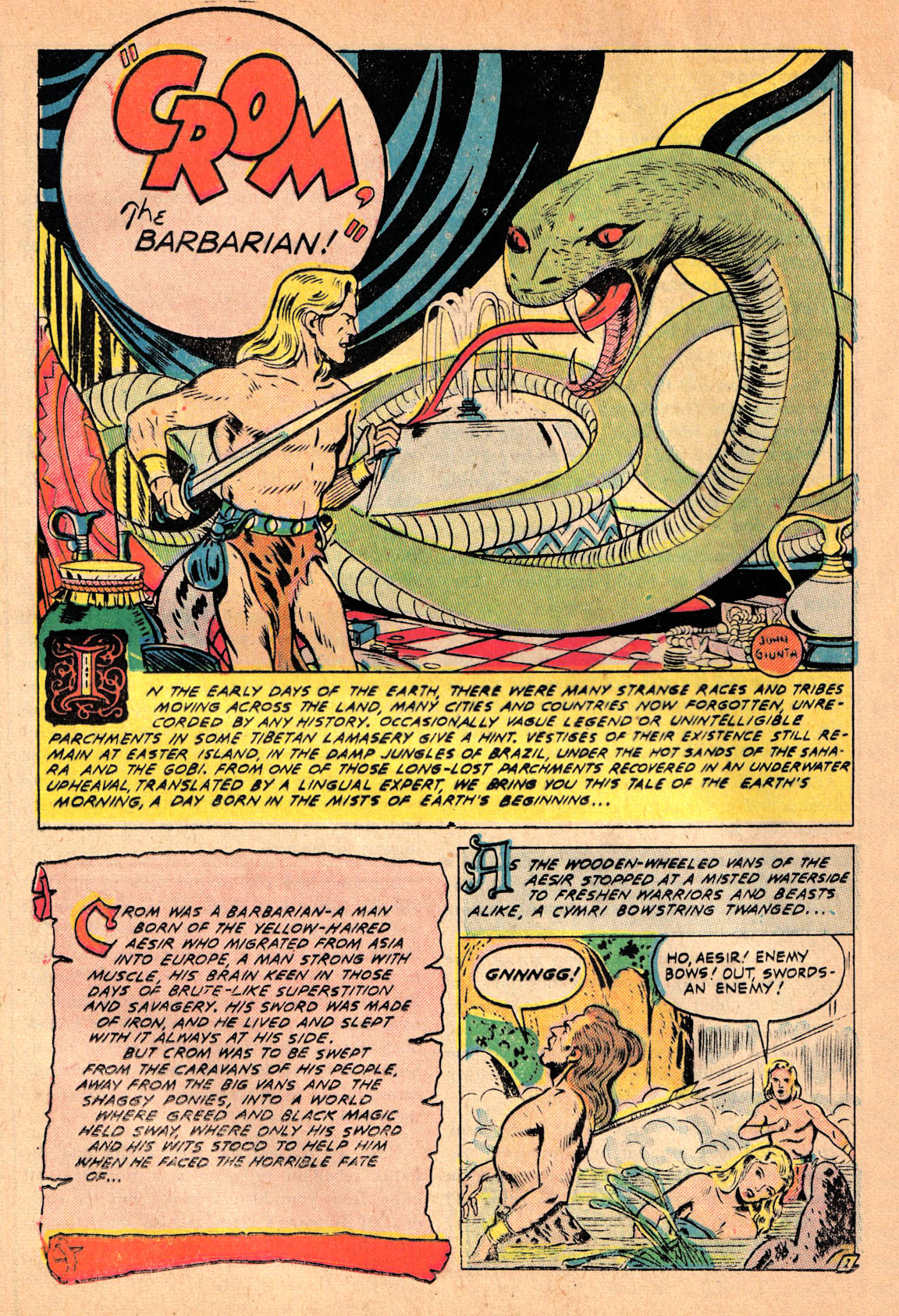
Crom, the Barbarian in Out of This World Adventures #1, July 1950, art by John Giunta.

The early 1950s saw dramatic changes in the world of U.S. science fiction publishing. At the start of 1949, all but one of the major magazines in the field were in pulp format; by the end of 1955, almost all had either ceased publication or switched to digest format. Despite the rapid decline of the pulp market, several new science fiction magazines were launched in pulp format during these years; Out of This World Adventures was one of these.

In 1947 Avon Books launched the Avon Fantasy Reader, a series of fantasy anthologies in digest format, edited by Donald A. Wollheim. (Note: These were considered by Avon to be books, but have generally been regarded by fans and bibliographers as magazines.) Two years later, Joseph Meyers, Avon's president, decided to launch a science fiction magazine, and Wollheim purchased six stories for it before it was cancelled for financial reasons. (Note: The stories were subsequently published in The Girl with the Hungry Eyes, the first science fiction anthology of original material.) The following year, Avon's printer, J.W. Clements, suggested to Meyers the idea of a pulp magazine which included a few pages of comics. Meyers asked Wollheim to try the idea, thinking that the additional section might draw comics readers to buy a pulp magazine, and in July 1950 Wollheim duly launched Sparkling Love Stories and Out of This World Adventures. The romance magazine was cancelled after a single issue because of poor sales; but Out of This World Adventures seemed promising enough to try a second issue, which appeared in December 1950, along with a third magazine in the part-comic format: Pioneer Western. Neither sold well enough to extend their runs any further.

Donald A. Wollheim was the editor for both issues. His editorial policy was slanted towards interplanetary fiction, according to his editorial in the first issue. The magazine included stories by several writers who were either already well-known or who would go on to more success; the first issue featured A.E. van Vogt, Lester del Rey, Kris Neville, William Tenn, Mack Reynolds, Ray Cummings and A. Bertram Chandler. Science fiction historians Mike Ashley and Wendy Bousfield both regard Tenn's story, "The Puzzle of Priipiirii", as the best in the magazine. The 32-page comics section, which was taken directly from an existing Avon comic called Out of This World, included comics written by John Michel and Gardner Fox; the latter, a pastiche of Robert E. Howard's "Conan" stories, was titled "Crom the Barbarian" and was illustrated by John Giunta. Michel, like Wollheim a member of the Futurians, a group of sf fans and aspiring writers, wrote the lead comic for both issues, though the second issue of the Canadian edition used a different comic section than the U.S. edition. The interior artwork was the responsibility of Avon's art director, rather than Wollheim, and illustrators such as William McWilliam, who worked on Avon's comics, were used.

== Bibliographic details ==
Out of This World Adventures was intended to be bi-monthly, but only two issues were produced, dated July and December 1950. It was priced at 25 cents for both issues; each issue was 128 pages and was in pulp format. The publisher was Avon Periodicals for both issues. A Canadian edition appeared, also priced at 25 cents; the cover of the Canadian edition omitted the dates, but the issues appeared in November 1950 and April 1951.

== Sources ==
- Ashley, Michael (1976). The History of the Science Fiction Magazine Vol. 3 1946–1955. Chicago: Contemporary Books, Inc. ISBN 0-8092-7842-1.
- Ashley, Mike (2000). The Time Machines:The Story of the Science-Fiction Pulp Magazines from the beginning to 1950. Liverpool: Liverpool University Press. ISBN 0-85323-865-0.
- Ashley, Mike (2005). Transformations: The Story of the Science Fiction Magazines from 1950 to 1970. Liverpool: Liverpool University Press. ISBN 0-85323-779-4.
- Bousfield, Wendy (1985). "Out of This World Adventures". In Tymn, Marshall B.; Ashley, Mike (eds.). Science Fiction, Fantasy, and Weird Fiction Magazines. Westport CT: Greenwood Press. pp. 467–471. ISBN 0-313-21221-X.
- Davin, Eric Leif (2006). Partners in Wonder: Women and the Birth of Science Fiction 1926–1965. Lanham MD: Lexington Books. ISBN 978-0-7391-1267-0.
- Dinan, John A. (1983). The Pulp Western. Boalsburg PA: Borgo Press. ISBN 1-59393-003-8.
- Nevins, Jess (2007). Pulp Magazine Holdings Directory: Library Collections in North America and Europe. Jefferson NC: McFarland & Company. ISBN 978-0-7864-3068-0.
