= William Clayton (publisher) =

William Mann Clayton (July 14, 1884, London, England – April 5, 1946, New York City) was an American pulp magazine publisher. His company published Snappy Stories, a men's magazine which was launched in 1912. He published many western pulps, and in 1930 launched Astounding Stories, which is still being published as of 2023 under the title Analog Science Fiction and Fact.
