= Space Stories =

US pulp science fiction magazine

Cover of the February 1953 issue by Emsh, showing three of the stereotypes of sf art: "the spaceman, the voluptuous blonde, and the threatening bug-eyed monster"

Space Stories was a pulp magazine which published five issues from October 1952 to June 1953. It was published by Standard Magazines, and edited by Samuel Mines. Mines' editorial policy for Space Stories was to publish straightforward science fiction adventure stories. Among the better-known contributors were Jack Vance, Gordon R. Dickson and Leigh Brackett, whose novel The Big Jump appeared in the February 1953 issue.

== Publication history and contents ==
The early 1950s saw dramatic changes in the world of U.S. science fiction (sf) publishing. At the start of 1949, all but one of the major magazines in the field were in pulp format; by the end of 1955, almost all had either ceased publication or switched to digest format. Despite the rapid decline of the pulp market, several new science fiction magazines were launched in pulp format during these years. Space Stories was one of the last of these; it was launched in October 1952 by Standard Magazines, which already published three other sf magazines: Startling Stories, Thrilling Wonder Stories, and Fantastic Story Magazine. Samuel Mines, the editor, had worked for Standard Magazines since 1942, though not on the science fiction pulps; he had taken over the editorship of the sf titles when Sam Merwin left Standard in 1951.

In the first issue, Mines declared that Space Stories' editorial policy would be focused on entertainment: it would be aimed at readers "who want action and thrills, strange and exotic backgrounds, weird and wonderful adventure", instead of the "coldly mental story, the complex parable, the tale of social significance". The response in the letters column of the magazine was positive, with several fans quoting Mines' editorial approvingly. Mines was able to obtain stories from well-known writers, including Gordon R. Dickson, Leigh Brackett, Jack Vance, and William Morrison, though few of the stories were memorable. The best-known story published in the magazine was Brackett's The Big Jump, which appeared in the February 1953 issue. Sf historian Wendy Bousfield regards most of the lesser-known stories in the magazine as uninteresting, but praises Robert Zack's "Expedition to Earth", which is set in a "science fiction restaurant" where the alien staff are assumed to be merely wearing costumes, as a witty variation on the stereotypical hostile alien story. Bousfield also singles out Charles Foster's "The Satyr Stratagem" as an example of an old-fashioned sexist science fiction plot. In the story, a planet inhabited only by women welcomes a team of earth miners who will provide husbands for them. Bousfield comments that Joanna Russ and James Tiptree, Jr. would later "expose the absurdities of this stock science fictional situation". In addition to the letter column, Mines included articles and essays on science. A book review column appeared in the April 1953 issue; it did not appear in the next and final issue, which instead included some science-fictional cartoons.

The interior art was of generally good quality; the artists included Paul Orban, Virgil Finlay, Emsh, and Alex Schomburg. The cover art, by Emsh, Earle K. Bergey, and Walter Popp, was stereotypical, with Emsh's cover for the February 1953 issue including what sf historian Wendy Bousfield describes as the three stereotypes of sf art: "the spaceman, the voluptuous blonde, and the threatening bug-eyed monster". Only the final issue's cover, also by Emsh, was painted to illustrate one of the stories inside the magazine. Bergey died in 1952, and his cover for the December 1952 issue was the last cover he painted for Standard.

== Bibliographic details ==
	Jan	Feb	Mar	Apr	May	Jun	Jul	Aug	Sep	Oct	Nov	Dec
1952										1/1		1/2
1953		1/3		2/1		2/2						
Issues of Space Stories, showing volume/issue number. Samuel Mines was editor throughout.

Space Stories had one volume of three numbers, and a second volume of two numbers. It appeared on a regular bimonthly schedule. All five were published by Standard Magazines of Kokomo, Indiana, and edited by Samuel Mines. Each issue was in pulp format, priced at 25 cents, and 128 pages long.

== Sources ==
- Ashley, Mike (2000). The Time Machines:The Story of the Science-Fiction Pulp Magazines from the beginning to 1950. Liverpool: Liverpool University Press. ISBN 0-85323-865-0.
- Ashley, Mike (2005). Transformations:The Story of the Science-Fiction Magazines from 1950 to 1970. Liverpool: Liverpool University Press. ISBN 0-85323-779-4.
- Bousfield, Wendy (1985). "Space Stories". In Tymn, Marshall B.; Ashley, Mike (eds.). Science Fiction, Fantasy, and Weird Fiction Magazines. Westport, Connecticut: Greenwood Press. pp. 591–599. ISBN 0-313-21221-X.
