= Captain Future (magazine) =

US pulp science fiction magazine

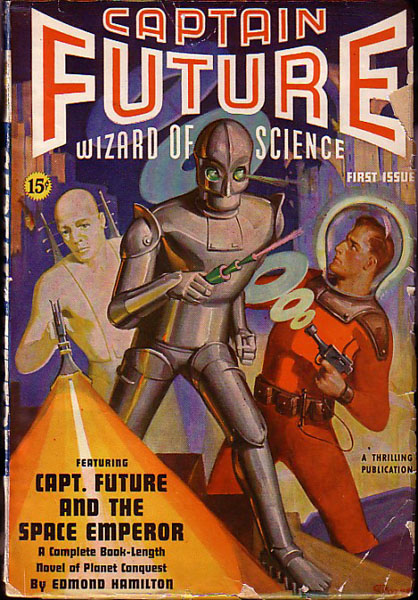
The premiere issue, published in 1940 and painted by George Rozen

Captain Future was a science fiction pulp magazine launched in 1940 by Better Publications, and edited initially by Mort Weisinger. It featured the adventures of Captain Future, a super-scientist whose real name was Curt Newton, in every issue. All but two of the novels in the magazine were written by Edmond Hamilton; the other two were by Joseph Samachson. The magazine also published other stories unrelated to the title character, including Fredric Brown's first science fiction sale, "Not Yet the End".

Captain Future published unabashed space opera, and was, in the words of science fiction historian Mike Ashley, "perhaps the most juvenile" of the science fiction pulps to appear in the early years of World War II. Wartime paper shortages eventually led to the magazine's cancellation: the last issue was dated Spring 1944.

== Publication history and contents ==
Although science fiction (sf) had been published before the 1920s, it did not begin to coalesce into a separately marketed genre until the appearance in 1926 of Amazing Stories, a pulp magazine published by Hugo Gernsback. By the end of the 1930s, the field was booming. Better Publications, a pulp magazine publisher which had acquired Thrilling Wonder Stories in 1936, launched three new magazines as part of this boom. The first two were Startling Stories, which appeared in January 1939, and Strange Stories, which began the following month; both were edited by Mort Weisinger, who was also the editor of Thrilling Wonder Stories. Edmond Hamilton, an established science fiction writer, met with Leo Margulies, Better Publication's editorial director, in early 1939, and they subsequently planned the launch of a new magazine with the lead character of Curt Newton, a super-scientist who lived on the moon and went by the name "Captain Future". The original idea for the character may have come from Weisinger. Margulies announced the new magazine at the first World Science Fiction Convention, held in New York in July 1939, and the first issue, edited by Weisinger, appeared in January of the following year. Captain Future's companions in the series included an enormously strong robot named Grag, an android named Otho, and the brain of Simon Wright, Newton's mentor. Joan Randall, Newton's girlfriend, was also a regular character. Better Publications followed up the magazine launch with a companion comic, Startling Comics, which appeared in May 1940; Captain Future was the protagonist of the lead story. Weisinger left in 1941 to edit comics following the adventures of Superman, and was replaced by Oscar J. Friend.

Captain Future was a hero pulp: these were pulps which were built around a central character, with every issue containing a lead story featuring that character. (Note: Captain Future was the only hero pulp which was also a science fiction magazine, though a couple of other hero pulps, such as Captain Hazzard and Captain Zero, did include some science fictional material. Flash Gordon also appeared in a one off magazine bearing his own name.) Every issue of Captain Future contained a novel about Curt Newton. Hamilton was willing to write the lead novel for every issue, but was concerned that he might be drafted, so Margulies made arrangements for other writers to contribute the lead stories. Hamilton escaped the draft, but Margulies had already made arrangements for other writers to work on the series, and so two of the seventeen lead novels in the magazine were written by Joseph Samachson, instead of by Hamilton. The house name "Brett Sterling" was invented to conceal the identity of the new writer; it was used for both of Samachson's contributions, as well as some of Hamilton's. Hamilton also wrote regular features that provided background material on the stories: "Worlds of Tomorrow" provided information about the planets featured in the stories, and "The Futuremen" covered Newton's companions. In addition to the novels about Curt Newton, Captain Future published both new and reprinted science fiction stories that were unconnected with the lead character. Fredric Brown's first sf sale, "Not Yet the End", appeared in the Winter 1941 issue; and Weisinger reprinted David H. Keller's The Human Termites and Laurence Manning's The Man Who Awoke, both abridged, in the first few issues of the magazine; these had originally appeared in 1929 and 1933, respectively, and were from back issues of Wonder Stories, which Better Publications had acquired the rights to in 1936. The magazine was unashamedly focused on straightforward space opera: a typical plot saw Captain Future and his friends save the Solar System, or perhaps the entire universe, from a villain. Sf historian Mike Ashley describes the magazine as "perhaps the most juvenile" of the World War II crop of science fiction pulps. Wartime paper shortages killed the magazine in mid-1944, but more Captain Future novels saw print in Startling Stories, some over the next two years, with more following in 1950 and 1951. In Sweden, the weekly pulp magazine Jules Verne Magasinet, launched in 1940, reprinted all the Captain Future stories, along with much other American pulp fiction, and as a result Sweden developed a group of fans of Captain Future.

== Bibliographic details ==
	Winter	Spring	Summer	Fall
1940	1/1	1/2	1/3	2/1
1941	2/2	2/3	3/1	3/2
1942	3/3	4/1	4/2	4/3
1943	5/1	5/2	5/3	
1944	6/1	6/2		
Issues of Captain Future from 1940 to 1944, showing issue numbers, and indicating editors: Weisinger (blue, first seven issues), and Friend (yellow, remaining ten issues).

Captain Future was pulp format, 128 pages, and was priced at 15 cents; the first seven issues were edited by Mort Weisinger, and the remaining ten by Oscar J. Friend. There were three issues to a volume. The schedule was quarterly, with one omission: there was no Fall 1943 issue. The publisher was Better Publications, with offices in Chicago and New York, for all issues. The magazine was subtitled "Wizard of Science" for the first four issues; after that the subtitle was "Man of Tomorrow," a name that had already been used by the Superman franchise for their hero.

Thirteen Captain Future novels were reprinted as paperbacks at the end of the 1960s, all by Popular Library. Ten of these, all printed in 1969, were originally printed in Captain Future as follows:

Serial #	Title	Original issue	Notes
2389	Quest Beyond the Stars	Winter 1942	
2399	Outlaws of the Moon	Spring 1942	
2407	The Comet Kings	Summer 1942	
2416	Planets in Peril	Fall 1942	
2421	Calling Captain Future	Spring 1940	
2430	Captain Future's Challenge	Summer 1940	
2437	Galaxy Mission	Fall 1940	Magazine version titled "The Triumph of Captain Future".
2445	The Tenth Planet	Spring 1944	By Joseph Samachson. Magazine version titled "Days of Creation".
2450	The Magician of Mars	Summer 1941	
2457	Captain Future and the Space Emperor	Winter 1940	

== Sources ==
- Ashley, Michael (1978). "Pulps and magazines". In Holdstock, Robert (ed.). Encyclopedia of Science Fiction. London: Octopus Books. ISBN 0-7064-0756-3.
- Ashley, Michael; Ewald, Robert (1985). "Captain Future". In Tymn, Marshall B.; Ashley, Mike (eds.). Science Fiction, Fantasy, and Weird Fiction Magazines. Westport, Connecticut: Greenwood Press. pp. 155–157. ISBN 0-313-21221-X.
- Currey, L.W. (1979). Science Fiction and Fantasy Authors: A Bibliography of First Printings of Their Fiction and Selected Nonfiction. Boston: G.K. Hall & Co. ISBN 0-8161-8242-6.
- Edwards, Malcolm; Nicholls, Peter (1992). "SF Magazines". In Clute, John; Nicholls, Peter (eds.). Encyclopedia of Science Fiction. New York: St. Martin's Press, Inc. ISBN 0-312-09618-6.
- Gombert, Richard W. (2009). The World Wrecker: An Annotated Bibliography of Edmond Hamilton. Wildside Press. ISSN 0749-470X.
- Holmberg, John-Henri; Lundwall, Sam (1985). "Sweden". In Tymn, Marshall B.; Ashley, Mike (eds.). Science Fiction, Fantasy, and Weird Fiction Magazines. Westport, Connecticut: Greenwood Press. pp. 895–897. ISBN 0-313-21221-X.
- Jones, Gerard (2005). Men of Tomorrow. Cambridge, Massachusetts: Basic Books. ISBN 978-0-465-03657-8.
- Moskowitz, Sam (1974) [1966]. Seekers of Tomorrow. Westport, Connecticut: Hyperion. ISBN 0-88355-158-6.
- Sherman, Philip (2017). Leo Margulies: Giant of the Pulps. Westport, Connecticut: Altus Press. ISBN 9781618272980.
- Weinberg, Robert; Ewald, Robert (1985a). "Captain Hazzard". In Tymn, Marshall B.; Ashley, Mike (eds.). Science Fiction, Fantasy, and Weird Fiction Magazines. Westport, Connecticut: Greenwood Press. pp. 158. ISBN 0-313-21221-X.
- Weinberg, Robert; Ewald, Robert (1985b). "Captain Zero". In Tymn, Marshall B.; Ashley, Mike (eds.). Science Fiction, Fantasy, and Weird Fiction Magazines. Westport, Connecticut: Greenwood Press. pp. 158–159. ISBN 0-313-21221-X.
