= Wonder Story Annual =

US pulp science fiction magazine

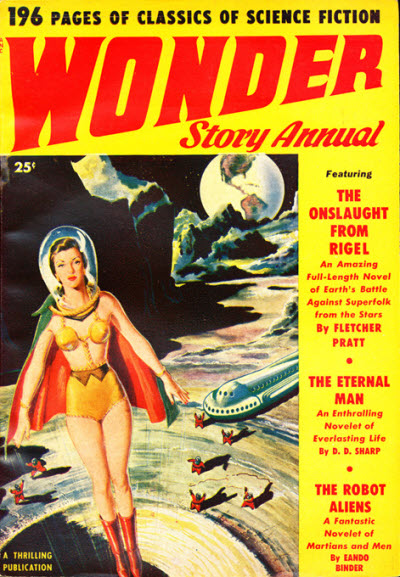
Cover of the 1950 issue of Wonder Story Annual

Wonder Story Annual was a science fiction pulp magazine which was launched in 1950 by Standard Magazines. It was created as a vehicle to reprint stories from early issues of Wonder Stories, Startling Stories, and Wonder Stories Quarterly, which were owned by the same publisher. It lasted for four issues, succumbing in 1953 to competition from the growing market for paperback science fiction. Reprinted stories included Twice in Time, by Manly Wade Wellman, and "The Brain-Stealers of Mars", by John W. Campbell.

== Publication history and contents ==
The first science fiction (sf) magazine, Amazing Stories, was launched in 1926 by Hugo Gernsback at the height of the pulp magazine era. It helped to form science fiction as a separately marketed genre, and by the mid-1930s several more sf magazines had appeared, including Wonder Stories, also published by Gernsback. In 1936, Ned Pines of Beacon Publications bought Wonder Stories from Gernsback, changed the title to Thrilling Wonder Stories, and in 1939 and 1940 added two more sf titles: Startling Stories and Captain Future. Pines had acquired reprint rights to the fiction published in Wonder Stories as part of the transaction, and some of this material ran in Startling Stories and Captain Future, but neither magazine had room for some of the longer stories in the backfile. At the end of the 1940s a boom in science fiction magazines encouraged Pines to issue a new magazine, titled Fantastic Story Quarterly, as a vehicle for reprinting this older material, with the first issue dated Spring 1950. It was successful enough for Pines to add another reprint magazine, Wonder Story Annual, later that year. Pines' plan was to use the new magazine to reprint novels, with only a few short stories included to fill out the magazine. The first issue was dated 1950 and appeared in the summer of that year.

The reprinted novels were Twice in Time, by Manly Wade Wellman; Gateway to Paradise, by Jack Williamson; The Onslaught from Rigel, by Fletcher Pratt (titled Invaders from Rigel when it eventually saw publication in book form in 1960), and The Death of Iron, by S.S. Held, a French writer (the novel was translated into English by Pratt for the original serialization in Wonder Stories, which began in 1932). The magazine also reprinted some shorter material, including "The Brain-Stealers of Mars" by John W. Campbell, "Nothing Sirius" by Fredric Brown, "The Irritated People" by Ray Bradbury, and "The Eternal Man", by D.D. Sharp, which combined Sharp's earlier "The Eternal Man", from the August 1929 Science Wonder with "The Eternal Man Revives" from the Summer 1930 Wonder Stories Quarterly. Although Wonder Story Annual was well-received and initially successful, it faced strong competition for sf readers from paperbacks, including reprint anthologies. In response it labelled itself "America's Best Science Fiction Anthology", but by 1953 the battle was lost, and that year's issue was the last.

== Bibliographic details ==
The magazine was issued annually for four years, from 1950 to 1953. The editor was Sam Merwin for the first two issues, and Samuel Mines for the second two. There was a single volume of three issues, followed by a final volume of one issue. The magazine was in pulp format and was priced at 25 cents; the first issue was 196 pages and the remaining three all had 160 pages. The publisher was Better Publications of Chicago and New York for the first issue, and Best Books, of Kokomo, Indiana, for the next three; Better Publications was an imprint of Standard Magazines of New York, and Best Books was owned by Standard.

A Canadian edition of the first issue appeared from Better Publications in Toronto with the same contents as the U.S. edition.

== Sources ==
- Ashley, Mike (1985a). "Fantastic Story Quarterly". In Tymn, Marshall B.; Ashley, Mike (eds.). Science Fiction, Fantasy, and Weird Fiction Magazines. Westport, Connecticut: Greenwood Press. pp. 249–250. ISBN 0-313-21221-X.
- Ashley, Mike (1985b). "Wonder Story Annual". In Tymn, Marshall B.; Ashley, Mike (eds.). Science Fiction, Fantasy, and Weird Fiction Magazines. Westport, Connecticut: Greenwood Press. pp. 766–767. ISBN 0-313-21221-X.
- Ashley, Mike (2000). The Time Machines:The Story of the Science-Fiction Pulp Magazines from the beginning to 1950. Liverpool: Liverpool University Press. ISBN 0-85323-865-0.
- Ashley, Mike (2005). Transformations:The Story of the Science-Fiction Magazines from 1950 to 1970. Liverpool: Liverpool University Press. ISBN 0-85323-779-4.
- Gammell, Leon L. (1986). The Annotated Guide to Startling Stories. Mercer Island, Washington: Wildside Press. ISBN 0-930261-51-8.
