= Captain Future =

Pulp science fiction character

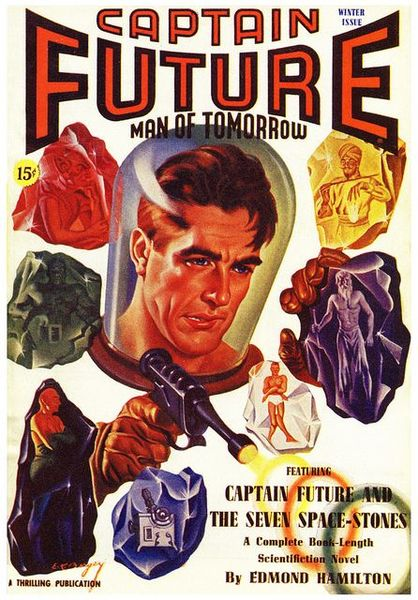
- Close-up portrait cover by Earle K. Bergey, Winter 1941

Publication information
- Publisher: Thrilling Publications
- First appearance: Captain Future (1940)
- Created by: Mort Weisinger; Leo Margulies

In-story information
- Alter ego: Curtis Newton
- Supporting character of: Grag; Otho; Prof. Simon Wright; Joan Randall; Marshall Ezra Gurney; Ul Quorn

Captain Future is a pulp science fiction hero – a space-traveling scientist and adventurer – originally published in the United States in his namesake pulp magazine from 1940 to 1944. The character was created by editors Mort Weisinger and Leo Margulies. The majority of the stories were authored by Edmond Hamilton. A number of adaptations and derivative works followed.

A 1978–79 Japanese anime (キャプテン・フューチャー) was dubbed into several languages, including Spanish, French, German, Italian and Arabic. His francophone name is Capitaine Futur, although he is better known in Francophone countries under the name Capitaine Flam.

== Origins ==
Although sometimes mistakenly attributed to science fiction writer Edmond Hamilton, who indeed authored most of the Captain Future stories, the character was created by Better Publications editors Mort Weisinger and Leo Margulies before the 1st World Science Fiction Convention in 1939 and then announced there.

The original character was published by Ned Pines' Thrilling/Standard/Better publications company. A different Captain Future was published in Pine's Nedor Comics line.

== Stories and art ==
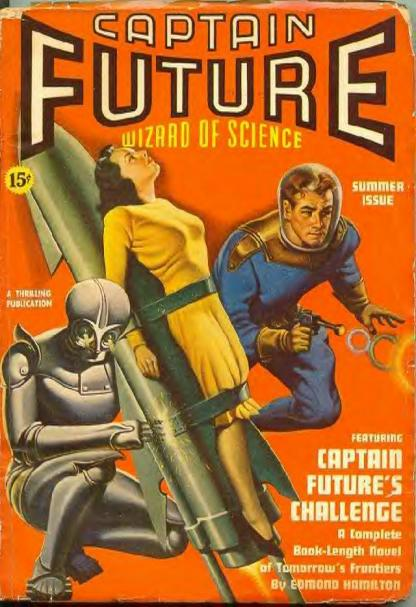
Third issue featuring Earle K. Bergey's debut art for the title.

The stories were published in American pulp magazines from 1940 to 1951, featuring bright-colored cover illustrations by Earle K. Bergey and two fellow pulp artists. Captain Future's originating adventures appeared in his namesake magazine, which ran from 1940 to 1944, coinciding with World War II. Bergey painted twelve of the seventeen Captain Future covers, and all ten subsequent Startling Stories covers under which additional Captain Future novels and novelettes were published. Of note, Bergey's art for Captain Future, beginning with the third issue, marks the start of his groundbreaking work in the fields of science fiction and fantasy illustration.

While the first four issues of the Captain Future pulp are subtitled "Wizard of Science", the remaining thirteen issues bear the header, "Man of Tomorrow", shifting focus to the humanity of the titular hero, whose given name is Curtis Newton. A brilliant scientist and adventurer, Newton roams the solar system as Captain Future—solving problems, righting wrongs, and vanquishing futuristic supervillains. Published by Better Publications, an imprint of the expansive Thrilling Group of pulps, Captain Future gave readers the only explicitly science fiction and fantasy pulp hero in the history of American pulps.

The series makes assumptions about the Solar System which are outlandish by modern standards but which still seemed plausible, at least to most readers, when the stories were written. Every one of the planets of the Solar System, and many of the moons and asteroids, are suitable for life; most are occupied by humanoid extraterrestrials. The initial adventures take place in the planets of the Solar System. Later installments (after Captain Future invents the "vibration drive") take the hero to other stars, other dimensions and even the distant past and almost to the end of the Universe. As an example, they visit the planet Aar in the Deneb system, which is the origin planet for Earth humans, as well as many other humanoids across the Solar System and beyond.

== Story overview ==
Map of the Denebian Aar, from the 1943 Captain Future story "Star of Dread".

Initially, the story was set in 1990. Hamilton quickly avoided exact dates except for past events, such as the voyages of the astronauts who first landed on most of the other planets of the Solar System. In later stories, if the date was asked or revealed, it was done so discreetly.

The series begins when genius scientist Roger Newton, his wife Elaine, and his fellow scientist Simon Wright leave planet Earth to do research in an isolated laboratory on the Moon, and to escape the predations of Victor Corvo (originally: Victor Kaslan), a criminal politician who wished to use Newton's inventions for his own gain. Simon's body is old and diseased and Roger enables him to continue doing research by transplanting his healthy brain into an artificial case (originally immobile—carried around by Grag—later equipped with lifter units). Working together, the two scientists create an intelligent robot called Grag, and an android with shape-shifting abilities called Otho. One day, Corvo arrives on the Moon and murders the Newtons; but before he can reap the fruits of his atrocity, Corvo and his killers are in turn slain by Grag and Otho.

A Captain Future cover from Startling Stories January 1950, painted by Earle K. Bergey.

The deaths of the Newtons leave their son, Curtis, to be raised by the unlikely trio of Otho, Grag, and Simon Wright. Under their tutelage, Curtis grows up to be a brilliant scientist and as strong and fast as any champion athlete. He also grows up with a strong sense of responsibility and hopes to use his scientific skills to help people. With that goal in his mind, he calls himself Captain Future; Simon, Otho and Grag are referred to as the Futuremen in subsequent stories. Other recurring characters in the series are the old space marshal Ezra Gurney, the beautiful Planet Patrol agent Joan Randall (who provides a love interest for Curtis), and James Carthew, President of the Solar System whose office is in New York City and who calls upon Future in extreme need.

Captain Future faces many enemies in his career but his archenemy is Ul Quorn, who is the only recurring villain in the series and appears in two different stories. He is part Martian – therefore called the Magician of Mars – but also the son of Victor Corvo, who murdered the Newtons. Quorn is a scientist whose abilities rival those of Captain Future.

== Stories ==
Issue	Story Title	Author	Publication Title	Publication Date	Notes
1	"Captain Future and the Space Emperor"	Edmond Hamilton	Captain Future	Winter 1940	Reprinted under the same title
2	"Calling Captain Future"	Edmond Hamilton	Captain Future	Spring 1940	Reprinted under the same title
3	"Captain Future's Challenge"	Edmond Hamilton	Captain Future	Summer 1940	Reprinted under the same title
4	"The Triumph of Captain Future"	Edmond Hamilton	Captain Future	Fall 1940	Reprinted as "Galaxy Mission"
5	"Captain Future and the Seven Space-Stones"	Edmond Hamilton	Captain Future	Winter 1941	
6	"Star Trail to Glory"	Edmond Hamilton	Captain Future	Spring 1941	
7	"The Magician of Mars"	Edmond Hamilton	Captain Future	Summer 1941	Reprinted under the same title
8	"The Lost World of Time"	Edmond Hamilton	Captain Future	Fall 1941	
9	"Quest Beyond the Stars"	Edmond Hamilton	Captain Future	Winter 1942	Reprinted under the same title
10	"Outlaws of the Moon"	Edmond Hamilton	Captain Future	Spring 1942	Reprinted under the same title
11	"The Comet Kings"	Edmond Hamilton	Captain Future	Summer 1942	Reprinted under the same title
12	"Planets in Peril"	Edmond Hamilton	Captain Future	Fall 1942	Reprinted under the same title
13	"The Face of the Deep"	Edmond Hamilton	Captain Future	Winter 1943	
14	"Worlds to Come"	Joseph Samachson (as William Morrison)	Captain Future	Spring 1943	
15	"Star of Dread"	Edmond Hamilton	Captain Future	Summer 1943	
16	"Magic Moon"	Edmond Hamilton	Captain Future	Winter 1944	
17	"Days of Creation"	Joseph Samachson (as William Morrison)	Captain Future	Spring 1944	Reprinted as "The Tenth Planet"
18	"Red Sun of Danger"	Edmond Hamilton	Startling Stories	Spring 1945	Reprinted as "Danger Planet"
19	"Outlaw World"	Edmond Hamilton	Startling Stories	Winter 1946	Reprinted under the same title
20	"The Solar Invasion"	Manly Wade Wellman	Startling Stories	Fall 1946	Reprinted under the same title
SS01	"The Return of Captain Future"	Edmond Hamilton	Startling Stories	January 1950	
SS02	"Children of the Sun"	Edmond Hamilton	Startling Stories	May 1950	
SS03	"The Harpers of Titan"	Edmond Hamilton	Startling Stories	September 1950	Reprinted as part of Doctor Cyclops
SS04	"Pardon My Iron Nerves"	Edmond Hamilton	Startling Stories	November 1950	
SS05	"Moon of the Unforgotten"	Edmond Hamilton	Startling Stories	January 1951	
SS06	"Earthmen No More"	Edmond Hamilton	Startling Stories	March 1951	
SS07	"Birthplace of Creation"	Edmond Hamilton	Startling Stories	May 1951	
Side Story	"Treasure on Thunder Moon"	Edmond Hamilton	Amazing Stories	April 1942	See explanation in notes below.
Side Story	"Forgotten World"	Edmond Hamilton	Thrilling Wonder Stories	Winter 1946	See explanation in notes below

Notes
- Stories #14–17 were credited to the newly-created house name "Brett Sterling"
- Stories SS1–7 were short stories taking place a few years later in 'continuity'.
- Not a Captain Future story per se, the short story "Treasure on Thunder Moon" features the 'final' adventure of the survivors of the crews of several early explorers prominently listed in the Future novels (Gorham Johnson, Mark Carew, Jan Wenzi and others) marking as a side story to the Future series. The Futuremen themselves visit the Thunder Moon during Captain Future's Challenge.
- Not Captain Future story per se, the short novel Forgotten World takes place circa 2,000 years in the future of the Futurian universe. Mentions are made of the original explorers of solarian space (Carew, Wenzi and others) named in the Worlds of Tomorrow back feature in issues of CF.
- A number of issues were reprinted in paperback in the 1960s, as noted above. One had a Frank Frazetta cover, several had Jeff Jones art. Several, including one which also reprinted the text of Henry Kuttner's short novelization of the film Doctor Cyclops, used covers from Perry Rhodan (a long-lived serialized space opera).
- With Popular pulps, Winter was the first season/quarter of the year (Winter, Spring, Summer, Fall).
- All stories (excepting Treasure on Thunder Moon and Forgotten World) have been reprinted as ebooks in a number of formats.

== Characters ==
Captain Future
Tall, athletic and handsome, with red hair, Captain Future was born on the Moon as Curtis Newton. After the death of his parents, he was trained by Professor Simon, Otho and Grag in all scientific and athletic pursuits necessary to fight crime and injustice across the Solar System.
Prof. Simon Wright
A human brain living in a transparent, nuclear-powered life support case, with tentacle-mounted optics. He is Captain Future's mentor and chief consultant in scientific matters.
Grag and Otho
Grag is a seven-foot-tall metallic robot. Otho is a white-skinned android. Both were created by Roger Newton with artificial intelligence and human emotions to be friends and helpers to mankind. Grag and Otho have a friendly rivalry. Grag is big and strong, but not very bright, while Otho is quick-witted, agile, and (with the aid of a special chemical) able to alter his physical appearance.
Eek and Oog
Grag and Otho's pets, respectively. Eek is a "moonpup", a canine creature which does not need air to survive and consumes soft metals for food. Oog is an amorphous being called a mimic, an artificially created pet that can change its shape as Otho does. Both are telepathic, and are attached to their respective master.
Joan Randall
A beautiful female agent of the Planetary Police on Earth. She has brunette hair (blonde in the anime adaptation). She shares a mutual romantic attraction with Curtis, but their respective duties prevent them from taking their relationship further.
Marshall Ezra Gurney
A high-ranking veteran officer in the Planetary Police.
Ul Quorn
Son of Victor Corvo, the man who murdered Captain Future's parents. A scientific genius, he has chosen to use his intellect for evil purposes.
Johnny Kirk
An orphan boy and a dedicated fan of the Futuremen. During his debut appearance in "The Magician of Mars", he impresses Captain Future with his determination to become one of his crew, and is later entrusted to Joan and the Planetary Police to be trained as a future crew-member. He has an expanded role and different name (Ken Scott) in the anime.

== Technology ==
Captain Future's spaceship, named the Comet, has been designed by himself and is superior to all other spaceships in the Solar System. A research ship, the Comet has a compact on-board laboratory. It is also equipped with a camouflage device giving it the appearance of an actual comet, and armed with "proton cannons". She only receives faster-than-light propulsion late in the series of novels. In the animated series, she has a hyperspace drive (in the Japanese version referred to as Warp Engine) and also a small auxiliary shuttlecraft called the Cosmoliner.

== Adaptations and other derivative works ==
=== Anime ===
- Captain Future
- Screenshot from the anime series

キャプテン・フューチャー (Kyaputen Fyūchā)
- Genre: Adventure, science fiction
- Anime television series
- Directed by: Tomoharu Katsumata
- Written by: Masaki Tsuji
- Music by: Yuji Ohno
- Studio: Toei Animation
- Licensed by: US: ZIV International, Harmony Gold
- Original network: NHK General TV
- Original run: November 7, 1978 – December 18, 1979
- Episodes: 53

In 1978, one year after Hamilton's death, Japanese company Toei Animation produced a Captain Future (キャプテン・フューチャー, Kyaputen Fyūchā) anime television series of 53 episodes, based on 13 of the stories. Despite the differences in cultural references and medium, the animated series was true to the original in many ways, from the didactic scientific explanations to the emphasis on the usefulness of brains as opposed to brawn.

The series was translated in several languages and distributed globally. The four episodes comprising the series' second story arc were dubbed into English and released on video by ZIV International in the early 1980s as The Adventures of Captain Future. In the late 1980s, Harmony Gold dubbed the series' initial four-part story as an edited "TV movie" simply entitled Captain Future, but with alterations regarding some character names (different from those in Hamilton's stories – whether for licensing law or other reasons, remains a broad field for speculation). A Blu-ray Box in Japanese only was released in September, 2016 (Box 1) and November, 2016 (Box 2). A German "Limited Collectors Edition" Blu-ray Box was released in December 2016, featuring not only the remastered Japanese uncut version (with German subtitles) but also the heavily cut German version.

While only eight episodes in total were dubbed into English, the series met huge success particularly in Japan, France, where the title and lead character's name were changed to "Capitaine Flam", in Italy with the translated title of "Capitan Futuro", in Latin America and Spain with the title "Capitán Futuro", in Taiwan with the title "太空突擊隊" ("Space Commando"). The Arabic-language version has the title of فارس الفضاء (Faris al-Fadha'a, or "The Knight of Space") and was broadcast many times during the 1980s.

The series was also broadcast in Germany, where it appeared under its original title. However, this version was cut by about a quarter of the original length, which mainly affected violent scenes or those considered "expendable" for the storylines.

==== Score ====
The original incidental music was composed by Yuji Ohno, while the English-dubbed version had a new soundtrack composed by Mark Mercury. Mercury's work survived on the Latin American version, but a new opening was added for it, composed by Shuki Levy and sung by Chilean performer Juan Guillermo Aguirre (a.k.a. "Capitán Memo").

For the German version, a completely new soundtrack was created by German composer Christian Bruhn. To this day, the futuristic synth disco funk soundtrack is considered iconic for giving the series the right feeling. A soundtrack CD was released in 1995. A remix of the theme Feinde greifen an ("enemies attack") by German DJ Phil Fuldner, called "The Final", entered the top ten of the German and Austrian single charts in 1998.

==== Episodes ====
#	Chapters	Episodes	Directed by	Written by
1	恐怖の宇宙帝王 (Captain Future and the Space Emperor)	宇宙帝王現わる	Tomoharu Katsumata	Masaki Tsuji
2	恐怖の宇宙帝王 (Captain Future and the Space Emperor)	炎の海の牢獄	Tomoharu Katsumata	Masaki Tsuji
3	恐怖の宇宙帝王 (Captain Future and the Space Emperor)	天翔ける砦の奇蹟	Masahiro Sasaki	Masaki Tsuji
4	恐怖の宇宙帝王 (Captain Future and the Space Emperor)	衛星ヌーンの決戦	Masahiro Sasaki	Masaki Tsuji
5	時のロスト‧ワールド (The Lost World of Time)	SOS1億年前	Kozo Morishita	Masaki Tsuji
6	時のロスト‧ワールド (The Lost World of Time)	聖なる星クウムの謎	Tomoharu Katsumata	Masaki Tsuji
7	時のロスト‧ワールド (The Lost World of Time)	太陽系創世記	Hideki Takayama	Masaki Tsuji
8	時のロスト‧ワールド (The Lost World of Time)	遥かなり50億年の旅	Hideki Takayama	Masaki Tsuji
Special episode	謎の宇宙船強奪団 (Star Trail to Glory)	華麗なる太陽系レース (The Super Solar System Race)	Tomoharu Katsumata	Masaki Tsuji
9	挑戦！嵐の海底都市 (Captain Future's Challenge)	破壊王の陰謀	Kozo Morishita	Takeo Kaneko
10	挑戦！嵐の海底都市 (Captain Future's Challenge)	海底の罠	Kozo Morishita	Takeo Kaneko
11	挑戦！嵐の海底都市 (Captain Future's Challenge)	戦慄の海悪魔	Tomoharu Katsumata	Takeo Kaneko
12	挑戦！嵐の海底都市 (Captain Future's Challenge)	破壊王の謎	Kozo Morishita	Takeo Kaneko
13	輝く星々の彼方へ！ (The Quest beyond the Stars)	惑星に空気がなくなるとき	Directed by : Tomoharu Katsumata; Storyboarded by : Shigeho Hirota	Fumio Ishimori
14	輝く星々の彼方へ！ (The Quest beyond the Stars)	悲劇の暗黒星	Hideki Takayama	Fumio Ishimori
15	輝く星々の彼方へ！ (The Quest beyond the Stars)	見張りのおきて	Masahiro Sasaki	Fumio Ishimori
16	輝く星々の彼方へ！ (The Quest beyond the Stars)	甦える惑星	Johei Matsura	Fumio Ishimori
17	透明惑星危機一髪！ (The Magician of Mars)	ウル・クォルンの挑戦	Kozo Morishita	Hiroyuki Hoshiyama
18	透明惑星危機一髪！ (The Magician of Mars)	暗闇族のすむ地底	Johei Matsura	Hiroyuki Hoshiyama
19	透明惑星危機一髪！ (The Magician of Mars)	惑星ただ一人	Directed by : Shigeyasu Yamauchi; Storyboarded by : Yoshihiro Tomita	Hiroyuki Hoshiyama
20	透明惑星危機一髪！ (The Magician of Mars)	透明惑星の幻人間	Directed by : Hideki Takayama; Storyboarded by : Noboru Ishiguro	Hiroyuki Hoshiyama
21	太陽系七つの秘宝 (Captain Future and the Seven Space Stones)	銀河に眠る神秘の石	Akira Yokoi	Takeo Kaneko
22	太陽系七つの秘宝 (Captain Future and the Seven Space Stones)	銀河サーカスの死闘	Akira Yokoi	Takeo Kaneko
23	太陽系七つの秘宝 (Captain Future and the Seven Space Stones)	キャプテンフューチャー死す！	Directed by : Hideki Takayama; Storyboarded by : Akira Yokoi	Takeo Kaneko
24	太陽系七つの秘宝 (Captain Future and the Seven Space Stones)	未知のミクロ宇宙	Johei Matsura	Takeo Kaneko
25	暗黒星大接近！ (Calling Captain Future)	渦巻く墓標	Directed by : Tomoharu Katsumata; Storyboarded by : Isao Nakatsugawa	Masaki Tsuji
26	暗黒星大接近！ (Calling Captain Future)	吠える大氷流	Directed by : Shigeyasu Yamauchi; Storyboarded by : Isao Nakatsugawa	Masaki Tsuji
27	暗黒星大接近！ (Calling Captain Future)	怪獣狩人は語る	Masahiro Sasaki	Masaki Tsuji
28	暗黒星大接近！ (Calling Captain Future)	幻の星、幻の文明	Directed by : Hideki Takayama; Storyboarded by : Noboru Ishiguro	Masaki Tsuji
29	宇宙囚人船の反乱 (The Face of the Deep)	囚人船ハイジャックさる！	Directed by : Yasuo Hasegawa; Storyboarded by : Kozo Morishita	Ryunosuke Ono
30	宇宙囚人船の反乱 (The Face of the Deep)	銀河からの大脱走	Directed by : Shigeyasu Yamauchi; Storyboarded by : Yoshihiro Tomita	Ryunosuke Ono
31	宇宙囚人船の反乱 (The Face of the Deep)	ゼロからの出発	Directed by : Hideki Takayama; Storyboarded by : Noboru Ishiguro	Ryunosuke Ono
32	宇宙囚人船の反乱 (The Face of the Deep)	星くずのスペースマン	Johei Matsura	Ryunosuke Ono
33	魔法の月の決闘 (The Magic Moon)	キャプテンフューチャー募集！	Kozo Morishita	Takeo Kaneko
34	魔法の月の決闘 (The Magic Moon)	恐怖のスペース・ロケーション	Keisuke Koide	Takeo Kaneko
35	魔法の月の決闘 (The Magic Moon)	幻影の惑星	Hideki Takayama	Takeo Kaneko
36	魔法の月の決闘 (The Magic Moon)	放たれた最終兵器	Directed by : Yasuo Hasegawa; Storyboarded by : Kozo Morishita	Takeo Kaneko
37	彗星王の陰謀 (The Comet King)	消えた宇宙船	Yoshikatsu Kasai	Hiroyuki Hoshiyama
38	彗星王の陰謀 (The Comet King)	彗星の支配者	Johei Matsura	Hiroyuki Hoshiyama
39	彗星王の陰謀 (The Comet King)	アルルスの正体	Directed by : Shigeyasu Yamauchi; Storyboarded by : Noboru Ishiguro	Hiroyuki Hoshiyama
40	彗星王の陰謀 (The Comet King)	悪夢の世界・四次元	Directed by : Yasuo Hasegawa; Storyboarded by : Kozo Morishita	Hiroyuki Hoshiyama
41	脅威！不死密売団 (The Triumph of Captain Future)	不死密売シンジケート	Directed by : Hideki Takayama; Storyboarded by : Yoshihiro Tomita	Takeo Kaneko
42	脅威！不死密売団 (The Triumph of Captain Future)	不死帝王の挑戦	Keisuke Koide	Takeo Kaneko
43	脅威！不死密売団 (The Triumph of Captain Future)	生と死の幻影	Yoshikatsu Kasai	Takeo Kaneko
44	脅威！不死密売団 (The Triumph of Captain Future)	永遠の都の決斗	Johei Matsura	Takeo Kaneko
45	惑星タラスト救出せよ！ (Planets in Peril)	よみがえれ伝説の英雄	Directed by : Shigeyasu Yamauchi; Storyboarded by : Kozo Morishita	Masaki Tsuji
46	惑星タラスト救出せよ！ (Planets in Peril)	グラッグ奪回作戦	Hideki Takayama	Masaki Tsuji
47	惑星タラスト救出せよ！ (Planets in Peril)	ひとりぼっちの地獄刑	Shigeyasu Yamauchi	Masaki Tsuji
48	惑星タラスト救出せよ！ (Planets in Peril)	英雄カフールの謎	Yoshikatsu Kasai	Masaki Tsuji
49	人工進化の秘密！ (The Star of Dread)	宇宙遺跡の謎	Directed by : Shigeyasu Yamauchi; Storyboarded by : Noboru Ishiguro	Toyohiro Ando
50	人工進化の秘密！ (The Star of Dread)	半獣人の謎	Masahiro Sasaki	Toyohiro Ando
51	人工進化の秘密！ (The Star of Dread)	死都の対決	Johei Matsura	Toyohiro Ando
52	人工進化の秘密！ (The Star of Dread)	光と闇の彼方へ	Yoshikatsu Kasai	Toyohiro Ando

=== Related works by Allen Steele ===
"The Death of Captain Future" (Asimov's Science Fiction, October 1995) is a novella by American writer Allen Steele set in Steele's "Near Space" realistic near future setting of expansion into the Solar System. Here, Steele contrasts the more gritty setting with the naïvety of the titular character. In story, a man named Bo McKinnon collects "ancient pulp magazines" and acts out a fantasy life based on the Captain Future stories. The novella won the 1996 Hugo Award for Best Novella. An audio drama version of the story appeared as a play produced by Seeing Ear Theater. "The Exile of Evening Star" (Asimov's Science Fiction, January 1999) continues and concludes the story. It includes many quotes from the original magazines.

Steele's Avengers of the Moon: A Captain Future Novel (Tor Books 2017) is a continuity reboot which gently updates the narrative (including the science) to fit with a more modern sensibility. It was authorized by Hamilton's estate. The novel features the main characters from the original stories and presents a new origin story for its protagonist. The Return of Ul Quorn, a quartet novella series published by the revived Amazing Stories magazine, followed as the sequel of Avengers of the Moon; the first entitled Captain Future in Love (2019), the second entitled The Guns of Pluto (2020), the third entitled 1,500 Light Years from Home (2021), and the fourth entitled The Horror at Jupiter (2021). The Guns of Pluto included a reprint of Hamilton's story "The Harpers of Titan" and 1,500 Light Years from Home included a long-lost musical parody.

=== Comics ===
In the 1980s, German publisher Bastei-Verlag released a Captain Future comic series based on the anime series, with original adventures.

In February 2025, French comic artist Alexis Tallone and author Sylvian Runberg obtained permission from Toei Animation to release a Captain Future comic based on the first story, Captain Future and the Space Emperor. While the anime design of the characters is largely retained, several changes were made to reflect their pulp fiction origins and actual technological advances since the stories were first penned. Also, several plot elements were altered, including the main villain's true identity, the personal dynamic between Future and Joan, and the addressing of racism and social injustice.

=== Feature film ===
In March 2010, German director Christian Alvart (Pandorum, Case 39) secured the film rights for Captain Future and is working on a live-action adaptation in 3D.

In 2015, a short trailer of a CGI version of Captain Future by Prophecy FX was leaked. The trailer was said to be a study for a yet-undisclosed project. In March 2016, Chris Alvart confirmed in an interview on a RocketBeansTV podcast to have acquired the design rights from TOEI Animation so that the movie will have the look and feel of the animated series.

=== Other appearances ===
- The Japanese TV series Captain Ultra, a placeholder series between two actual Ultraman series, was more or less a live-action adaptation of the Captain Future series (which has remained popular in Japan as well). The characters were all present, even if the names were changed.
- In the German Netflix series Dark, Mikkel Nielsen is given a Captain Future magazine to occupy himself while he recuperates in hospital from injuries while cave exploring. When he tells the nurse looking after him he is from the future, his claims are simply dismissed as having an overactive imagination inspired by the magazine.
- In the TV series The Big Bang Theory, a Captain Future magazine cover is featured as a wall poster beside the entrance door in Leonard's and Sheldon's apartment.
- In Cat Planet Cuties, Episode 9 features a well known song from the anime television series of Captain Future.
- In the Pre-Crisis DC Comics, a character named Edmond Hamilton was featured as a minor adversary of Superman. This character, as a result of his homonymy with the science fiction author and his most famous work, took up the identity of Colonel Future and ended up battling Superman despite having heroic intentions. This character is a homage to the real Edmond Hamilton and his work in DC Comics.
- The Listeners by Maggie Stiefvater includes The Triumph of Captain Future in a list of reading material banned from the hotel.

== Moons of Pluto ==
In the story "Calling Captain Future", three (then undiscovered) moons of Pluto are named Charon, Styx, and Cerberus after mythological characters associated with the Greek god Pluto. Three of Pluto's five moons were ultimately given the names Charon, Styx, and Kerberos (the Greek spelling of Cerberus).

== See also ==
- Captain Comet
