= The Big Jump =

1955 novel by Leigh Brackett

- Author: Leigh Brackett
- Language: English
- Genre: Science fiction
- Publisher: Ace Books
- Publication date: 1955 (first book publication)
- Publication place: United States
- Media type: Print (Paperback)
- Pages: 131
- OCLC: 5282860

The Big Jump is a science fiction novel by American writer Leigh Brackett, centered on the first crewed expedition to Barnard's Star.

== Publication ==
The novel was first published in the February 1953 issue of Space Stories. Its first book publication was in the early Ace Double D-103 with Philip K. Dick's first novel, Solar Lottery.

== Summary ==
The novel begins with the entire Solar System waiting for the news of the first successful interstellar expedition to Barnard's Star, a mission named "The Big Jump". However, only one crewman, Ballantyne, returns, half-dead and with a body so changed he's barely human.

The protagonist Comyn attempts to uncover the truth about the Big Jump and his missing friend, crewman Paul Rogers. Comyn speaks with Ballantyne and gains valuable information about a planet around the star and what the crew had found there. In an attempt to rescue Rogers, he meets the Cochrane family, who have monopolized in-system travel. Comyn claims to know detailed information about the Star, leading the Cochrane family to build another starship. They send Comyn out to rescue the other crew members but Comyn suspects that one of his crew is planning to murder him...

== Reception ==
The Encyclopedia of Science Fiction described it as "efficient but seem somewhat routine when set beside Brackett's best single pure-sf work, The Long Tomorrow."
