= Mel Oliver and Space Rover on Mars =

1954 novel by Joseph Samachson

- Dust-jacket from the first edition
- Author: William Morrison
- Cover artist: Ric Binkley
- Language: English
- Genre: Science fiction
- Publisher: Gnome Press
- Publication date: 1954
- Publication place: United States
- Media type: Print (Hardback)
- Pages: 191
- OCLC: 5304913

Mel Oliver and Space Rover on Mars is a children's science fiction novel by American writer William Morrison (pseudonym of Joseph Samachson). It was published in 1954 by Gnome Press in an edition of 4,000 copies.

== Plot introduction ==
The novel concerns the adventures of a boy and his sapient dog as they join an interplanetary circus on a voyage to Mars.

== Reception ==
Anthony Boucher praised the novel as "the most enjoyable non-Heinlein s.f. for the young" in several years, describing Morrison's writing as "easy, lively, humorous and charming."

== Sources ==
- Chalker, Jack L.; Mark Owings (1998). The Science-Fantasy Publishers: A Bibliographic History, 1923-1998. Westminster, MD and Baltimore: Mirage Press, Ltd. p. 303.
- Tuck, Donald H. (1978). The Encyclopedia of Science Fiction and Fantasy. Chicago: Advent. p. 377. ISBN 0-911682-22-8.
