= Fantastic Story Quarterly =

US pulp science fiction magazine

Earle K. Bergey's cover for the January 1953 issue of Fantastic Story Magazine

Fantastic Story Quarterly was a pulp science fiction magazine, published from 1950 to 1955 by Best Books, a subsidiary imprint of Standard Magazines, based in Kokomo, Indiana. The name was changed with the Summer 1951 issue to Fantastic Story Magazine. It was launched to reprint stories from the early years of the science fiction pulp magazines, and was initially intended to carry no new fiction, though in the end every issue contained at least one new story. It was sufficiently successful for Standard to launch Wonder Story Annual as a vehicle for more science fiction reprints, but the success did not last. In 1955 it was merged with Standard's Startling Stories. Original fiction in Fantastic Story included Gordon R. Dickson's first sale, "Trespass", and stories by Walter M. Miller and Richard Matheson.

== Publication history and contents ==
The first science fiction (sf) magazine, Amazing Stories, was launched in 1926 by Hugo Gernsback at the height of the pulp magazine era. It helped to form science fiction as a separately marketed genre, and by the mid-1930s several more sf magazines had appeared, including Wonder Stories, also published by Gernsback. In 1936, Ned Pines of Beacon Publications bought Wonder Stories from Gernsback. Pines changed the title to Thrilling Wonder Stories, and in 1939 and 1940 added two more sf titles: Startling Stories and Captain Future. Pines had acquired reprint rights to the fiction published in Wonder Stories as part of the transaction, and he instituted a "Hall of Fame" department in Startling Stories to carry some of this material. Captain Future also carried reprint material, but neither Startling nor Captain Future had room for some of the longer stories in the backfile. At the end of the 1940s a boom in science fiction magazines encouraged Pines to issue a new magazine, titled Fantastic Story Quarterly, as a vehicle for reprinting this older material. The original plan was for the magazine to carry no new fiction, but this policy was changed shortly before publication, and at least one new story was included in every issue.

The initial schedule was quarterly. The magazine became popular with fans because of the access it gave them to old favorite stories, and it was immediately successful, soon becoming more popular than the other Standard Magazine science fiction pulps. The success led Standard to issue Wonder Story Annual in 1950 to provide an outlet for reprinting longer material. In late 1952 it switched to a bimonthly schedule, having changed its title to Fantastic Story Magazine the previous year, but this only lasted until the following year, by which time it was no longer doing well financially. It was back on a quarterly schedule starting with the Winter 1954 issue. The pulps were in rapid decline by the mid-1950s, and both Fantastic Story Magazine and Thrilling Wonder Stories were merged with Startling Stories in mid-1955, though Startling itself ceased publication at the end of that year.

The pulp format was intended to appeal to readers who were nostalgic for the early years of the science fiction pulp market. Sf historian Mike Ashley suggested that Pines was right to launch Fantastic Story Quarterly as a pulp; in Ashley's words, "Early pulp fiction somehow never reads right in book form. You need the crumbling paper, the smell of woodpulp, and the mixture of advertisements, illustrations and old pulp-style text to create the right atmosphere". Most of the contents were reprinted from Wonder Stories, but occasionally material from other publishers appeared, such as A.E. van Vogt's novel, Slan, which had originally appeared in Street and Smith's Astounding Science Fiction in 1940, and which was reprinted in Fantastic Story's Summer 1952 issue. New fiction included Richard Matheson's "Lazarus II", and Walter M. Miller's "A Family Matter". Fantastic Story also printed Gordon R. Dickson's first sale, "Trespass", a collaboration with Poul Anderson which appeared in the very first issue. In addition to fiction, there was an editorial page and a letter column. Illustrators whose work appeared in its pages included Virgil Finlay, Ed Emsh, and Earle Bergey.

== Bibliographic details ==
	Winter			Spring			Summer			Fall		
	Jan	Feb	Mar	Apr	May	Jun	Jul	Aug	Sep	Oct	Nov	Dec
1950				1/1			1/2			1/3		
1951	2/1			2/2			2/3			3/1		
1952	3/2			3/3			4/1		4/2		4/3	
1953	5/1		5/2		5/3		6/1		6/2			
1954	6/3			7/1			7/2			7/3		
1955	8/1			8/2								
Issues of Fantastic Story from 1950 to 1955, showing volume and issue numbers, and color-coded to show who was editor for each issue. The editors, in sequence, were Sam; Merwin, Samuel Mines, and Alexander Samalman. Underlining indicates that an issue was titled as a quarterly (e.g. "Winter 1954") rather than as a monthly.

The magazine was a quarterly for all but six issues, from November 1952 to September 1953. The title changed from Fantastic Story Quarterly to Fantastic Story Magazine with the fifth issue, and remained under that title through the end of its run, though the magazine was still a quarterly at the time the title changed. The Fall 1952 issue was also dated September 1952. There were seven volumes of three issues, and a final volume of two issues. The magazine was in pulp format and priced at 25 cents throughout its life; it began at 160 pages and dropped to 144 pages with the Spring 1951 issue, then to 128 pages with the September 1953 issue, and finally to 112 pages for the last two issues. The publisher was Best Books, of Kokomo, Indiana, which was owned by Standard Magazines of New York. The editor was initially Sam Merwin; Samuel Mines took over with the Winter 1952 issue, and the last two issues were edited by Alexander Samalman.

A Canadian edition of the first four editions appeared from Better Publications in Toronto with the same contents as the U.S. editions.

== Sources ==
- Ashley, Mike (1985). "Fantastic Story Quarterly". In Tymn, Marshall B.; Ashley, Mike (eds.). Science Fiction, Fantasy, and Weird Fiction Magazines. Westport, Connecticut: Greenwood Press. pp. 249–250. ISBN 0-313-21221-X.
- Ashley, Mike (2000). The Time Machines:The Story of the Science-Fiction Pulp Magazines from the beginning to 1950. Liverpool: Liverpool University Press. ISBN 0-85323-865-0.
- Ashley, Mike (2005). Transformations:The Story of the Science-Fiction Magazines from 1950 to 1970. Liverpool: Liverpool University Press. ISBN 0-85323-779-4.
