= Scientific Detective Monthly =

US pulp science fiction magazine

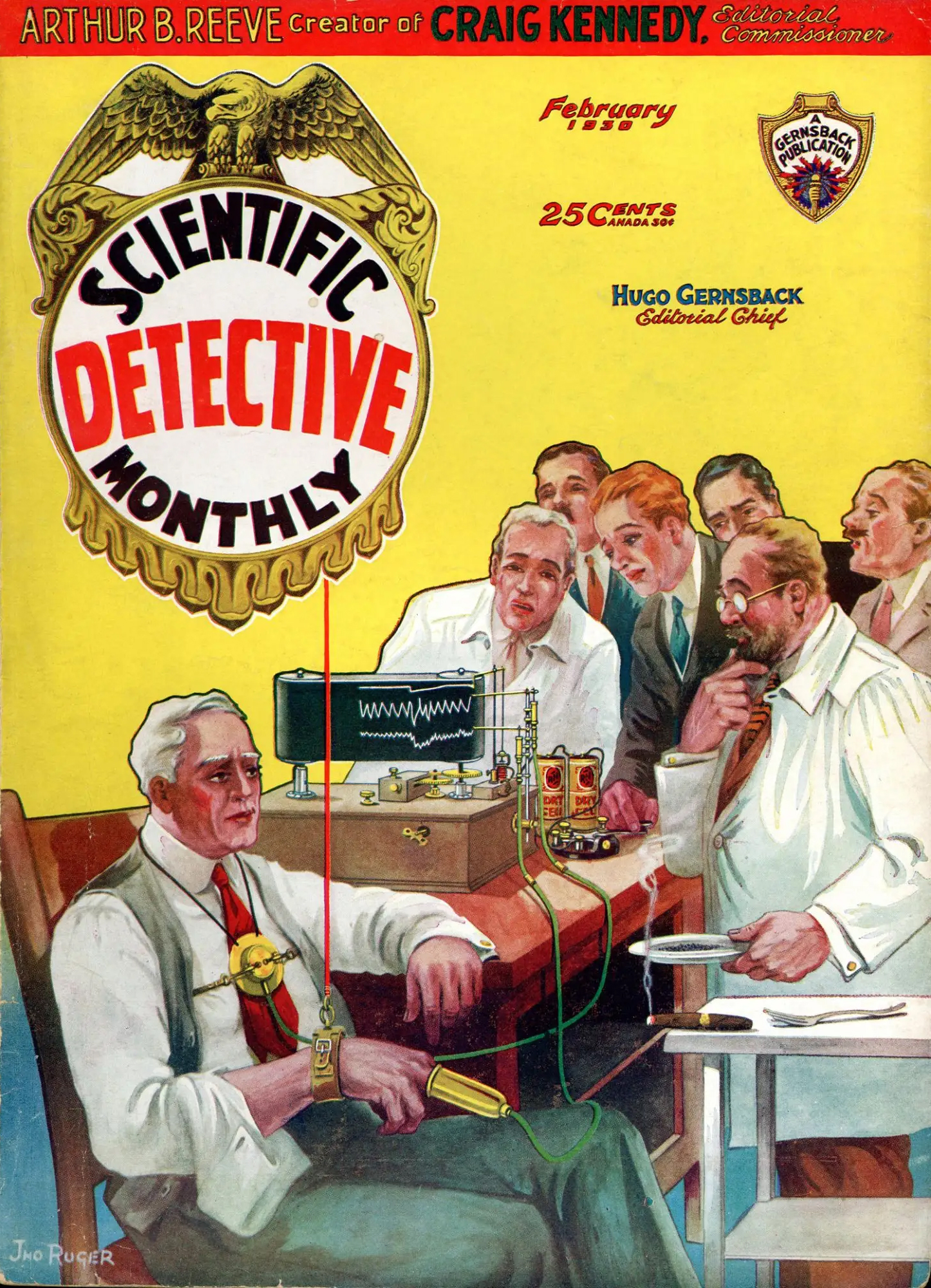
- Cover of the second issue; artwork by Jno Ruger
- Categories: Pulp magazine
- Publisher: Techni-Craft Publishing Company
- Founder: Hugo Gernsback
- Founded: January 1930
- Final issue: 1931
- Country: United States
- Based in: New York City
- Language: English

Scientific Detective Monthly (also known as Amazing Detective Tales and Amazing Detective Stories) was a pulp magazine that published fifteen issues beginning in January 1930. It was launched by Hugo Gernsback as part of his second venture into science-fiction magazine publishing, and was intended to focus on detective and mystery stories with a scientific element. Many of the stories involved contemporary science without any imaginative elements—for example, a story in the first issue turned on the use of a bolometer to detect a black girl blushing—but there were also one or two science fiction stories in every issue.

The title was changed to Amazing Detective Tales with the June 1930 issue, perhaps to avoid the word "scientific", which may have given readers the impression of "a sort of scientific periodical", in Gernsback's words, rather than a magazine intended to entertain. At the same time, the editor—Hector Grey—was replaced by David Lasser, who was already editing Gernsback's other science-fiction magazines. The title change apparently did not make the magazine a success, and Gernsback closed it down with the October issue. He sold the title to publisher Wallace Bamber, who produced at least five more issues in 1931 under the title Amazing Detective Stories.

== Publication history ==
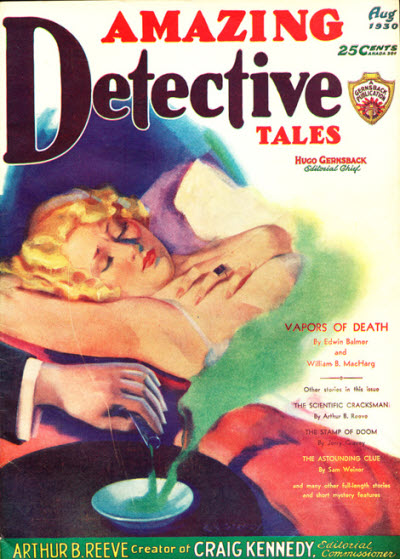
Cover of the August 1930 issue, under the new title Amazing Detective Tales, signed by Earle K. Bergey

By the end of the 19th century, stories that were centered on scientific inventions and set in the future, in the tradition of Jules Verne, were appearing regularly in popular fiction magazines. The first science fiction (sf) magazine, Amazing Stories, was launched in 1926 by Hugo Gernsback at the height of the pulp magazine era. It was successful, and helped to form science fiction as a separately marketed genre, but in February 1929 Gernsback lost control of the publisher when it went bankrupt. By April he had formed a new company, Gernsback Publications Incorporated, and created two subsidiaries: Techni-Craft Publishing Corporation and Stellar Publishing Corporation. In the middle of the year he launched three new magazines: a non-sf magazine titled Radio Craft, and two sf pulps titled Science Wonder Stories and Air Wonder Stories. These were followed in September 1929 by the first issue of Science Wonder Quarterly, and in October Gernsback sent a letter to some of the writers he had already bought material from, letting them know that he was seeing more demand for "detective or criminal mystery stories with a good scientific background". He named Arthur B. Reeve's "Craig Kennedy" stories as an example, and also mentioned S.S. Van Dine's "Philo Vance" stories, which were very popular at the time. In the January 1930 issue of both the sf magazines, Gernsback advertised the new magazine that he hoped to populate with these stories: Scientific Detective Monthly.

Gernsback believed that science fiction was educational, claiming, for example, that "teachers encourage the reading of this fiction because they know that it gives the pupil a fundamental knowledge of science and aviation". He intended Scientific Detective Monthly to be a detective magazine in which the stories had a scientific background; it would entertain, but also instruct. The subgenre of scientific detective fiction was not new; it had first become popular in the U.S. between 1909 and 1919, and the appearance of Gernsback's magazine was part of a resurgence of popularity in the subgenre at the end of the 1920s. The first issue was dated January 1930 (meaning it would have been on the newsstands in mid-December 1929). The publisher was Techni-Craft Publishing company based in New York City. Gernsback was editor-in-chief, and had final say on the choice of stories, but the editorial work was done by his deputy, Hector Grey.

In February 1930, an article by Gernsback appeared in Writers' Digest titled "How to Write 'Science' Stories". In it, Gernsback offered advice on how to write stories for his new magazine, claiming that scientific detective stories represented the future of the genre, and that "the ordinary gangster and detective story will be relegated into the background in a very few years". Science fiction historian Gary Westfahl comments that the article also serves as a guide to writing science fiction in general, and that the article is the first "how to" article published for the new genre of science fiction.

With the June issue, the title was changed to Amazing Detective Tales. Gernsback merged Science Wonder Stories and Air Wonder Stories into Wonder Stories at the same time; he was concerned that the word "Science" was putting off some potential readers, who assumed that the magazine was, in his words, "a sort of scientific periodical". It is likely that the same reasoning motivated Scientific Detective Monthly's new title. In the following issue, Grey was replaced as editor by David Lasser, who was already editing Gernsback's other sf titles, and an attempt was made to include more stories with science fiction elements. Gernsback continued the magazine for five issues under the new title; the last issue was dated October 1930. The decision to cease publication was apparently taken suddenly, as the October issue included the announcement that the format would change in November from large to standard pulp size, and listed two stories planned for the November issue. Gernsback sold the title to Wallace Bamber, who published at least five more issues, starting in February 1931; no issues are known for June or July 1931, or after August.

== Contents ==
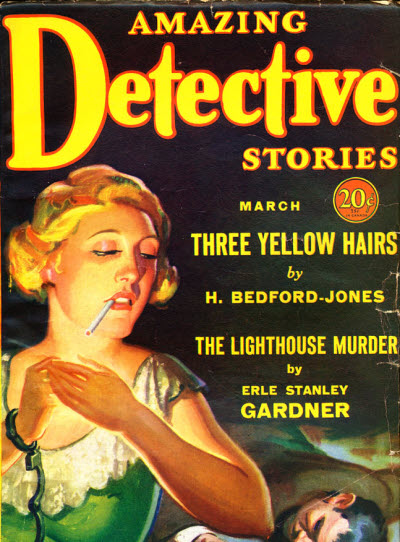
Cover of the March 1931 issue, now titled Amazing Detective Stories; the artist is likely Lyman Anderson

The stories in Scientific Detective Monthly were almost always detective stories, but they were only occasionally science fiction, as in many cases the science appearing in the stories already had practical applications. In the first issue, for example, "The Mystery of the Bulawayo Diamond", by Arthur B. Reeve, mentions unusual science, but the mystery is solved by the use of a bolometer to detect a blush on the face of a black woman. The murderer in "The Campus Murder Mystery", by Ralph W. Wilkins, freezes the body to conceal the manner of death; a chemical catalyst and electrical measurements of palm sweat provide the scientific elements in two other stories in the same issue. The only genuine science fiction story in the first issue is "The Perfect Counterfeit" by Captain S.P. Meek, in which a matter duplicator has been used to counterfeit paper money. Van Dine's Philo Vance novel, The Bishop Murder Case, began serialization in the first issue, which probably assisted sales, since the hardcover edition of the novel, which had appeared only a few months previously, had sold well. It was not science fiction, however, and throughout the magazine's run, only one or two stories per issue include elements that would qualify them as science fiction. Mike Ashley, a historian of the field, suggests that Gernsback was more interested in stories about the science of detection than in imaginary science: most of Scientific Detective Monthly's contents were gadget stories, of a kind which Gernsback had been publishing in his other magazines for some time. The cover for the first issue, by Jno Ruger, showed a detective using an electronic device to measure the reactions of a suspect.

Later issues included stories by some writers who either were already well known to readers of science fiction or would soon become so, including Lloyd Arthur Eshbach, David H. Keller, Ed Earl Repp, Neil R. Jones, and Edmond Hamilton, though even these stories were not always science fiction. Hamilton's "The Invisible Master", for example, describes a way to become invisible, but at the end of the story the science is revealed to be a hoax, and the story is straightforward detective fiction. Clark Ashton Smith, later to be better known for his fantasy than for science fiction, contributed "Murder in the Fourth Dimension" to the October 1930 issue; the protagonist uses the fourth dimension to dispose of his victim's corpse.

As well as fiction, there were some non-fiction departments, including readers' letters (even in the first issue—Gernsback obtained letters by advertising the magazine to readers who subscribed to his other magazines), book reviews, and miscellaneous crime or science-related fillers. The first issue included a test of the readers' powers of observation: it showed a crime scene, which the readers were supposed to study, and then posed questions to see how much they could remember of the details. There was also a questionnaire about science, which asked about scientific facts mentioned in the stories, and a "Science-Crime Notes" section containing news items about science and crime. Gernsback's editorial argued that science would eventually end crime, and suggested that both the police and criminals would make growing use of scientific innovations in the future. Gernsback included on the masthead the names of several experts on crime, such as Edwin Cooley, a professor of criminology at Fordham University; he also listed members of his staff on the masthead with made-up titles: C.P. Mason, a member of his editorial staff, was listed as "Scientific Criminologist", for example.

Following the sale, Bamber filled the magazine with ordinary detective fiction, including Edgar Wallace's The Feathered Serpent.

The first few covers of the magazine did not advertise the names of the authors whose work was inside, which was probably a mistake as existing science fiction readers might have been attracted by the names of writers with whom they were familiar. Conversely, the readers who might have been interested in the more sedate topics covered by the non-fiction were probably discouraged by the lurid cover artwork. Gernsback was unable to obtain enough fiction to make Scientific Detective Monthly a true mixture of the two genres, and the result was a magazine that failed to fully appeal to fans of either genre. It was, in historian Robert Lowndes' words, a "fascinating experiment", but a failed one.

== Bibliographic details ==
| | January | February | March | April | May | June | July | August | September | October | November | December |
|---|---|---|---|---|---|---|---|---|---|---|---|---|
| 1930 | 1/1 | 1/2 | 1/3 | 1/4 | 1/5 | 1/6 | 1/7 | 1/8 | 1/9 | 1/10 | | |
| 1931 | | 2/1 | 2/2 | 2/3 | 2/4 | | | 3/1 | | | | |
Issues of Scientific Detective Monthly, showing volume/issue number and color-coded to indicate the managing editor: Hector Grey (blue), David Lasser (yellow) and unknown (orange)

Scientific Detective Monthly was published by Techni-Craft Publishing Co. of New York for the first ten issues, and then by Fiction Publishers, Inc., also of New York. The editor-in-chief was Hugo Gernsback for the first ten issues; the managing editor was Hector Grey for the first six issues, and David Lasser for the next four. The editor for the 1931 issues is not known. The first volume contained ten numbers, the second contained four, and the last contained only one. The title changed to Amazing Detective Tales with the June 1930 issue, and again to Amazing Detective Stories in February 1931. The magazine was in large pulp format throughout; it was 96 pages long and priced at 25 cents.

== Sources ==
- Ashley, Mike (2000). The Time Machines: The Story of the Science-Fiction Pulp Magazines from the Beginning to 1950. Liverpool, England: Liverpool University Press. ISBN 0-85323-865-0.
- Ashley, Mike (2004). "The Gernsback Days". In Ashley, Mike; Lowndes, Robert A. W. (eds.). The Gernsback Days: A Study of the Evolution of Modern Science Fiction From 1911 to 1936. Holicong, Pennsylvania: Wildside Press. pp. 16–254. ISBN 0-8095-1055-3.
- Bleiler, Everett F. (1998). Science-Fiction: The Gernsback Years. Westport, Connecticut: Kent State University Press. ISBN 0-87338-604-3.
- Clareson, Thomas A. (1985). "Introduction". In Tymn, Marshall B.; Ashley, Mike (eds.). Science Fiction, Fantasy, and Weird Fiction Magazines. Westport, Connecticut: Greenwood Press. pp. xv–xxviii. ISBN 0-313-21221-X.
- Lowndes, Robert A. (1985). "Scientific Detective Monthly". In Tymn, Marshall B.; Ashley, Mike (eds.). Science Fiction, Fantasy, and Weird Fiction Magazines. Westport, Connecticut: Greenwood Press. pp. 556–562. ISBN 0-313-21221-X.
- Lowndes, Robert A. W. (2004). "Yesterday's World of Tomorrow". In Ashley, Mike; Lowndes, Robert A. W. (eds.). The Gernsback Days: A Study of the Evolution of Modern Science Fiction From 1911 to 1936. Holicong, Pennsylvania: Wildside Press. pp. 257–399. ISBN 0-8095-1055-3.
