= Harold F. Cruickshank =

Canadian writer (1893–1979)

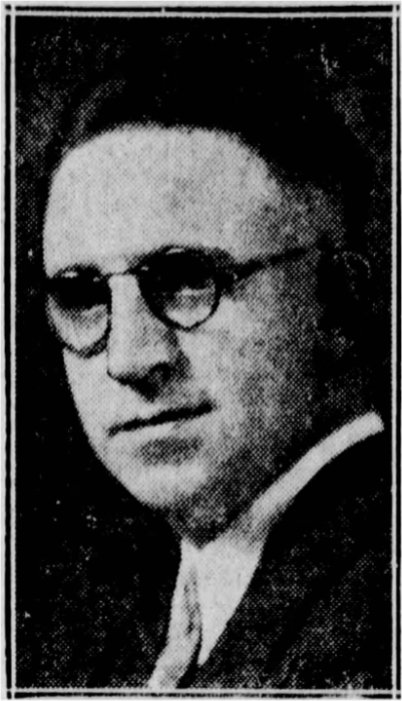
- Born: Harold Fraser Cruickshank; March 20, 1893; Mold, Flintshire, Wales
- Died: March 31, 1979 (aged 86); Edmonton, Alberta, Canada
- Occupation: Pulp-fiction author
- Known for: Great War fiction, aviation fiction, wilderness and animal stories

Canadian Harold F. Cruickshank was a World War I veteran, provincial civil servant, and from 1927–54 a prolific producer of fiction for American pulp magazines. He first specialized in Great War stories, including its subcategory, the war in the air. After those genres faded in popularity, he shifted to western and wilderness fiction, often featuring animals as his main characters.

== Background ==
Cruickshank was born in Mold, Wales, in 1893, the son of Scots, Duncan Cruickshank (1855–1941) and Flora Ellen MacLeod (1860–1936). He had three brothers and a sister.

Cruickshank cited his Welsh birth as an influence: “Perhaps this is the reason I took to the writing game. Wales is peopled by bards, poets and singers. I cannot sing, nor recite, so had to tackle one of the arts.”

In 1906, Duncan Cruickshank, Harold, and older brother Allan (1884–1960) emigrated to Canada. Other family members joined later. As Harold recalled, “We pushed right out to the frontier of an unsettled district, to take over pioneering duties.” In a tale Cruickshank repeated frequently: “The first morning of our arrival . . . my brother accidentally shot me with a .22, a half-inch below my left eye. Bullet became embedded in cheekbone. No medical attention.”

He called Alberta a “wonderland of ‘Great Open Spaces.’ ”

Hunted and trapped a lot, for our country teemed with wild-game life of every species: moose, bear, deer, lynx, wolf, coyote, beaver and fox, as well as all the lesser animal life of the hinterland. Engaged in various sideline occupations. Logging, railroading, and so forth. It was at my first railroad construction camp that I rubbed shoulders with many of the characters I now write about.

He also rubbed shoulders with a well-known Edmonton adventure author: “Have mushed the long white trails with none other than A. de Herries 'Doc' Smith in fifty below, where the wolves were wild and the snows deep.”

On July 14, 1915, Cruickshank married Dorothy May Watts (1896–1996). They had two children. John Duncan Cruickshank (1916–1945) died during World War II in Sweden while serving in the Royal Canadian Air Force. Edith Evelyn Nightingale (1921–2002) lived a long life in Edmonton.

== World War I ==
Cruickshank enlisted in the Canadian Army in July 1915; nearly four years later, on April 25, 1919, he was discharged at the rank of full sergeant. He saw action at the Battle of the Somme (1916), the Battle of Cambrai (1917), the Battle of Amiens (1918), and on other fronts. As he recalled:

My first war experience was to feel our lines quake and then rocket skyward at the eruption of a tremendous German mine dug in eighty feet beneath us! Had a miraculous escape on that occasion. A terrible night. Fired 175 rounds of ammunition and chucked countless hand grenades, all in the short space of less than two hours! We moved on the long trek to the Somme, where our guns were placed wheel to wheel. But I was wounded early of the first morning in.

In November 1917, Cruickshank was appointed Company Gas N.C.O. of his battalion. In February 1918, he was transferred from the infantry to the Canadian Corps Gas Services, where he instructed troops on defenses against gas attack. After the Armistice, he entered Germany with the Army of Occupation attached to the Chemical Adviser’s staff of the Corps H.Q.

The war is where Cruickshank’s writing career really began, as recounted for a 1929 interview:

One flaming night in Flanders, a wounded American doughboy crawled painfully to a small shell-hole far out in No Man’s Land. As the “Yank” slid down into the muddy refuge he noted that the hole already had one tenant; a young Canadian infantryman, also wounded.

The American growled a “Hello buddy!” then glanced curiously at the “Canuck”; for the latter seemed utterly oblivious to the presence of another person. By the light of the star-shells hovering overhead, the Canadian was busily engaged scribbling in a tattered note-book; muttering to himself all the while, and occasionally gazing straight ahead into vacancy.

Finally the Yank’s curiosity could stand the strain no longer.

“Hey Buddy! Whatcha doin’—makin’ out your will?” he asked.

Throwing down his pencil in fury, the Canuck glanced up.

“No you damn fool!” he replied; “I was writing a poem; but now you’ve spoiled my metre!”

. . . At any rate the poem was finished before the stretcher bearers found the two men, and Harold had the thrill of seeing his first bit of creative writing in print. It was published in The Listening Post, a small paper edited by the Canadian infantry unit.

== Pulp writer ==
In 1921, Cruickshank joined the provincial government civil service.

Beginning in 1922, his poems appeared intermittently in his hometown Edmonton Journal. The first known was “May” (May 2, 1922). The poems tended to feature wilderness or World War themes. The latter were occasionally timed to appear on or about Armistice Day, e.g., “Remembrance Day” (November 10, 1931). He was not paid for these contributions.

He sold his first major story to Western Home Monthly in 1923.

In 1926, Cruickshank enrolled with the Palmer Institute of Authorship, a correspondence course, to upgrade his storytelling skills. The institute, responding to the exploding growth in the magazine fiction markets, trained several students who subsequently had success in the American pulps. Cruickshank's first appearance in the Palmer student magazine came in the July 1926 issue, when he announced that he had sold a story, “The Will of the North” to a Canadian magazine.

Early in 1927, he was “overjoyed” when he sold a story to Dell Publishing for $75. Dell had launched a mania for Great War fiction with their pulp War Stories, first issue dated November 1926. Cruickshank’s first appearance in a Dell magazine was “War Wolves” (War Stories, August 19, 1927).

After three sales to Dell, Cruickshank sold a story to Dell’s leading rival in Great War fiction, Fawcett’s Battle Stories. Fawcett, paying higher rates, became his primary market, with Dell his secondary. He did so well with Battle that he occasionally had two stories in a single issue; in these cases, the second story appeared under the pseudonym Bert Fraser, built on his middle name.

In 1928, he quit his government job to devote full-time to writing.

In 1929–30, a Canadian publisher issued Canadian War Stories, intended to compete with the American war pulps and tell the Canadian side of the story. Cruickshank regularly contributed short stories. His numerous sales to Fawcett and Dell ran into the early 1930s. This corresponded with the waning of the Great War fad, at least for ground combat; air-war fiction remained popular.

When Henry Steeger was an associate editor for the Dell pulps, he became acquainted with Cruickshank’s work. In 1930, Steeger co-founded Popular Publications, which would prove to be one of the most successful pulp publishers. In June of that year, he asked Cruickshank to appear in the first issue of his first magazine, Battle Aces (October 1930). Cruickshank’s contribution, “The Lone Eagle,” actually appeared in the third issue (December). Notwithstanding, Popular soon became Cruickshank’s primary market. He appeared frequently in Popular’s air-war pulps, Battle Aces, Dare-Devil Aces, and Battle Birds, especially from 1932-35. In all three titles, he regaled the exploits of series characters: Bill Hennedy, the Sky Wolf (Battle Aces); Bill Dawe, the Sky Devil (Dare-Devil Aces); and Ted Blair, the Red Eagle (Battle Birds). Dawe was modeled after Cruickshank’s wartime infantry commander. To commemorate their friendship, Steeger and Cruickshank exchanged letters every June for the rest of their lives.

In 1933, Cruickshank made his first sale to the Thrilling pulp chain: “Jinx Peelot”, Sky Fighters, November 1933. Within a few years, his name appeared regularly in Popular and Thrilling pulps, in almost equal amounts.

Along the way, he sold the occasional western (or northwestern) story. His first was “Thundering Flames”, for Fiction House's North-West Stories, November 8, 1928. Westerns remained a minor part of his output until 1937. From that point forward, his output was primarily western and adventure with the occasional air story. He appeared frequently in Popular’s Ace-High Magazine and 10 Story Western Magazine; and later in Thrilling’s West and Range Riders Western.

In two April 1937 pulps, he introduced canine characters who would make a number of appearances. Keko, a “handsome silver-gray timber wolf”, was inspired by a wolf Cruickshank had seen in his early days in Canada, “one morning at sun-up . . . stretched to his full magnificent height on the slope of a nearby hill.” Keko stories appeared in 17 issues of Ace-High Magazine, and once in New Western Magazine. The other April 1937 debut was Olak, the White Phantom, an albino wolf, who appeared 15 times in Thrilling Adventures, West, Range Riders Western, and one final time in Columbia’s Famous Western.

== World War II ==
The Second World War interrupted Cruickshank’s writing career. Whereas he had averaged over 30 sales a year in the 1930s, he was published only 24 times from 1942–45, averaging six sales a year.

Meanwhile, in 1940, with the next war looming, Edmonton veterans organized the Veterans’ Volunteer Reserve, in two battalions, ostensibly to maintain vigilance against a potential fifth column. In 1942, Cruickshank became musketry officer for the North Edmonton Battalion. He gave lectures to his battalion and also published newspaper articles about the First World War to underscore vigilance for the Second. Presumably, these wartime activities detracted from his fiction production.

== Later years ==
Once the war ended, Cruickshank’s writing returned to prewar levels. The years of 1946–52 mark the last phase of his pulp career. He published 200 stories in this period, averaging 29 sales a year. His main markets remained Thrilling and Popular. The vast majority were westerns. He only published two more air stories, both for Sky Fighters in 1946.

His last published pulp story was “To the Death”, in 2-Gun Western (August 1954). By that time, the pulp market had shrunk to a handful of magazines.

In the end, he published 604 known pulp stories. Popular became his most productive market with 203 appearances, with Thrilling a close second at 190. He appeared in Fawcett and Dell pulps a combined 104 times. Fawcett’s Battle Stories and Popular’s Dare-Devil Aces were the magazines he most appeared in, at 49 apiece. Westerns proved his most productive genre, with 269 stories; air (158) and war (102) accounted for another 260 stories. His most prolific character was Bill Dawe, the Sky Devil, with 35 appearances, most of them in Dare-Devil Aces.

An anomaly in Cruickshank’s writing career is that he was a former athlete (track, soccer, baseball) and an avid sports fan, yet only published a dozen sports stories despite the opportunities presented by the many sports pulps.

After his pulp career ended, he continued writing. He regretted that the market for animal tales had dried up by 1962. In 1974, he wrote former Thrilling chief editor Leo Margulies that he was selling everything he wrote. Most of this material was for local historical or government publications.

In 1974, the Edmonton Journal published a profile of Cruickshank, declaring that “his personal story is every bit as interesting as evidently was some of his fiction.” The accompanying photo shows the beaming Cruickshank surrounded by the pulp magazines his tales had appeared in. The piece was widely reprinted in Canadian newspapers.

On March 31, 1979, Harold F. Cruickshank died in Misericordia Hospital, Edmonton, after several months of failing health.

== Works ==
=== Selected fiction ===
- “War Wolves”, War Stories, August 19, 1927 (first published pulp story)
- “A Kamerad for Shorty”, Battle Stories, December 1927 (first appearance in a Fawcett pulp)
- “The Gods of War”, Battle Stories, June 1928
- “Every Third Man a Pick”, Canadian War Stories, May 1929
- “In the Canadian Outfit”, Under Fire Magazine, June 1929
- “Riverfolk”, Boys' Life, September 1929
- “The Shell-Shocked Major”, Battle Stories, April 1930
- “Spy Hunter of the Somme”, Battle Stories, July 1930
- “The Lone Eagle”, Battle Aces, December 1930 (first appearance in a Popular pulp)
- “The Sky Wolf's Brood”, Battle Aces, January 1931 (first series character: Bill Hennedy, The Sky Wolf)
- “Jinx Peelot”, Sky Fighters, November 1933 (first appearance in a Thrilling pulp)
- “Château of Death”, George Bruce's Contact, December 1933
- “The Outlaw Patrol”, G-8 and His Battle Aces, June 1934
- “Ace of Blades”, Sport Story Magazine, February 1935
- “Hockey Heritage”, Sport Story Magazine, April 1935
- “The Vampire Flight”, Dare-Devil Aces, December 1935
- “Torture Dance”, Doc Savage Magazine, November 1936
- “White Phantom”, Thrilling Adventures, April 1937 (first appearance of Olak, the White Phantom)
- “Keko Steals a Mate”, Ace-High Magazine, April 1937 (first appearance of Keko)
- “Hockey Headman”, Thrilling Sports, March 1938
- “Horned Queen of the Jackpine Wastelands”, Big-Book Western Magazine, April 1948
- “To the Death”, 2-Gun Western, August 1954 (last published pulp story)

=== Selected journalism ===
- “Some Advice”, Writers' Markets & Methods, October 1933
- “Writing the Animal Story”, Writer's Digest, October 1944
- “Death Mist at Ypres Recalled”, Edmonton Journal, April 24, 1945
- “From Germ to Climax”, Writer's 1947 Year Book, February 1947
- “Why Have a Single Viewpoint”, Writer's Digest, March 1948

=== Reprints ===
- Sky Devil: Hell's Skipper. Age of Aces Books. 2008. ISBN 978-0979409264.
- Sky Devil: Ace of Devils. Age of Aces Books. 2017. ISBN 978-1937590062.

== Resources ==
- "Harold F. Cruickshank". Age of Aces. 2019.. Brief bio with a reprint of Cruickshank’s December 19, 1963 letter discussing his mentorship of air pulp author Robert J. Hogan.
- "Harold Fraser Cruickshank (1893–1979)". Age of Aces. February 26, 2021. Reprints obituary.
