= Solar Lottery =

1955 novel by Philip K. Dick

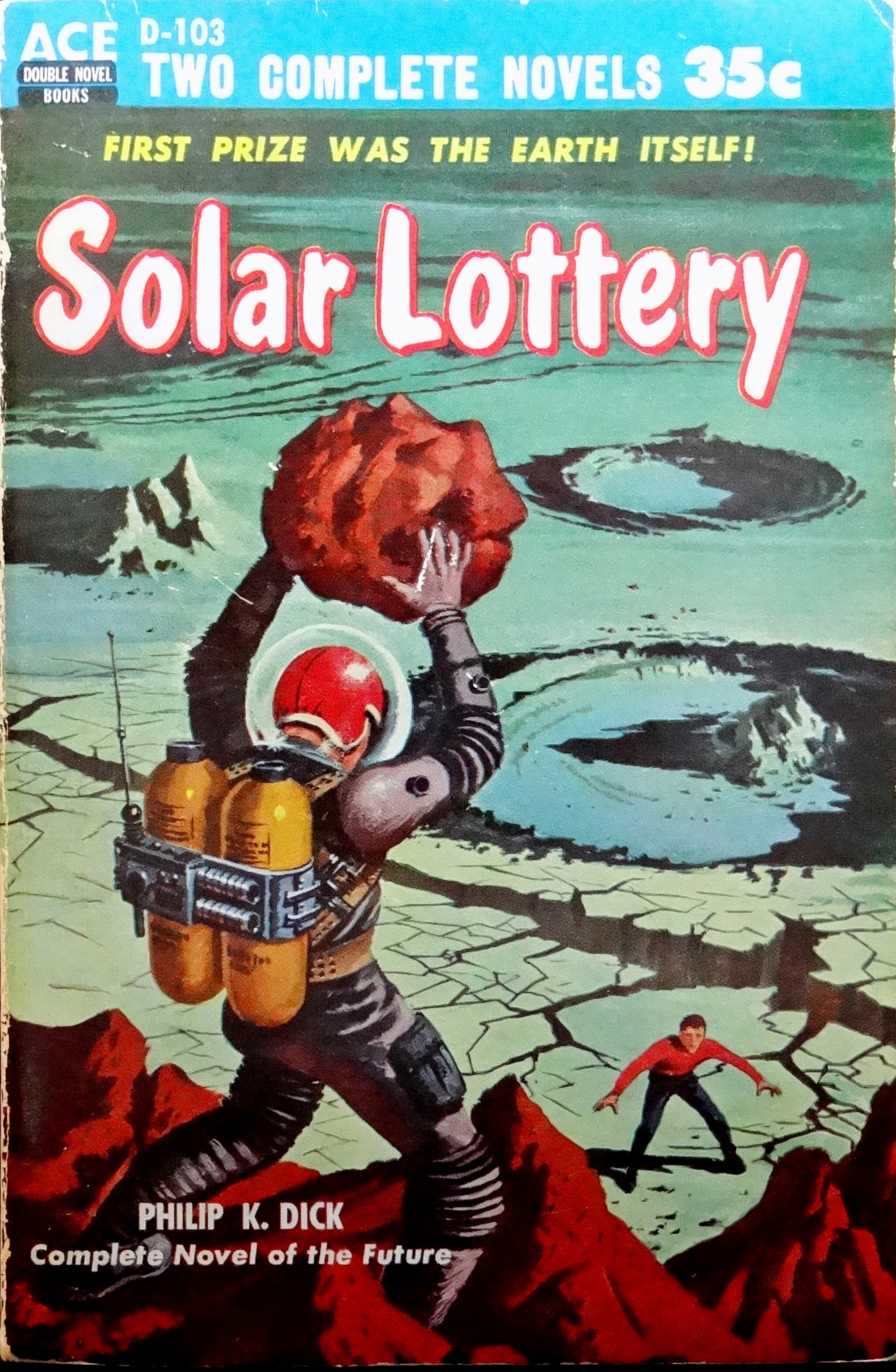
- Cover of first edition (paperback)
- Author: Philip K. Dick
- Cover artist: Ed Valigursky
- Genre: Science fiction
- Publisher: Ace Books
- Publication date: May 1955
- Publication place: United States
- Media type: Print (hardback and paperback)
- Pages: 188 pp

Solar Lottery is a 1955 science fiction novel by American writer Philip K. Dick. It was his first published novel and contains many of the themes present in his later work. It was also published in altered form in the UK as World of Chance. The main story is about a man named Ted Benteley who lives in a strange world, dominated by percentages and the lottery. Lotteries are used to choose the next leader as well as a new assassin, whose job is to try to kill the leader or "Quizmaster". Everybody in society has the opportunity to be selected as a leader or an assassin. Benteley unexpectedly gets chosen to be a member of the committee trying to assassinate the new Quizmaster and he must decide what he is going to do.

== Plot summary ==
Solar Lottery takes place in a world dominated by logic and numbers, and loosely based on a numerical military strategy employed by US and Soviet intelligence called minimax (part of game theory). The Quizmaster, head of the world government, is chosen through a sophisticated computerized lottery (sortition). This element of randomization serves as a form of social control since nobody – in theory at least – has any advantage over anybody else in their chances becoming the next Quizmaster.

Society is entertained by a televised selection process in which an assassin is also (allegedly) chosen at random. By countering and putting down threats to his life, using telepathic bodyguards, the leader gains the respect of the people. If he loses his life, a new Quizmaster, as well as another assassin, are again randomly selected. Quizmasters have held office for timespans ranging from a few minutes to several years. The average life expectancy is therefore on the order of a couple of weeks.

The novel tells the story of Ted Benteley, an idealistic young worker unhappy with his position in life. Benteley attempts to get a job in the prestigious office of Quizmaster Reese Verrick. Reese has just been forced out of office, however, and Benteley gets tricked into swearing an unbreakable oath of personal fealty to the former world leader. Verrick then makes it clear that his organization's mission is to assassinate the new Quizmaster, Leon Cartwright, in the world's most anticipated "competition".

To defeat the telepathic security web protecting Cartwright, Verrick and his team invent an android named Keith Pellig, into which different volunteers' minds are alternately embedded for the purpose of breaking any steady telepathic lock on the assassin. Cartwright ultimately kills Verrick, and Benteley, much to his own astonishment, becomes the next Quizmaster. Cartwright thereby reveals that he has managed to hack the lottery system and therefore controls who gets appointed Quizmaster next.

A second plotline concerns a team of Leon Cartwright's followers travelling to the far reaches of the Solar System in search of a mysterious cult figure named John Preston, who, 150 years after his disappearance, is thought to somehow be alive on the legendary tenth planet known as the "Flame Disc".

== Publishing history ==
Dick completed the first draft of Solar Lottery in March 1954. In December he completed a second draft at the request of Ace Books Editor Donald Wollheim, cutting six passages totalling as much as ten thousand words and adding perhaps seven thousand. In the meantime, however, the book had been sold to a publisher in the UK, where it appeared as World of Chance: this version includes the cut passages. However, the entire text of this version was severely copyedited, with wholesale eliminations of adjectives.

When Solar Lottery was first published in the United States by Ace Books, as one half of Ace Double D-103 in May 1955, it was bound dos-à-dos with The Big Jump by Leigh Brackett. The Ace Double edition ran 131 pages. Ace published a standard-format edition of the novel in 1959, running 188 pages. Its 1968 reissue, also running 188 pages, was labelled, misleadingly in view of the existence of the UK edition, "Complete & Unabridged".

== Reception ==
Reviewing the Ace Double, Anthony Boucher praised the novel as "built up with the detail of a Heinlein and the satire of a Kornbluth". Declaring that Dick had created "a strange and highly convincing and self-consistent future society," he faulted Solar Lottery only for "a tendency, in both its nicely contrasted plots, to dwindle away at the end".

Reviewing a 1977 reissue, Robert Silverberg noted that the novel's final revelation "looks forward to the cynicism of the radicalized Dick of the 1960s".

Philip K. Dick, interviewed while attending the French International SF Festival in Metz, France on September 1977, claimed that Solar Lottery was his best selling novel, selling at the time over three hundred thousand copies.

== Sources ==
- Disch, Thomas, "Towards the Transcendent: An Introduction to Solar Lottery and Other Works", Philip K. Dick, eds. Olander and Greenberg, New York: Taplinger, 1983, pp. 13–24.
- Gallo, Domenico. “La lotteria del sistema solare”, in Trasmigrazioni: I mondi di Philip K. Dick, a c. di V.M. De Angelis e U. Rossi. Firenze, Le Monnier, 2006, pp. 115–22.
