= Serge-Simon Held =

French writer

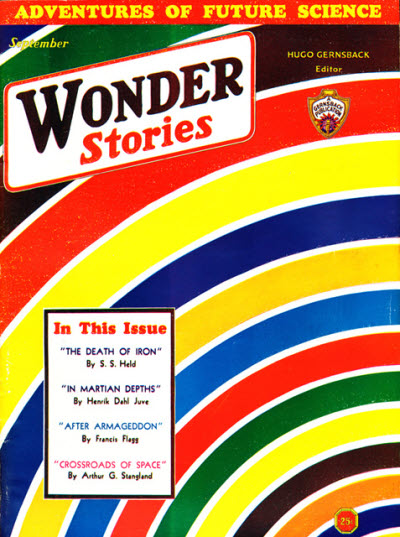
Held's The Death of Iron began English serialisation in the September 1932 issue of Wonder Stories.

Serge-Simon Held (credited as S.S. Held) was a French science fiction author known for the 1931 environmentalist novel La Mort du Fer (published in English as The Death of Iron). Very little is known about Held. He may have been from Alsace or of Alsacian descent, with many people from the region fleeing to Paris in 1870 due to the Alsacian cession to Germany following the Franco-Prussian War. The professor of English Frederick Waage was unable to find a record of Held, but noted that Held is frequently used as an ornamental surname among Jews.

La Mort du Fer was published by Fayard, and printed by Imprimerie Paillart of Abbeville, in 1931. The novel was serialized in the American science fiction pulp magazine Wonder Stories from September to December 1932. The translation was made by Fletcher Pratt, himself a noted science fiction author, and was later published in full in the 1952 edition of Wonder Story Annual. The novel is set in northern France, and concerns a mysterious "disease" which attacks iron. This eventually ushers in an "after-metal" world, in which plant life flourishes.

The French critic André Thérive wrote critically of La Mort du Fer in February 1932 in Le Temps. He claimed that "the book is very poorly put together: a very awkward alternation between private intrigues and 'historical' narratives, the poorly-paced sequence of the story, sometimes detailed, sometimes rushed, and especially an irritating composition which constantly retools the subject, rendering it ultimately schematic, expressed arbitrarily and cursorily". The later critic Juan Asensio, however, praised the novel's realism, characterising it as "remarkable", though "perfectly forgotten, even unknown".

The book was read by Ross Lockridge Jr., and was an inspiration for his unpublished epic poem The Dream of the Death of Iron and for the environmentalist themes of his novel Raintree County. La Mort du Fer has a "disquieting similarity in theme" to the English novelist David H. Keller's The Metal Doom, and the former may have served as an uncredited inspiration for the latter. Waage frames La Mort du Fer as "generational successor" to Germinal, by Émile Zola.
