= The Man Who Awoke =

1933 novel by Laurence Manning

- Cover of first edition
- Author: Laurence Manning
- Cover artist: Dean Ellis
- Language: English
- Genre: Science fiction
- Publisher: Ballantine Books
- Publication date: February 1975
- Publication place: United States
- Media type: Print (Paperback)
- Pages: 170 pp
- ISBN: 0-345-24367-6
- OCLC: 1442255

The Man Who Awoke is a 1933 science fiction novel by Canadian writer Laurence Manning. It was initially serialized in five parts during 1933 in Wonder Stories magazine. In 1975 it was published by Ballantine Books as one complete novel.

Norman Winters puts himself into suspended animation for 5,000 years at a time. The stories detail his ensuing adventures as he tries to make sense of the societies he encounters each time he wakes.

Isaac Asimov credited The Man Who Awoke for bringing the "energy crisis" to his attention 40 years before it became common knowledge in the 1970s.

== Plot summary ==
Part 1 of the series describes Norman Winters’ previous life and his process of suspended animation.

After the disappearance of Norman Winters, his son, Vincent, questions the servants working on his New York estate. After receiving a suspicious answer from the groundskeeper Carstairs, one of his father's most loyal workers, Vincent threatens to turn him in to the police. Preserving his freedom, Carstairs presents Vincent with a letter from his father detailing his whereabouts.

In the letter, Norman explains his collaborations with various scientists to determine how to build a chamber which will shield him from cosmic rays (Note: At the time the story was written, cosmic rays were hypothesized in several science fiction stories to induce the chemical changes in cells that are life.) and a coma-inducing drug. Norman constructs an underground chamber with six-foot leaden walls impervious to the outside radiation's influence on his cells. Once in the chamber, Norman will use the sleep-drug to fall into a coma where he “shall not awake until [he is] again subjected to radiation,” which will be provided by an X-ray lamp (similar to what one finds next to any dentist's chair) set to power on after five thousand years. In hopes of awaking to a Utopian future, Norman encourages Vincent to live his life in the absence of his father.

Upon waking up, Norman discovers that he had lain dormant for three thousand years. Realizing the success of his time travelling system, Norman explores the futuristic world briefly, and then returns to suspended animation, planning to wake again after another 5,000 years. He repeats this several times, giving the reader a brief view of various social results.

- 5000 AD. Humanity staggers to save itself amid the world's littered, stagnant wreckage after what has become known as the great Age of Waste. There is a political rivalry between the younger generation opposing the older generation's proposed waste of resources that they (the younger generation) assert that they are entitled to.
- 10,000 AD. The world is dominated by the Brain – the immovable in purpose super computer that knows all, sees all, and feels nothing. Thanks to its cradle-to-grave supervision, human life is easy and comfortable, but what will happen when The Brain realizes people are superfluous?
- 15,000 AD. People can now program their choice of dreams and sleep their lives away. Winters awakes to find the sleeping outnumber the living. He cannot stop the implosion of civilization by himself.
- 20,000 AD. After an abused Age of Freedom came an Age of License. Genetic experiment heralded the terrifying Age of Anarchy. Each Individual had his own mobile "City" that provided for all his needs, resulting in a society where people had no need for each other and were incapable of cooperating, resulting in nearly all interpersonal encounters being small wars.
- 25,000 AD. Scientists discover the secret sought through the centuries – immortality. But is Mankind ready for it? Immortality is frightfully boring without a purpose. Humanity scatters to the far corners of the cosmos seeking knowledge and experience, leading to a quest toward "the meaning of it all."

The novel might be easily dismissed as standard pulp fare if it had not presaged concepts popularized decades later: the sexual revolution, green consumerism, strong AI, full-immersion virtual reality as a surgical procedure (like The Matrix), desktop molecular manufacturing, global warming, and stem cell therapies. Many of these have only appeared in most peoples' worldview in the 21st century.
