= Earle K. Bergey =

American illustrator

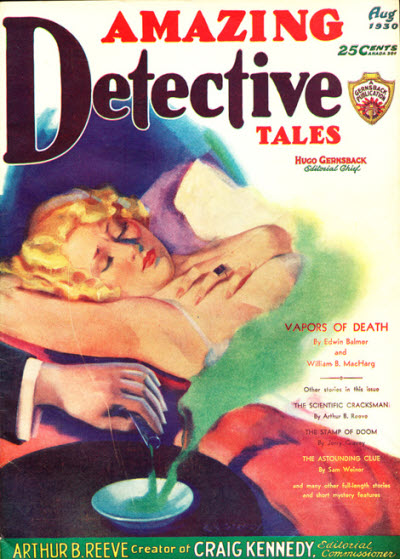
August 1930 cover of the pulp magazine, Amazing Detective Tales, signed by Earle K. Bergey. A landmark image from the early stages of Bergey's career, this is the only cover the artist produced for a Hugo Gernsback publication.

Earle K. Bergey (August 26, 1901 – September 30, 1952) was an American artist and illustrator who painted cover art for thousands of pulp fiction magazines and paperback books. One of the most prolific pulp fiction artists of the 20th century, Bergey is recognized for creating, at the height of his career in 1948, the iconic cover of Anita Loos's Gentlemen Prefer Blondes (1925) for Popular Library.

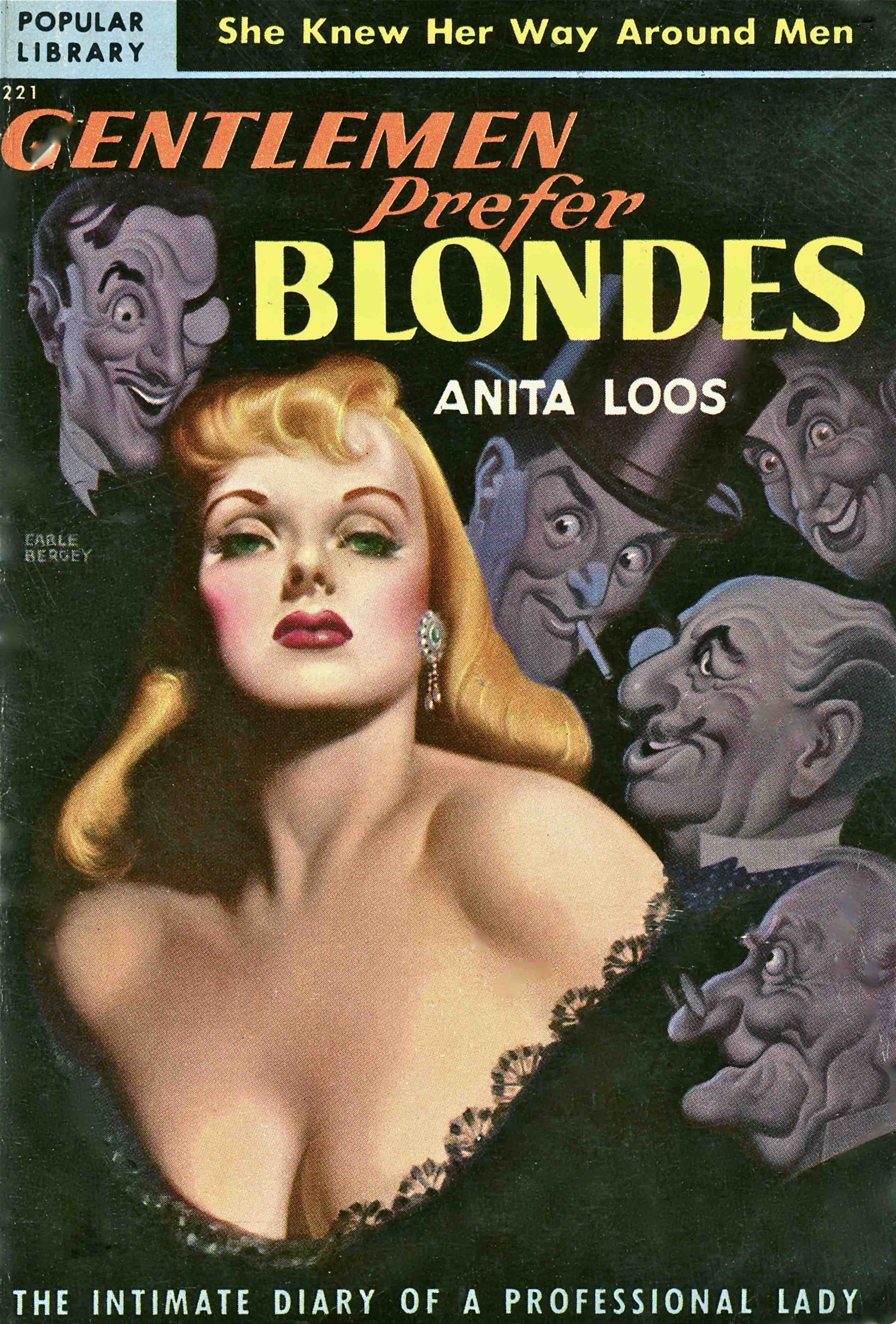
Marking the start of Bergey's highly influential run as an American paperback illustrator, this bombshell painting made the mass paperback cover of Anita Loos's blockbuster, Gentlemen Prefer Blondes (published as Popular Library #221).

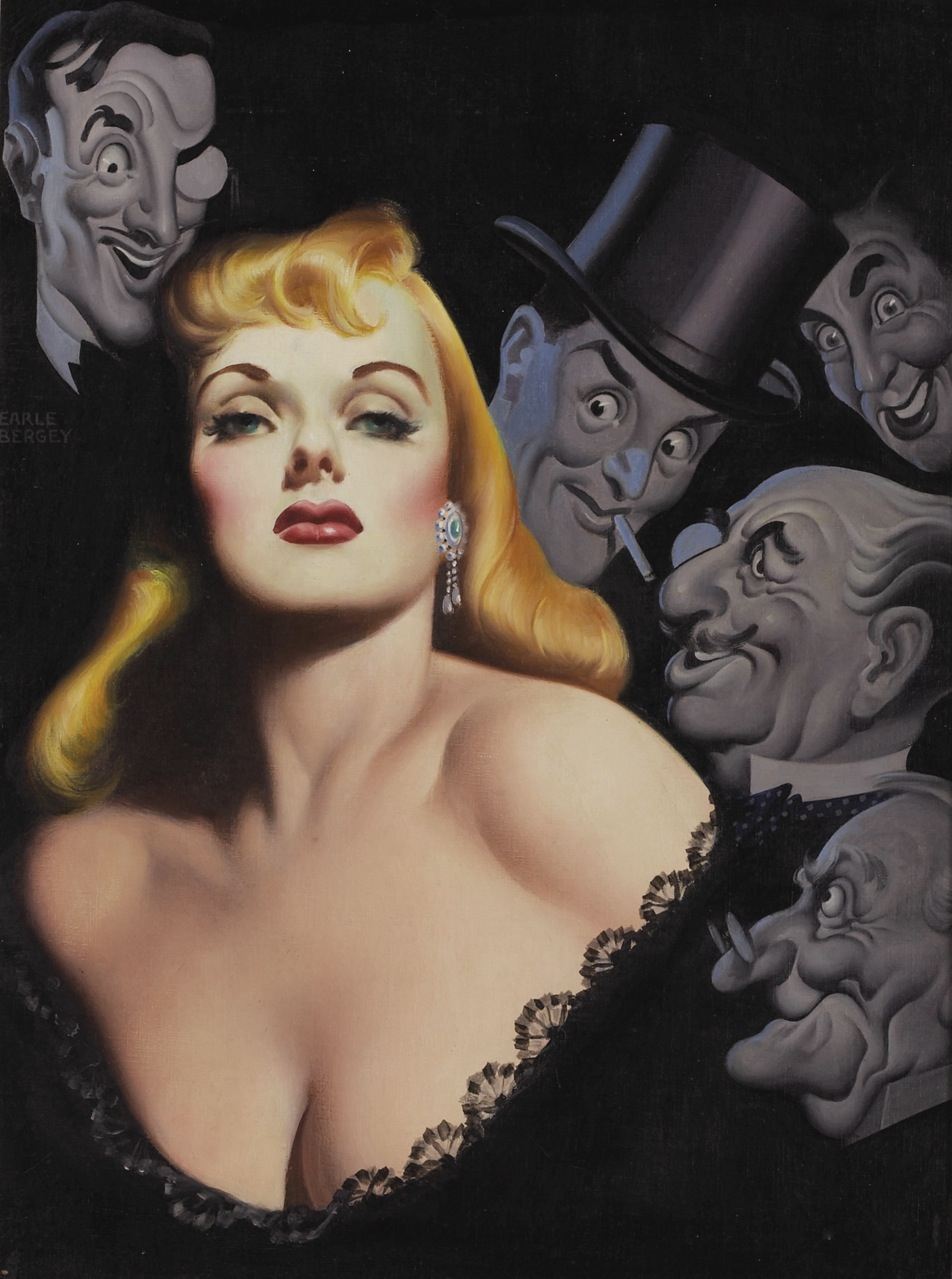
Earle K. Bergey's cover painting for Gentlemen Prefer Blondes, circa 1948.

Bergey was born in Philadelphia, Pennsylvania to A. Frank and Ella Kulp Bergey. He attended Pennsylvania Academy of the Fine Arts from 1921 to 1926. He initially went to work in the art departments of Philadelphia newspapers including Public Ledger, and he drew the comic strip Deb Days in 1927 for the Public Ledger Syndicate. Early in his career, Bergey contributed many covers to the pulp magazines of publisher Fiction House. By the mid-1930s, Bergey made a home and studio in Bucks County, Pennsylvania, and he married in 1935. In the late 1940s, he also started to sell cover illustrations to the rapidly expanding paperback book industry. Bergey died suddenly and unexpectedly on September 30, 1952 in New Hope, Pennsylvania with family at his side. Cause of death according to his death certificate was acute coronary thrombosis due to coronary artery disease.

== Pulp magazines ==
Throughout the 1930s, Bergey worked freelance for a number of publishing houses. His eye-catching paintings were predominantly featured as covers on a wide array of pulp magazines, including romance (Thrilling Love, Popular Love, Love Romances) as well as detective, adventure, aviation, and Westerns. Bergey also illustrated mainstream publications during this time, such as The Saturday Evening Post, and produced cover art for fitness magazines. Along with pin-up painting peers such as Enoch Bolles and H. J. Ward, Bergey was one of the first prominent American pin-up artists, contributing hundreds of covers to influential magazines including Gay Book Magazine, Pep Stories, and Snappy.

During the 1940s, Bergey continued to paint covers for romance, sports, and detective pulp magazines, and he began working on a number of science fiction magazines, including Standard Magazines's Strange Stories, Startling Stories, and Captain Future, and later for Fantastic Story Magazine. Bergey's fine art training and salient gift for depicting anatomy made him a go-to artist across a diversity of genres that required scenes with dramatic movement, from photo-realistic sports portraits of famous athletes including Mickey Cochrane, Lou Gehrig, and Jim Thorpe to his signature Bergey Girls that appeared on risque pulps throughout the Depression and in science fiction scenarios from World War II.

Bergey's science fiction covers, sometimes described as "Bim, BEM, Bum," usually featured a woman being menaced by a Bug-Eyed Monster, alien, or robot, with an heroic male astronaut coming to her assistance. The bikini-tops he painted often resembled coppery metal, giving rise to the phrase "the girl in the brass bra," used in reference to this sort of art. Visionaries in TV and film have been influenced by Bergey's work. Gene Roddenberry, for example, provided his production designer for Star Trek with examples of Bergey's futuristic pulp covers. The artist's illustrations of scantily-clad women surviving in outer space served as an inspiration for Princess Leia's slave-girl outfit in Return of the Jedi, and Madonna's conical brass brassiere.

== Paperbacks ==
In 1948, Bergey made the transition to the rapidly expanding paperback book industry along with skilled pulp artists like Rudolph Belarski, whose work is often confused with Bergey's. While continuing to paint pulp covers until his death, Bergey sold illustrations to at least four leading paperback publishing houses, including Popular Library and Pocket Books. His art graced the covers of dozens of novels and helped to sell millions of volumes. His paperback cover illustrations were as diverse as his work for the pulps. In addition to his work on the 1948 Popular Library edition of Anita Loos's Gentlemen Prefer Blondes, Bergey painted cover art for well-known authors from Émile Zola to the Western master, Zane Grey, whose 1951 Pocket Books edition cover painting for The Spirit of the Border is a Bergey classic. Many of his paperbacks are now cult classics, some featuring hidden self-portraits.

== See also ==
- Good girl art
- List of pinup artists
- Paperback
- Pin-up girl
- Princess Leia's metal bikini
- Thrilling Publications
