= Strange Stories (magazine) =

US pulp fantasy magazine (1939–1941)

Cover of the August 1939 issue, painted by Earle K. Bergey.

Strange Stories was a pulp magazine which ran for thirteen issues from 1939 to 1941. It was edited by Mort Weisinger, who was not credited. Contributors included Robert Bloch, Eric Frank Russell, C. L. Moore, August Derleth, and Henry Kuttner. Strange Stories was a competitor to the established leader in weird fiction, Weird Tales. With the launch, also in 1939, of the well-received Unknown, Strange Stories was unable to compete. It ceased publication in 1941 when Weisinger left to edit Superman comic books.

== Publication history and contents ==
Fantasy and occult fiction had often appeared in popular magazines before the twentieth century, but the first American magazine to specialize in the genre, Weird Tales, appeared in 1923 and by the 1930s was the genre's industry leader. In 1939, two magazines were launched in the same niche: one was Unknown, from Street & Smith; the other was Strange Stories, published by Standard Magazines and edited by Mort Weisinger, who was already editing Thrilling Wonder Stories and Startling Stories for Standard. The budget for fiction was half a cent per word, which was a low rate compared to other magazines. Weisinger obtained stories from many authors who contributed to Weird Tales, including August Derleth, Henry Kuttner, and Robert Bloch, who between them accounted for 40 of the 148 stories the magazine printed over its thirteen issues. Critics consider little of the fiction memorable. Among the better-received stories were two by Kuttner: "Cursed be the City" and "The Citadel of Darkness" in the April and August 1939 issues respectively; "Logoda's Heads", by Derleth, which science fiction historian Robert Weinberg described as "perhaps Derleth's best weird fantasy for any magazine"; and some stories by Manly Wade Wellman in the early issues. Other contributors included Eric Frank Russell, C. L. Moore, and Seabury Quinn. There were no serialized novels; at the time, Standard's policy forbade them. Weinberg described the covers by Standard's in-house artists, Rudolph Belarski and Earle K. Bergey, as "among the worst ever seen on any pulp". The magazine was an attempt to imitate Weird Tales, but Weisinger was never able to give it any distinctive character of its own. It received little assistance from its sister magazines in Standard's publishing stable; typically each magazine carried advertisements for other Standard publications, but Startling Stories and Thrilling Wonder Stories rarely mentioned Strange Stories in this way.

Weisinger left Standard Magazines in 1941 to edit Superman comics, and Leo Margulies, the editorial director at Standard, was not interested in continuing the magazine. The final issue was dated February 1941. Some of the stories purchased for Strange Stories but left unpublished later appeared in the other Standard magazines, including "The Road to Yesterday", by Kuttner, which appeared in the August 1941 issue of Thrilling Adventures, and "I Married a Ghost", by Seabury Quinn, which was published in Thrilling Mystery in July 1941.

== Bibliographic details ==
Issues of Strange Stories
	Jan	Feb	Mar	Apr	May	Jun	July	Aug	Sep	Oct	Nov	Dec
1939		1/1		1/2		1/3		2/1		2/2		2/3
1940		3/1		3/2		3/3		4/1		4/2		4/3
1941		5/1										
Issues of Strange Stories, showing volume/issue number. Mort Weisinger was the editor throughout.

The thirteen issues of Strange Stories were in pulp format. They were 128 pages long and priced at 15 cents until June 1940, after which the page count went down to 96 and the price was reduced to 10 cents. The editor was Mort Weisinger, who was not credited. The publisher was Better Publications, a subsidiary of Standard Magazines of New York. Strange Stories stayed on a bimonthly schedule throughout its run. There were three issues to a volume, except the final volume which had only one.

== Sources ==
- Ashley, Mike (1997). "Strange Stories". In Clute, John; Grant, John (eds.). The Encyclopedia of Fantasy. New York: St. Martin's Press, Inc. pp. 901–902. ISBN 0-312-15897-1.
- Ashley, Mike (2000). The Time Machines:The Story of the Science-Fiction Pulp Magazines from the beginning to 1950. Liverpool: Liverpool University Press. ISBN 0-85323-865-0.
- Moskowitz, Sam (1974) [1966]. Seekers of Tomorrow. Westport, Connecticut: Hyperion. ISBN 0-88355-158-6.
- Weinberg, Robert (1985a). "Strange Stories". In Tymn, Marshall B.; Ashley, Mike (eds.). Science Fiction, Fantasy, and Weird Fiction Magazines. Westport, Connecticut: Greenwood Press. pp. 623–625. ISBN 0-313-21221-X.
- Weinberg, Robert (1985b). "Strange Tales". In Tymn, Marshall B.; Ashley, Mike (eds.). Science Fiction, Fantasy, and Weird Fiction Magazines. Westport, Connecticut: Greenwood Press. pp. 626–628. ISBN 0-313-21221-X.
- Weinberg, Robert (2011). "The Strange Stories That Never Was". Pulp Vault (14). Barrington Hills IL: Tattered Pages Press.
- Williamson, Jack (1984). Wonder's Child. Bluejay Books. ISBN 0-312-94456-X.
