= Laurence Manning =

Canadian science fiction author

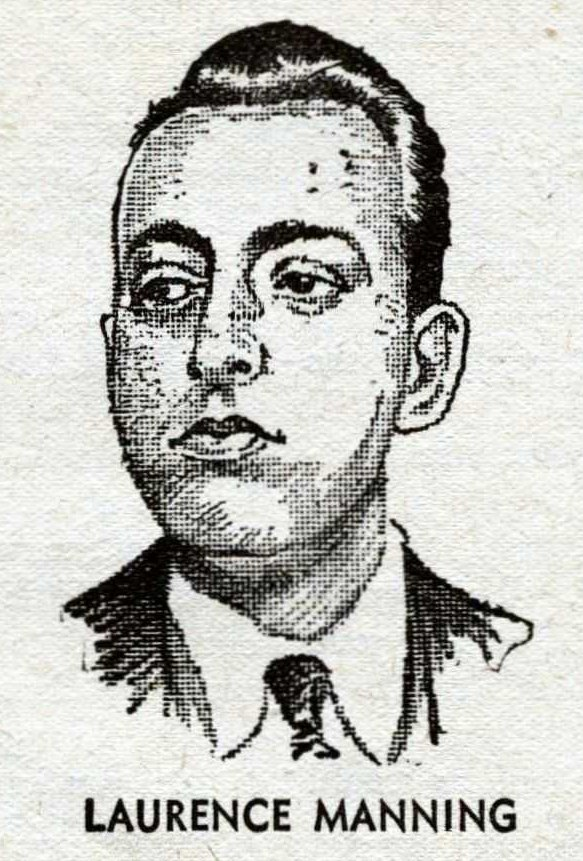
Laurence Manning c.1932

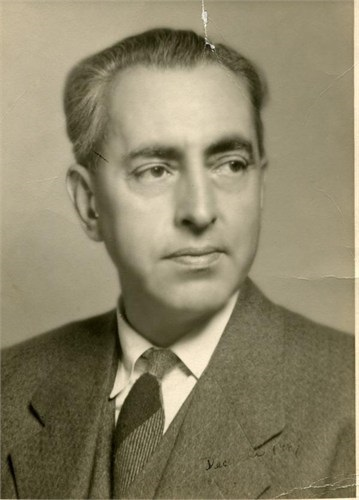
Laurence Manning, December, 1951

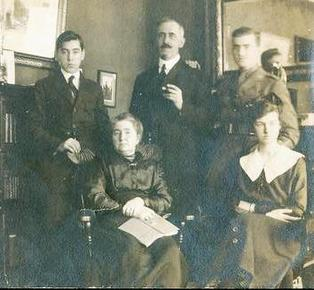
Top (l-r): Laurence, age 17; father Dr. James W.; brother Frederick Charles. Bottom (l-r): mother Helen G.A. Hanington; sister Helen Marjorie.

Laurence Manning (July 20, 1899 – April 10, 1972) was a Canadian science fiction author.

== Early life ==
Manning was born in Saint John, New Brunswick, and attended Kings College in Halifax, Nova Scotia. As did his two older brothers, Manning signed up to participate in WWI, but he was too young – when the War ended, he was still in training, and never saw action overseas. He signed his attestation papers for the RFC on May 14, 1918. Manning lost his two older brothers at very early ages: the oldest Frederick Charles died of wounds suffered fighting for the 85th Battalion, C.E.F in the battle of Vimy Ridge, France, on April 9, 1917; James Harold suffered wounds in the same battle but survived the war. He died working as an engineer for the Standard Oil Company in Maturin, Venezuela, in October 1924 at age 27.

== Writing career ==
In the 1920s, Manning moved to the United States, living initially with his great uncle, Craven Langstroth Betts, the noted Canadian poet. In the US, he lived in Manhattan before moving to Staten Island in 1928, where he began writing short stories for several pulp science fiction magazines. After teaming with SF writer Fletcher Pratt in "City of the Living Dead" in the May 1930 issue of Science Wonder Stories, he wrote "The Voyage of the 'Asteroid'", which appeared in the Summer 1932 issue of Wonder Stories Quarterly, and The Man Who Awoke, a series of stories that was later published as a novel. He also translated at least one German-language story for Hugo Gernsback's magazines (this may have been the translation of his popular story "The Man Who Awoke," published as Der Jahrtausendschläfer (The Millennium Sleeper). However, In the July, August, and September 1932 issues of Wonder Stories appeared "In the Year 8000", by Otfrid von Hanstein, translated by Manning, teamed with Konrad Schmidt.

It is possible the loss of these brothers and the horrors of war the country had just endured caused Laurence to become interested in the idea of Utopia. In the early 1930s he had over 500 books in his collection on the subject. It was in hopes of obtaining more book titles on Utopia that Manning contacted Wonder Stories magazine. He hoped to talk with Hugo Gernsback, but instead got David Lasser. They formed a strong friendship that lasted until Manning's death in 1972. They ate lunch together frequently, and it was at one of them that Manning mentioned having an idea for a story. After some discussion, Lasser suggested that Manning contact Fletcher Pratt, who could help with the story. This resulted in Manning's first published science fiction work, co-written by Pratt, entitled City of the Living Dead, which appeared in the May 1930 Science Wonder Stories.

Manning gave up his successful writing career at the end of 1935 (with the exceptions of "Coal Thief" in the April 1936 The Planeteer and "Expedition to Pluto" in the winter 1939 Planet Stories), and devoted his time to Kelsey mail order nursery business he owned and managed. Apart from several short stories in the 1950s (Good-Bye, Ilha!, Mr. Mottle Goes Pouf, Men on Mars), he never wrote any more science fiction. However, he was the author of a successful book on gardening, The How and Why of Better Gardening (1951), Van Nostrand & Co, used for more than 40 years as a textbook by the Garden Clubs of America.

== Rocketry ==
He was a founding member of the American Interplanetary Society, serving as both president and editor of the Society's publication, Astronautics. For his involvement in the Society, Manning is recognized by the Smithsonian's National Air and Space Museum as an early rocketry pioneer. It was during his tenure as president of the society that the organization's name was changed to the American Rocket Society. Manning retired from the Society in the mid-1940s, stating that rocketry had 'grown up', and was no longer a place for amateurs. In 1960, Manning was awarded a fellowship in the Society, presumably given at the Society's annual meeting.

== Personal life and death ==
Manning married Edith Mary Finette Burrows in 1928 and had three children: Helen Louise, Dorothy, and James Edward. His daughter Dorothy has mentioned that Laurence was not only a skilled writer, but a pianist as well. He composed his own pieces, primarily as music director of his church, though only one, Peter Pan, was ever published. He also smoked pipe. He lived in Highlands, New Jersey, from 1951 until his death in 1972.

== Works ==
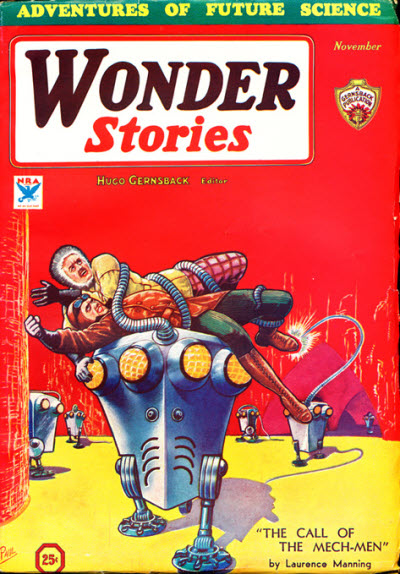
Manning's "The Call of the Mech-Men " was the cover story for the November 1933 issue of Wonder Stories

- Native Flowering Evergreens (American Forests and Forest Life, July 1925)
- Fuzzy (American Forests and Forest Life, October 1925)
- Elaiah, an Easter Story of the Trees (American Forests and Forest Life, April 1927)
- Several articles in Better Homes and Gardens (Need Volume/Issue Numbers)
- City of the Living Dead co-authored with Fletcher Pratt (May 1930 Science Wonder Stories), reprinted by Gernsback Publications in 1939
- The Voyage of the Asteroid (Summer 1932 Wonder Stories Quarterly)
- In The Year 8000 (by Otfrid von Hanstein, translated by Laurence Manning and Konrad Schmidt)(Jul, Aug, Sep 1932 Wonder Stories)
- Wreck of the Asteroid, Part One (Dec 1932 Wonder Stories)
- Wreck of the Asteroid, Part Two (January 1933 Wonder Stories)
- Wreck of the Asteroid, Part Three (February 1934 Wonder Stories)
- The Man Who Awoke, Part 1 (March 1933 Wonder Stories)
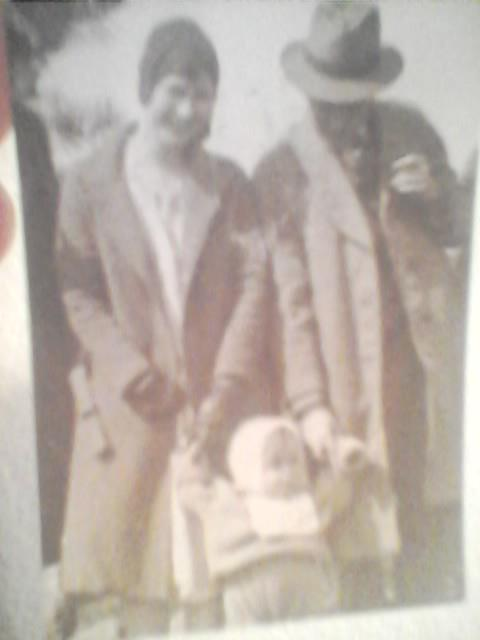
- Manning with wife Edith Mary Finette Burrows and daughter Helen Louise, ca. winter, 1930.
  The Man Who Awoke, Part 2 (April 1933 Wonder Stories)
- The Man Who Awoke, Part 3 (May 1933 Wonder Stories)
- The Man Who Awoke, Part 4 (June 1933 Wonder Stories)
- The Man Who Awoke, Part 5 (August 1933 Wonder Stories)
- The Call of the Mech Men (November 1933 Wonder Stories)
- Caverns of Horror (March 1934 Wonder Stories)
- Voice of Atlantis (July 1934 Wonder Stories)
- Interview with Laurence Manning (July 1934 Fantasy Magazine)
- The Living Galaxy (September 1934 Wonder Stories)
- The Moth Message (December 1934 Wonder Stories)
- The Prophetic Voice (April 1935 Wonder Stories)
- Seeds From Space (June 1935 Wonder Stories)
- World of the Mist, Part 1 (September 1935 Wonder Stories)
- World of the Mist, Part 2 (October 1935 Wonder Stories)
- Coal Thief (April 1936 The Planeteer)
- Expedition to Pluto (Winter 1939 Planet Stories (With Fletcher Pratt))
