= Captain Hazzard =

American pulp science fiction magazine

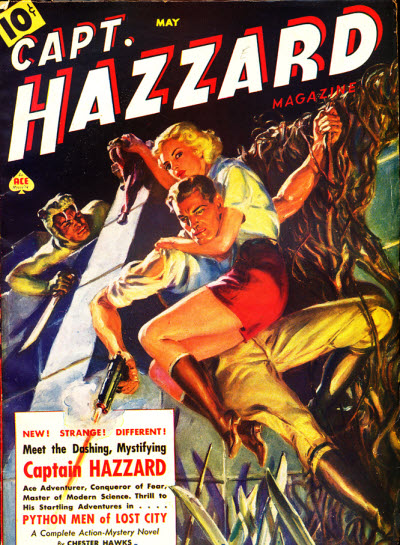
Cover of the only issue, by Norman Saunders

Captain Hazzard was a science fiction pulp magazine which published one issue in 1938. It was published by Aaron Wyn's Ace Magazines, and edited by Aaron's wife, Rose Wyn. The lead novel, "Python-Men of the Lost City", featured Captain Hazzard, a telepathic superhero; the author's name, "Chester Hawks", was a pseudonym. The magazine also contained some shorter fiction. The lead novel was reprinted in 1974 by Robert Weinberg.

The magazine was an attempt to copy the success of other hero pulps such as Doc Savage, but science fiction historian Mike Ashley suggests that "although a few more superhero pulps would appear, their future was increasingly in the comic-book field".

== Bibliographic details ==
The publisher was Ace Magazines of New York; the only issue was dated May 1938. The editor was Rose Wyn; the magazine was in pulp format, 96 pages, and priced at 10 cents.

== Sources ==
- Ashley, Mike (2000). The Time Machines: The Story of the Science-Fiction Pulp Magazines from the beginning to 1950. Liverpool: Liverpool University Press. ISBN 0-85323-865-0.
- Weinberg, Robert (1985). "Captain Hazzard". In Tymn, Marshall B.; Ashley, Mike (eds.). Science Fiction, Fantasy and Weird Fiction Magazines. Westport, Connecticut: Greenwood Press. p. 158. ISBN 0-3132-1221-X.
- Walton, Michael (2019). The Horror Comic Never Dies: A Grisly History. Jefferson, North Carolina: McFarland & Company, Inc. ISBN 978-1-4766-7536-7.
