= Thrilling Publications =

Pulp magazine publisher

- Industry: Magazine publication
- Founded: 1928
- Founder: Ned Pines
- Defunct: 1961
- Headquarters: United States
- Products: Magazines, pulp magazines
- Services: Publishing
- Parent: Standard Comics

Thrilling Publications, also known as Beacon Magazines (1936–37), Better Publications (1937–43) and Standard Magazines (1943–55), was a pulp magazine publisher run by Ned Pines, publishing such titles as Startling Stories and Thrilling Wonder Stories.

Pines became the president of Pines Publications in 1928. Pines folded most of his magazines in 1955 but continued to lead the company until 1961.

== Cover artists ==
Pines' cover artists included Earle K. Bergey, John Parker, George Rozen, and Rudolph Belarski.

== Paperbacks ==
In 1942 Pines started Popular Library, a paperback publishing house, and devoted himself to that company after closing his other ventures. Popular reprinted materials from the pulps.

== Characters ==
- Bill Dawe (The Sky Devil) (by Harold F. Cruickshank)
- The Black Bat
- Captain Danger
- Captain Future (a separate comic book character, unrelated to the pulp character, also existed)
- Crimson Mask
- Green Ghost (also appeared in comics)
- Masked Detective
- Masked Rider (purchased from Martin Goodman's Ranger Publications after the first three issues; Better Publications' numbering started with v01n01)
- Olak, the White Phantom (by Harold F. Cruickshank)
- The Phantom Detective
- The Purple Scar
- The Rio Kid

== Titles ==
- Air War
- Army Navy Flying Stories
- Black Book Detective
- Captain Future (1940–1944; 17 issues)(the series was continued with several novels and short stories in Startling Stories)
- Detective Book Magazine
- Detective Novels
- Everyday Astrology
- Exciting Detective
- Exciting Love
- Exciting Football
- Exciting Western
- Fantastic Story Quarterly / Fantastic Story Magazine (1950-1955, 23 issues)
- G-Men
- The Lone Eagle
- Masked Detective (1940–1943, 12 issues)
- Masked Rider Western (1934–1953; 100 issues)
- Mobsters
- The Phantom Detective
- Popular Detective
- Popular Love
- Popular Sports Magazine
- Popular Western
- RAF Aces
- Range Riders Western (1938–1953; 72 issues)
- Rio Kid Western
- Rodeo Romances
- Sky Fighters
- Space Stories (1952-1953, 5 issues)
- Startling Stories (1939–1955; 99 issues)(Following the cancellation of Captain Future in 1944 due to wartime paper restrictions, several CF novels appeared in this magazine immediately, and several short stories in the early 50s)
- Strange Stories (1939-1941, 13 issues)
- The Rio Kid Western (1939–1953; 76 issues)
- Texas Rangers
- Thrilling Adventures (1931–1943)
- Thrilling Baseball
- Thrilling Detective (1931–53; 213 issues)
- Thrilling Football
- Thrilling Love
- Thrilling Mystery
- Thrilling Ranch
- Thrilling Sports
- Thrilling Western
- West
- Thrilling Wonder Stories (1936–55, 112 issues)
- Wonder Story Annual (1950-1953, 4 issues)

== See also ==
- Standard Comics - Pines' comic book company, also used the Better Publications name for some titles
- Popular Library - Pines' paperback book company

== Sources ==
- Wooley, John and Locke, John. "A History of the Thrilling Pulps." Thrilling Detective Heroes. Adventure House, 2007.
