= Joseph Samachson =

American writer (1906–1980)

Joseph Samachson (October 13, 1906 – June 2, 1980) was an American scientist and writer, primarily of science fiction and comic books.

== Biography ==
Joseph Samachson was born on October 13, 1906, in Trenton, New Jersey, the son of Russian Jewish parents, Anna (Roshansky) and David Louis Samachson, a businessman.

Samachson died of complications from Parkinson's disease on June 2, 1980, in Chicago, Illinois. He had a son, Michael Samachson, and a daughter, the photographer Miriam Berkley.

== Career ==
=== Biochemist ===
A graduate of Rutgers University, he earned a Ph.D. in chemistry from Yale at the age of 23. He was an assistant professor at the College of Medicine, University of Illinois. He also headed a laboratory in metabolic research at the Veterans Administration Hospital in Hines, Illinois, a research unit dealing with diseases that affect the skeleton. Comics historian Jerry Bails wrote that Samachson worked as a research chemist for the American Molasses Company until 1938, leaving to become a "freelance technical writer".

=== Author ===
As a writer, Samachson translated several scientific papers. He also wrote science fiction and comics.

==== Science fiction and pulps ====
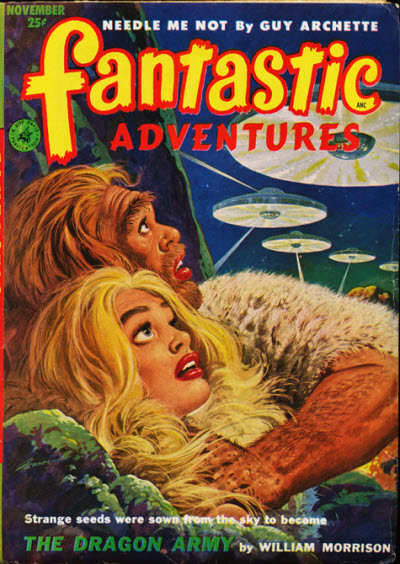
Samachson's novella "The Dragon Army", written under his "William Morrison" byline, was the cover story in the November 1952 issue of Fantastic Adventures

He wrote many science fiction works (under the pseudonym William Morrison), including two novels published in Startling Stories, the 1937 pulp title Murder of a Professor and short stories for several magazines, including Money from Heaven (1942). He also penned a couple of Captain Future pulp novels c.1941–1942 (under the house name "Brett Sterling"), and had work appear in the science fiction magazine Galaxy. Gnome Press published Mel Oliver and Space Rover on Mars in1954. and was also published in a Dutch translation.

==== Comics ====
He is believed to have begun working for DC Comics in late 1942, working on comics scripts for characters notably including Batman. He also wrote scripts for comics and characters including Sandman, Green Arrow, Airwave and Robotman, as well as "a string of 17 science-fiction stories in 1955 and 1956".

In 1955, he created (with artist Joe Certa) the Martian Manhunter in the pages of Detective Comics #225. Usually credited as author on the initial strip, some commentators believe that he may have produced the plot, but that writer Jack Miller (who most believe succeeded Samachson in writing the character with the next issue), may have produced the first script. Don Markstein's Toonopedia also suggests that Samachson wrote "many subsequent" appearances of J'Onn J'Onzz rather than just the first. Jerry Bails also lists Samachson as having co-created the historical DC character Tomahawk. In 1943 Samachson also created the character Two-Gun Percy, which first appeared under the DC Comics imprint All Funny Comics and was drawn by Bernard Baily.

In 1975, DC Comics adapted an unused story he wrote in the 1940s featuring the Seven Soldiers of Victory into a six-part serial in Adventure Comics #438-443.

==== Television ====
Samachson also wrote scripts for Captain Video and His Video Rangers.

=== Other work ===
With his wife Dorothy Samachson, he wrote about theater ("Let's Meet the Theatre" and "The Dramatic Story of the Theatre"), music ("Masters of Music" and The Fabulous World of Opera), ballet, archeology (Good Digging) and a number of other titles, including Rome, a Rand McNally "Cities of the World" title.

In addition, Samachson was a frequent contributor to scientific journals and the author of The Armor Within Us: The Story of Bone.
