= T. O'Conor Sloane =

American scientist

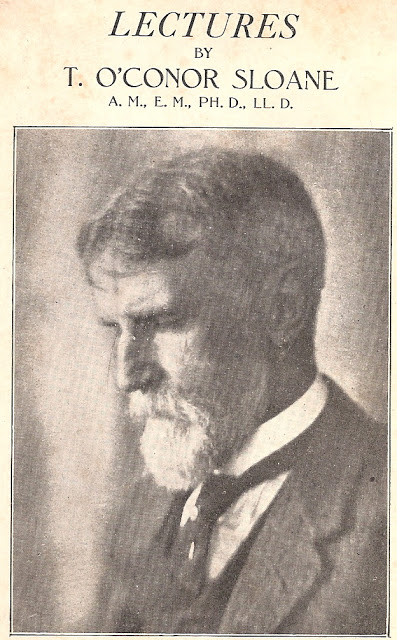
T. O'Conor Sloane (c. 1920s)

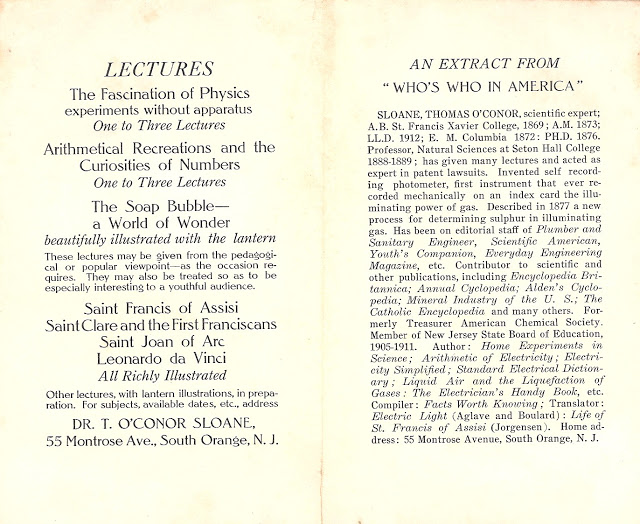
promotional pamphlet (c. 1920s)

Thomas O'Conor Sloane (November 24, 1851 – August 7, 1940) was an American scientist, inventor, author, editor, educator, and linguist, perhaps best known for writing The Standard Electrical Dictionary and as the editor of Scientific American, from 1886 to 1896 and the first science fiction magazine, Amazing Stories, from 1929 to 1938.

== Life and career ==
Sloane was born in New York City in 1851, eventually moving to South Orange, New Jersey while maintaining work offices in New York City.

=== Education ===
Sloane was academically exceptional, graduating with an A.B. from the College of St. Francis Xavier in NYC in 1869 at only eighteen years of age. He then earned an E.M from Columbia University in NYC in 1872, an A.M. from the College of St. Francis Xavier in 1873, a Ph.D. in electrical engineering from Columbia University in 1876 and later, an LL.D. from the College of St. Francis Xavier. It has also been stated that Sloane held a Ph.D. in chemistry, although beyond his extensive professional experience in the field of chemistry there does not seem to be evidence to support this.

=== Early career ===
Sloane was employed as a chemist by the N.Y. Gas Light Co. in 1872 and in 1877 as chief engineer for Citizens' Gas Light Co. in Brooklyn.

=== Self-recording photometer for gas power ===
Sloane's best known invention, introduced in 1878, was the self-recording photometer for gas power — the first instrument to mechanically register the illuminating power of natural gas. He was granted a patent for the invention January 29, 1884. In 1877, Sloane had described a new process for determining sulphur in natural gas. He also served as a scientific expert in patent lawsuits.

=== Works ===
Sloane was the author of The Standard Electrical Dictionary, first published in 1892, as well as Arithmetic of Electricity: A Practical Treatise on Electrical Calculations, Electricity Simplified: The Practice and Theory of Electricity, Questions and Answers About Electricity: A First Book for Students: Theory of Electricity and Magnetism, Electric Toy Making for Amateurs, How to Become a Successful Electrician, The Electrician's Handy Book, Practical Electricity, An Electrical Library, Elementary Electrical Calculations, A Manual of Simple Engineering Mathematics: Covering the Whole Field of Direct Current Calculations, Speed and Fun with Figures, Rapid Arithmetic: Quick and Special Methods in Arithmetical Calculation, Fortunes in Formulas for Home, Farm, and Workshop, Henley's Twentieth Century Book of Formulas, Processes and Trade Secrets, Motion Picture Projection, Liquid Air and the Liquefaction of Gases, Home Experiments in Science, Rubber Hand Stamps and the Manipulation of India Rubber, Facts Worth Knowing and others; including translations into English of Saint Francis of Assisi: A Biography written by Johannes Jorgensen and The Electric Light: Its History, Production, and Applications by Alglave and Boulard.

A copy of Electric Toy Making for Amateurs is held by the Smithsonian Libraries.

Sloane was also a prodigious contributor to many and various scientific and other publications such as the Encyclopædia Britannica, Annual Cyclopedia, Alden's Cyclopedia, The Catholic Encyclopedia, The Independent, The Times newspaper (London) and Popular Science.

=== Scientific American ===
Sloane was the editor of Scientific American from 1886 to 1896, contributing over fifty scientific articles to the magazine during his tenure. Sloane also served on the editorial staff of several other popular periodicals such as Everyday Engineering Magazine, Plumber and Sanitary Engineer, Youth's Companion, The Experimenter (formerly, Practical Electrics) and Science and Invention (formerly, The Electrical Experimenter).

=== Seton Hall University ===
Sloane was a professor of natural sciences and higher mathematics at Seton Hall University in South Orange, New Jersey, having first joined the faculty in 1883 and teaching there non-continuously through the 1890s. In 1894, Sloane was elected to the Board of Trustees, while also continuing in his capacity as a member of the faculty.

=== New Jersey State Board of Education ===
Sloane was a member of the New Jersey State Board of Education (1905–11) and lectured in its educational series for several years.

=== American Chemical Society ===
Sloane served as treasurer for the American Chemical Society from 1882 to 1886 and wrote articles about the US mineral industry for the Journal of the American Chemical Society.

=== Chemical Institute of New York ===
For many years Sloane was the educational director of the Chemical Institute of New York, which provided a distance-learning course of study in chemistry. The courses were copyrighted. The institute advertised heavily in the periodicals of the day (magazine ad for the Chemical Institute of New York, 1922), like Popular Mechanics, Popular Science, Amazing Stories, Radio-Craft and The Experimenter.

=== Amazing Stories ===
Sloane was involved with Hugo Gernsback's Amazing Stories from the very beginning, his editorial work at The Experimenter and Science and Invention magazines, published by Gernsback's Experimenter Publishing led to Sloane's involvement with Amazing Stories when Gernsback merged the two magazines, devoting the editorial and printing time, resources and distribution from The Experimenter to the newly created Amazing Stories and retaining Sloane to edit the magazine with Gernsback having the final say over the fiction content (see also, history of US science fiction and fantasy magazines to 1950). Sloane served as the managing editor for the first issue of Amazing Stories (April 1926) and as the associate editor from the second issue (May 1926) on. His role in the magazine production continued to grow and in 1929 when B. A. MacKinnon purchased Experimenter Publishing then sold it to Bernarr Macfadden, Sloane was named editor (November 1929 issue). Of note, Sloane's managing editor at Amazing Stories was Miriam Bourne, in a time when women were particularly underrepresented in the science fiction publishing world; as well, Sloane and later, Raymond A. Palmer, advanced and expanded upon Gernsback's mandate for the magazine, actively publishing women SF writers, poets and science journalists, progressing the industry.

Sloane was one of several stockholders owning significant shares in the Experimenter Publishing Company, Inc., New York, NY.

Sloane published first stories by science fiction authors including John W. Campbell, Jr., Eando Binder, John Russell Fearn, S. P. Meek, John Benyon Harris, Henry Hasse and E. E. "Doc" Smith and a first poem by Frederik Pohl. Sloane published a first science fiction story by Howard Fast, early work by Neil R. Jones, Charles R. Tanner, Lloyd Arthur Eshbach, Edmond Hamilton, Harold Vincent Schoepflin (Harl Vincent), David H. Keller, Miles J. Breuer, Stanton A. Coblentz, George Henry Weiss (Francis Flagg), Alfred Johannes Olsen (Bob Olsen) and Leslie Francis Silberberg (Leslie F. Stone), one of the first women writing science fiction pulp; and as associate editor was directly involved in the publication of first stories by Philip Francis Nowlan, Jack Williamson, Alpheus Hyatt Verrill and many other important science fiction writers, including Clare Winger Harris, one of the first women writing science fiction and who is credited with being the first woman to publish stories using her own name in science fiction magazines. During Sloane's tenure as associate editor, the magazine published "The Colour Out of Space" by H. P. Lovecraft, in the September 1927 issue. As editor, Sloane is credited with accepting but not publishing the first science fiction story written by Clifford D. Simak who submitted "Cubes of Ganymede" to Amazing Stories early in 1931. Sloane held onto the story for years, finally returning it to Simak as being outdated.

Sloane also managed to publish a story, "The Universal Merry-Go-Round" by Roger Bird in the April 1933 edition of Amazing Stories that science fiction historian Mike Ashley refers to as "what could arguably be called the worst story ever published in an American sf magazine....This story is so bad as to be compulsive reading, and no plot summary can do it justice." On the other hand, he published the only stories of the equally unknown W. K. Sonneman, who science fiction historian Sam Moskowitz considered to be a "writer among writers" and a "'master' of science fiction."

==== Professor Jameson ====
Sloane published the first Professor Jameson story by Neil R. Jones, "The Jameson Satellite," launching the series and publishing the next eleven stories. The series was among the most popular in the science fiction pulp magazines of the 1930s and Isaac Asimov credits it as being an influence on his own science fiction writing. Frederik Pohl was also a fan of the Professor Jameson stories which have become the longest surviving series in science fiction.

==== Buck Rogers ====
Sloane was the associate editor of Amazing Stories when the first Buck Rogers story, a novella, "Armageddon - 2419 A.D." by Phillip Francis Nowlan was published in the August 1928 edition of Amazing Stories. By early 1929, Buck Rogers was appearing as a syndicated comic strip and inspired the creation of Flash Gordon, John Carter of Mars and others. "The Airlords of Han," a sequel, was published in the March 1929 issue of Amazing Stories. In 1960, these two novellas were combined into one novel, titled Armageddon 2419 A.D.(no longer included the dash in the title).

==== The first space opera ====
Sloane was the associate editor of Amazing Stories when the first space opera, "The Skylark of Space" by E. E. "Doc" Smith was published in the August 1928 edition of Amazing Stories. Science fiction historians Sam Moskowitz and Joe Sanders state that Sloane, while associate editor, accepted "The Skylark of Space" for publication. As editor, Sloane published the second installment, "Skylark Three," as a three-part serial in the August to October 1930 issues of Amazing Stories. Smith's novel, Spacehounds of IPC, serialized in the August, September, and October 1931 issues of the magazine, introduced the term "tractor beam" to the popular culture.

==== The scholarly octogenarian ====
Much discussion by science fiction fans and historians has surrounded assigning credit during the Gernsback era to the various editors of Amazing Stories for publishing first works by writers during this early period of the genre, who then went on to become giants of science fiction, based on the chronology of their job title on the masthead of Amazing Stories. Additionally, the octogenarian Sloane has been criticized for routinely taking an inordinate amount of time to respond to writers anxious to hear back from Amazing Stories on the status of their submission, such as with Simak's work or that of Malcolm Afford and Raymond Z. Gallun, and on one occasion famously losing a manuscript, Invaders from the Infinite by John W. Campbell, Jr. (later found, Sloane published it in Amazing Stories Quarterly). Some context provides a measure of insight regarding these matters. Science fiction historian Mike Ashley writes in The Time Machines: The Story of the Science-Fiction Pulp Magazines from the Beginning to 1950 (Liverpool University Press, 2000): "Essentially Sloane was the editor. He read the new fiction and moulded the magazine's contents, leaving the gimmickry and ideas to Gernsback." During the subsequent transition of Amazing Stories' ownership, Ashley writes: "Gernsback was no longer its editor. Although Miriam Bourne was by now Managing Editor, Arthur Lynch was brought in as Editor-in-Chief. However the main job was done by Sloane. The change came with the May 1929 issue, and by the November 1929 issue Sloane was fully in charge." Science fiction historians Peter Nicholls and John Clute support Ashley's work in their book The Encyclopedia of Science Fiction (Granada, 1979) by stating that Sloane "carried much responsibility for the actual running of the magazines [Amazing Stories and Amazing Stories Quarterly], though they were in the overall charge of, successively, Hugo Gernsback and Arthur Lynch. He succeeded to the editorship...in 1929." Eric Davin in Pioneers of Wonder (Prometheus Books, 1999) states "and T. O'Conor Sloane, Amazing's associate editor (who handled the actual editorial chores)...." Alexei Panshin, writing in Fantastic Stories and with Cory Panshin in SF in Dimension: A Book of Explorations, states that Sloane had been "editor-in-fact" for Gernsback. This is also treated by science fiction historian Gary Westfahl, writing in DePauw University's journal Science Fiction Studies.

==== Cover art ====
In 1933, Sloane experimented with a series of surreal cover art for Amazing Stories by artist A. Sigmond which science fiction historian Mike Ashley states were revolutionary for their time but were not warmly received by the readership. Leo Morey was a prodigious producer of cover art for Amazing Stories; Hans Waldemar Wessolowski (Wesso) also produced cover art for the magazine.

==== Space travel ====
Sloane's editorial essays for the March and July 1930 issues of Amazing Stories detail why he did not believe that space travel was possible. His doubt in the matter was a scientific one, believing that the pilot of a rocket ship attaining escape velocity would be crushed by the g-force experienced. It was not until the high-altitude and centrifuge tests of the late 1950s that this question was answered.

==== Gernsback and Sloane ====
Gernsback and Sloane had a long and productive working relationship that began in 1920 and continued through Gernsback's departure from Amazing Stories. Gernsback and Sloane believed that science fiction should promote science and technology and that the stories published in Amazing Stories should be as scientifically plausible as possible, with Sloane in particular emphasizing this. Sloane may have collaborated with Gernsback in originating the term "scientifiction" which was superseded by "science fiction" to describe this genre, as suggested in part by the first issue of Amazing Stories.

==== Ziff-Davis ====
In 1938, publisher Ziff-Davis bought the magazine and moved its production from New York City to Chicago, naming Raymond A. Palmer as Sloane's successor.

=== Amazing Stories Quarterly ===
From 1929 to 1934, Sloane was the editor of Amazing Stories Quarterly, which had begun publication in 1928 with Sloane serving as the associate editor, it was the companion publication to Amazing Stories and the successor to Amazing Stories Annual; it ceased production in 1934. Featuring a complete novel in each edition as well as short stories, Amazing Stories Quarterly published, particularly during the early 1930s, what science fiction historians Mike Ashley, Brian Stableford, Milton Wolf, Robert Silverberg and others regard to be important work in the genre and among the best early pulp science fiction novels.

=== 2014 Retro Hugo Award ===
Sloane was nominated for the 2014 Retro Hugo Award in the Best Editor, Short Form award category but fell below the nominations cutoff by one vote.

== Family ==
Sloane married Isabel Mitchel, who was born (September 1852) in Van Diemen's Land to John Mitchel and Jane "Jenny" Mitchel; she died in childbirth (1879). Sloane's son, T. O'Conor Sloane, Jr. became a well-known photographer; another son, John Eyre Sloane, an airplane factory owner, married Thomas Alva Edison's daughter Madeleine in 1914; their four sons were Edison's only grandchildren. Sloane's grandson was T. O'Conor Sloane III, a senior editor at Doubleday. Sloane's grandfather was Thomas O'Conor, a journalist and author who established three newspapers, the Military Monitor, the Shamrock and the Globe.

Sloane's great-great-grandson is Justin T. O'Conor Sloane, an author, publisher and the editor of Worlds of IF magazine and Galaxy Science Fiction magazine.

== Death ==
Sloane died in 1940 in South Orange, New Jersey.

== Bibliography ==
- The Standard Electrical Dictionary
- Arithmetic of Electricity: A Practical Treatise on Electrical Calculations
- Electricity Simplified: The Practice and Theory of Electricity
- Questions and Answers About Electricity: A First Book for Students: Theory of Electricity and Magnetism
- Electric Toy Making for Amateurs
- How to Become a Successful Electrician
- The Electrician's Handy Book
- Practical Electricity
- An Electrical Library
- Elementary Electrical Calculations
- A Manual of Simple Engineering Mathematics: Covering the Whole Field of Direct Current Calculations
- Speed and Fun with Figures
- Rapid Arithmetic: Quick and Special Methods in Arithmetical Calculation
- Fortunes in Formulas for Home, Farm, and Workshop
- Henley's Twentieth Century Book of Formulas, Processes and Trade Secrets
- Motion Picture Projection
- Liquid Air and the Liquefaction of Gases
- Home Experiments in Science
- Rubber Hand Stamps and the Manipulation of India Rubber
- Facts Worth Knowing
