= Bridge of Light =

(The) Bridge of Light may refer to:

- Bridge of Light (album), a 1994 album by Keith Jarrett
- Bridge of Light (song), a 2011 song by Pink
- The Bridge of Light (novel), a science fiction novel by A. Hyatt Verrill
- The Bridge of Light (album), a 2008 album by Apocalypse
