= Refúgio =

Studio album by Apocalypse
- Released: 2003
- Genre: Progressive rock
- Label: Rock Symphony
- Producer: Apocalypse

Apocalypse chronology
Apocalypse Live in USA (2000)	Refúgio (2003)	Apocalypse Live in Rio (2007)

Refúgio is the fifth studio album by Brazilian rock band Apocalypse, released in 2003 and the second under Rock Symphony Record Company. Musically, Refúgio features symphonic rock with complex arrangements for keyboards, including organ, piano, digital synthesizer, analog minimoog synthesizer, drums and electric guitar. Refúgio album contains some fan favorites such as the album’s title track and the two progressive epics Cachoeira das Águas Douradas (Waterfall of Golden Waters) and América do Sul (South America). The band included two bonus tracks from the USA Live recordings Último Horizonte and Terra Azul. The album was to be the last recordings with the band's original lineup.

== Track listing ==
1. Refúgio
2. Cachoeira das Águas Douradas
3. Viagem no Tempo
4. América do Sul
5. Toccata
6. Amazônia
7. ProgJazz
8. Liberdade
9. Lembranças Eternas
10. III Milênio
11. Último Horizonte (bonus track(
12. Terra Azul (bonus track)

== Musicians ==
- Eloy Fritsch: Electronic keyboards, Organ, Minimoog, vocals
- Ruy Fritsch: Electric and acoustic guitars, vocals
- Chico Fasoli: Drums, percussion, vocals
- Chico Casara: Lead Vocal, Bass guitar
