= Space music (disambiguation) =

Space music is music that facilitates the experience of contemplative spaciousness.

- Spatial music, music that exploits the physical dimensions of space
- Space-themed music, music of any genre with themes or lyrics about outer space
- Space Music (album) by Eloy Fritsch
- Space age pop, certain musical styles popular in the 1950s and early 1960s
- Space disco, the fusion of disco music with futuristic themes
- Space rock, a musical genre related to 1970s progressive rock

== See also ==
- Space (disambiguation)
- Cosmic music (disambiguation)
