= Apocalypse Live in Rio =

Live album by Apocalypse
- Released: 2007
- Genre: Progressive rock
- Label: Rock Symphony / Musea
- Producer: Rock Symphony

Apocalypse chronology
Refúgio (2003)	Apocalypse Live in Rio (2007)	The Bridge of Light (2008)

Apocalypse Live in Rio is the second live album by Brazilian progressive rock band Apocalypse. It was released in 2007. In September 2005, Apocalypse was invited to the Rock Symphony for the Record Festival at the Teatro Municipal de Niterói, Rio de Janeiro, Brazil. The band's concert, on 8 September, was taped for posterity and released in DVD and CD format. In this project Apocalypse recorded some of their old hits in the English language.

== Track listing ==
1. Cut
2. South America
3. Refuge
4. Mirage
5. Blue Earth
6. Magic
7. Waterfall Of Golden Waters
8. Tears
9. Time Traveller
10. Coming From The Stars Medley
11. Peace In The Loneliness

== Musicians ==
- Eloy Fritsch: electronic keyboards, organ, Minimoog, vocals
- Ruy Fritsch: electric and acoustic guitars, vocals
- Chico Fasoli: drums, percussion, vocals
- Gustavo Demarchi: lead vocals, flute
- Magoo Wise: bass guitar
