= Apocalypse (Apocalypse album) =

Studio album by Apocalypse
- Released: 1991
- Genre: Progressive rock
- Label: Acit Records
- Producer: Apocalypse

Apocalypse chronology
Apocalypse (1991)	Perto do Amanhecer (1995)

Apocalypse is the self-titled debut album by the Brazilian progressive rock band founded by Eloy Fritsch and friends to participate in a student festival in 1983, though with a different lineup. The trio of musicians signed with Acit Records in 1990 and traveled to Porto Alegre to record their first release. The material on Apocalypse was written mostly by keyboardist Fritsch. Fritsch's songs were generally longer and more elaborate and featured mystical lyrics which reflected his interest in science fiction, cosmos and nature. At the time of their first self-titled LP release, they interrupted the traffic in their town's main street and gave a concert for over 2,000 people.

== Track listing ==
All tracks by Eloy Fritsch except where noted.

1. "Eu Brilho em Você" – 3:06
2. "Luzes da Vida" – 3:26
3. "Sozinho, perdido dentro de mim" (Chico Casara, Fritsch) – 4:08
4. "Caçador de Máquinas" – 3:02
5. "Sentinela" – 4:37
6. "Lavender" (Derek William Dick, Mark Kelly, Ian Mosley, Steve Rothery, Pete Trewavas) – 2:38
7. "Miragem" – 4:20
8. "Momentos perdidos" (Casara, Chico Fasoli, Fritsch) – 3:00
9. "Virada do Século" – 2:30
10. "Só você" (Casara, Fritsch) – 3:05
11. "Sombra do meu ser" – 5:05

== Personnel ==
- Eloy Fritsch – Electronic keyboards, vocoder, piano.
- Chico Fasoli – drums, percussion
- Chico Casara – lead vocal, bass guitar
