= Aurora dos Sonhos =

Studio album by Apocalypse
- Released: 1996
- Genre: Progressive rock
- Length: 53:53
- Label: Musea Records
- Producer: Apocalypse

Apocalypse chronology
Perto do Amanhecer (1995)	Aurora dos Sonhos (1996)	Lendas Encantadas (1997)

Aurora dos Sonhos is the third studio album by the Brazilian progressive rock group Apocalypse. One year after Perto do Amanhecer, Apocalypse released Aurora dos Sonhos through Musea Records. The album dealt with issues like conservation of nature, science fiction and spirituality. The tracks scan the fields of neo prog and symphonic rock with comfort.

It was rated three out of five stars by AllMusic.

== Track listing ==
1. "Jamais Retornarei" – 6:23
2. "Em Apenas Um Segundo" – 6:34
3. "Ultimo Horizonte" – 12:54
4. "A Um Passo Da Eternidade" – 9:52
5. "Do Outro Lado Da Vida" – 9:57
6. "Vindo Das Estrelas" – 12:13

== Personnel ==
- Eloy Fritsch: Synthesizer, Piano, organ, moog, vocals
- Ruy Fritsch: Electric and acoustic guitars, vocals
- Chico Fasoli: Drums, percussion, vocals
- Chico Casara: Lead Vocal, Bass guitar
