= Lendas Encantadas =

Studio album by Apocalypse
- Released: 1997
- Genre: Progressive rock
- Label: Musea
- Producer: Apocalypse

Apocalypse chronology
Aurora dos Sonhos (1996)	Lendas Encantadas (1997)	The Best of Apocalypse (1998)

Lendas Encantadas is the fourth album by Brazilian progressive rock band Apocalypse. It is a reissue of their first work (available in LP format only, titled Apocalypse) with all lyrics in Portuguese. The difference is that one track was completely re-recorded ("Sozinho, Perdido Dentro de Mim") and the guitar parts are added to this CD. Three bonus tracks recorded in 1992–1993 ("Mesmo que não Haja Nada", "Levando a Vida" and "Chamando por Ajuda – Crying for Help – Portuguese version") were also included.

== Track listing ==
1. Miragem
2. Virada do Século
3. Sombra do Meu Ser
4. Sentinela
5. Luzes da Vida
6. Sozinho Perdido Dentro de Mim
7. Caçador de Máquinas
8. Mesmo que não Haja Nada
9. Chamando por Ajuda
10. Levando a Vida

== Personnel ==
- Eloy Fritsch: Piano, organ, moog, Vocoder, vocals
- Ruy Fritsch: Electric and acoustic guitars, vocals
- Chico Fasoli: Drums, percussion, vocals
- Chico Casara: Lead Vocal, Bass guitar
