= 2012 Light Years from Home =

Studio album by Apocalypse
- Released: 2011
- Genre: Progressive rock
- Length: 61:48
- Label: Financiarte
- Producer: Apocalypse

Apocalypse chronology
Magic Spells (2010)	2012 Light Years from Home (2011)

2012 Light Years from Home is the seventh studio release by Brazilian progressive rock band Apocalypse.

2012 Light Years from Home was released in The 25th Anniversary Box Set that also has a live CD called Magic Spells, a DVD called The 25th Anniversary Concert and a book written by Eliton Tomasi called The 25th Anniversary Book – The Apocalypse History that tells the 25 years band's history.

== Track listing ==
No.	Title	Length
1.	"New Sunrise"	5:25
2.	"Set me Free"	3:22
3.	"Take my Heart"	3:27
4.	"The Angel and Seven Trumpets"	5:24
5.	"On the Way to the Stars"	4:25
6.	"Till Another Side"	5:08
7.	"Morning Light"	4:40
8.	"Find me Now"	2:35
9.	"A Cry in the Infinity"	4:28
10.	"To Kiss the Tears You Cry"	5:51
11.	"Blue Angel"	3:24
12.	"2012 Light Years from Home"	13:39

== Musicians ==
- Eloy Fritsch: electronic keyboards, organ, Minimoog, bass guitar, vocals
- Ruy Fritsch: electric and acoustic guitars
- Fabio Schneider: drums, percussion
- Gustavo Demarchi: lead vocals, flute
