= Apocalypse Live in USA =

Live album by Apocalypse
- Released: 2000
- Genre: Progressive rock
- Label: Rock Symphony
- Producer: Apocalypse

Apocalypse chronology
The Best of Apocalypse (1998)	Apocalypse Live in USA (2000)	Refúgio (2003)

Apocalypse Live in USA is the first live album by Brazilian progressive rock group Apocalypse. The Rock Symphony Record Company released the band's double-live album recorded at North Carolina including a multimedia track with the band's history, discography, video clips, and photos. The tracks were taken from their previous CDs released by Musea Records, but there are also the Refúgio album tracks "América do Sul," "ProgJazz," and "Toccata." There is also a track called "Clássicos," which features rock versions of songs by Grieg ("In the Hall of the Mountain King"), Beethoven ("Symphony No. 9"), Bach ("Minuet From the Notebook of Ana Magdalena Bach"), Mozart ("Rondo Alla Turca, From Sonata in A"), and Tchaikovsky ("Russian Dance" from The Nutcracker Suite). Also, "Paz da Solidão" features Ravel ("Boléro").

== Track listing ==
1. "Carmina Burana" (Carl Orff) – Rock Version (5:15)
2. "Último Horizonte" (5:01)
3. "Terra Azul" (8:21)
4. "Clássicos" – Rock Version (Apocalypse) (3:58)
5. "Corta" (6:11)
6. "A Paz da Solidão" (3:35)
7. "ProgJazz" (2:54)
8. "Jamais Retornarei" (6:05)
9. "Miragem" (4:34)

== Personnel ==
- Eloy Fritsch – hammond organ, minimoog, electronic keyboards, vocals
- Ruy Fritsch – electric and acoustic guitars, vocals
- Chico Fasoli – drums, percussion, vocals
- Chico Casara – lead vocal, bass guitar
