= Behind the Walls of Imagination =

Studio album by Eloy Fritsch
- Released: 1997
- Genre: New-age, electronic, progressive rock
- Length: 59:13
- Label: Atração
- Producer: Eloy Fritsch

Eloy Fritsch chronology
Dreams (1996)	Behind the Walls of Imagination (1997)	Space Music (1998)

Professional ratings
Review scores
Source	Rating
AllMusic	4/5 stars

Behind the Walls of Imagination is the second album by new age artist Eloy Fritsch, known for his work in progressive rock group Apocalypse.

AllMusic's Cesar Lanzarini noted that compared with Fritsch's debut "there are less references to several electronic music schools; his efforts are concentrated on a symphonic, progressive style".

== Track listing ==
1. "Overture" – 1:29
2. "Flying over the Rainbow" – 4:15
3. "Eternity" – 7:45
4. "Quasar" – 4:01
5. "The Journey Starts Now" – 5:50
6. "Behind the Walls of Imagination" – 8:33
7. "Cosmic Winds" – 4:01
8. "Floating Free Between Stars" – 6:12
9. "Tropical Birds" – 3:08
10. "Triumph Hymn" – 3:36
11. "The Last Frontier" – 2:24
12. "Centaur" – 4:23
13. "The Fortress of Solitude" – 3:17
