= Perto do Amanhecer =

Studio album by Apocalypse
- Released: 1995
- Genre: Progressive rock
- Label: Musea
- Producer: Apocalypse

Apocalypse chronology
Apocalypse (1991)	Perto do Amanhecer (1995)	Aurora dos Sonhos (1996)

Professional ratings
Review scores
Source	Rating
Allmusic	4.5/5 stars

Perto do Amanhecer is the second studio album by Brazilian progressive rock group Apocalypse. The compositions are in the symphonic prog rock way with influences of progressive British bands such as Yes, Marillion, IQ, Genesis and Emerson, Lake & Palmer. Keyboardist Eloy Fritsch's Minimoog solos and synthesizers are present on all tracks of this CD. The album has some classical moments and even hard rock passages. The lyrics are in Portuguese and deal with several themes, such as existentialism, nature, science fiction, and mysticism. Musea invited the band to perform at a compilation, which came later as Le Melleur du Progressif Instrumental. This CD was edited in the end of 1995 with several European bands and Apocalypse representing Brazil with the song "Notre Dame".

== Track listing ==
1. Ao Cair No Espaço
2. Terra Azul
3. Magia
4. Fantasia Mística
5. Notredame
6. Nascente
7. Na Terra Onde as Folhas Caem
8. Lágrimas
9. Corta
10. Paz da Solidão
11. Sob a Luz de Um Olhar

== Personnel ==
- Eloy Fritsch: Synthesizer, Piano, organ, moog
- Ruy Fritsch: Electric and acoustic guitars
- Chico Fasoli: Drums, percussion
- Chico Casara: Lead Vocal, Bass guitar
