= The Best of Apocalypse =

Studio album by Apocalypse
- Released: 1998
- Genre: Progressive rock
- Label: Atração
- Producer: Apocalypse

Apocalypse chronology
Lendas Encantadas (1997)	The Best of Apocalypse (1998)	Apocalypse Live in USA (2000)

The Best of Apocalypse is an album by the Brazilian rock band Apocalypse.

After Apocalypse performed at Planeta Atlântida, the most important pop music festival in the south of Brazil the Atração Fonográfica record label invited Apocalypse to release a compilation. Apocalypse, with the permission of Musea Records, took the best of their three works released by the French label and the CD was released on the Brazilian market.

== Track listing ==
1. "Levando A Vida" (short version) – 4:21
2. "Mesmo Que Não Haja Nada" – 5:01
3. "A Paz Da Solidão" – 3:21
4. "Jamais Retornarei" – 6:22
5. "Sozinho, Perdido Dentro De Mim" – 3:58
6. "Magia" – 5:53
7. "Limites De Vento" – 7:46
8. "Chamando Por Ajuda" – 6:18
9. "Corta" – 6:10
10. "Em Apenas Um Segundo" – 6:30
11. "Lágrimas" – 5:43
12. "Do Outro Lado Da Vida" – 9:54

== Musicians ==
- Eloy Fritsch: Electronic keyboards, piano, Organ, Minimoog, vocals
- Ruy Fritsch: Electric and acoustic guitars, vocals
- Chico Fasoli: Drums, percussion, vocals
- Chico Casara: Lead Vocal, Bass guitar
