= Amazing Stories Quarterly =

U.S. science fiction pulp magazine

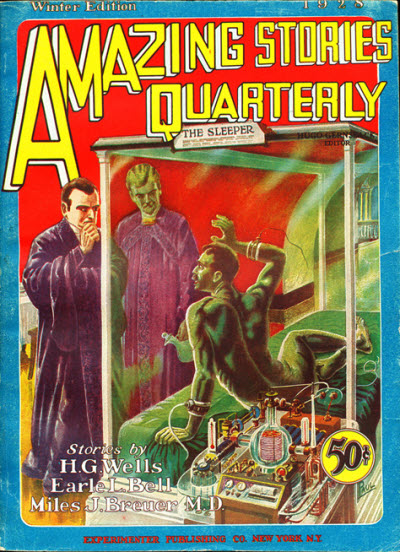
The first issue of Amazing Stories Quarterly, dated Winter 1928. The cover art is by Frank R. Paul for H.G. Wells' story When the Sleeper Wakes. (Note: This cover art closely follows an 1899 illustration by Henri Lanos for the story's original publication.)

Amazing Stories Quarterly was a U.S. science fiction pulp magazine that was published between 1928 and 1934. It was launched by Hugo Gernsback as a companion to his Amazing Stories, the first science fiction magazine, which had begun publishing in April 1926. Amazing Stories had been successful enough for Gernsback to try a single issue of an Amazing Stories Annual in 1927, which had sold well, and he decided to follow it up with a quarterly magazine. The first issue of Amazing Stories Quarterly was dated Winter 1928 and carried a reprint of the 1899 version of H.G. Wells' When the Sleeper Wakes. Gernsback's policy of running a novel in each issue was popular with his readership, though the choice of Wells' novel was less so. Over the next five issues, only one more reprint appeared: Gernsback's own novel Ralph 124C 41+, in the Winter 1929 issue. Gernsback went bankrupt in early 1929, and lost control of both Amazing Stories and Amazing Stories Quarterly; associate editor T. O'Conor Sloane then took over as editor. The magazine began to run into financial difficulties in 1932, and the schedule became irregular; the last issue was dated Fall 1934.

Authors whose work appeared in Amazing Stories Quarterly include Stanton A. Coblentz, Miles J. Breuer, A. Hyatt Verrill, and Jack Williamson. Critical opinions differ on the quality of the fiction Gernsback and Sloane printed: Brian Stableford regards several of the novels as being important early science fiction, but Everett Bleiler comments that few of the stories were of acceptable quality. Milton Wolf and Mike Ashley are more positive in their assessment; they consider the work Sloane published in the early 1930s to be some of the best in the new genre.

== Publication history ==
	Winter	Spring	Summer	Fall	Winter
1928	1/1	1/2	1/3	1/4	
1929	2/1	2/2	2/3	2/4	
1930	3/1	3/2	3/3	3/4	
1931	4/1	4/2	4/3	4/4	
1932	5/1	5/2		5/3	
1933		6/4			7/1
1934				7/2	
Issues of Amazing Stories Quarterly from 1928 to 1934, showing issue numbers, and indicating editors: Gernsback (blue, first six issues), and Sloane (yellow, remaining sixteen issues). Note that the apparent error in numbering starting in 1933 is in fact shown correctly.

Although science fiction (sf) had been published before the 1920s, it did not begin to coalesce into a separately marketed genre until the appearance in 1926 of Amazing Stories, a U.S. pulp magazine published by Hugo Gernsback. The new magazine was successful, and in 1927 Gernsback brought out a double-sized Amazing Stories Annual, which also sold well. These successes convinced him to start a companion magazine to Amazing Stories, titled Amazing Stories Quarterly. The first issue, dated Winter 1928, appeared on newsstands on January 5 that year.

Gernsback went bankrupt in early 1929, and lost control of both Amazing Stories and Amazing Stories Quarterly. After a short period in receivership, they were acquired by Bergan Mackinnon, who sold them on to Bernarr Macfadden's Teck Publications. T. O'Conor Sloane, who had worked on both magazines for Gernsback, took over as editor. In 1932 the magazine, which was probably never very profitable, began to suffer from financial problems, and the quarterly schedule became irregular after the Winter 1932 issue. The last two issues were filled completely with reprints from early issues and from Amazing Stories. The last issue was dated Fall 1934, though the decision to discontinue the magazine was not taken until some time later, as an editorial comment in the May 1935 issue of Amazing Stories mentioned that further issues might still appear.

== Contents ==
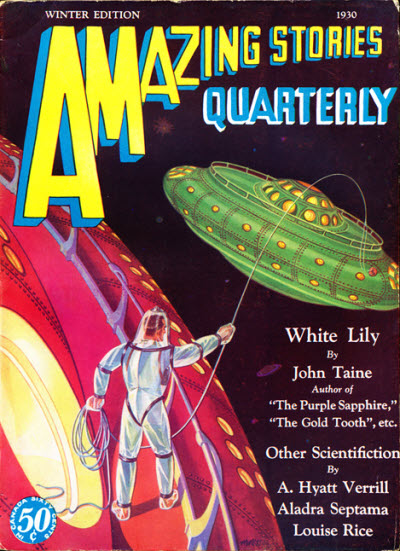
The Winter 1930 issue of Amazing Stories Quarterly. The cover art is by Wesso.

The first issue of Amazing Stories Quarterly contained a reprint of H. G. Wells' novel When the Sleeper Wakes, though for some reason Wells did not provide Gernsback with the revised text published in 1910 under the title The Sleeper Awakes; the text printed was that of the original 1899 edition. The other material in the issue was original, and the following issues included material by Edmond Hamilton, Stanton A. Coblentz, R.F. Starzl, David H. Keller, S.P. Meek, J. Schlossel, and Clare Winger Harris, one of the earliest women writers of sf. Although readers' reactions to the Wells novel were negative, they approved of Gernsback's policy of publishing a novel in each issue. The only other reprint in the early days of the magazine was Gernsback's own novel Ralph 124C 41+, which appeared in the Winter 1929 issue. The novel, set in the year 2660, was little more than a series of predictions about the future tied together by a minor plot. Gernsback included a letter column, and began a competition for the best editorials submitted by readers; the first prize was awarded to Jack Williamson, later to become a successful science fiction writer but at that time just starting his career. Gernsback also started other departments to engage the readers, including book reviews, science quizzes, and science news. The last issue under Gernsback's control was dated Spring 1929; under Sloane's editorship, most of these nonfiction departments ceased.

According to Milton Wolf and Mike Ashley, historians of science fiction, over the next two years Sloane published some of the best sf of the early years of the field in Amazing Stories Quarterly. Wolf and Ashley cite "Paradox", by Charles Cloukey, an early time-travel story; The Bridge of Light, by A. Hyatt Verrill, a novel about a lost civilization in South America; The Birth of a New Republic, by Miles J. Breuer and Jack Williamson, in which a man of the 24th century reminisces about a revolt by the inhabitants of the Moon against the Earth; "Paradise and Iron", by Breuer; and White Lily, by Eric Temple Bell, under the pseudonym John Taine, about a form of crystal life that endangers the planet. After 1931, according to Wolf and Ashley, the fiction in Amazing Stories Quarterly became less entertaining. Everett Bleiler, the author of a detailed review of the first ten years of science fiction magazines, is less complimentary, describing John W. Campbell, Jr.'s space operas, which appeared from 1930 to 1932, as "turgid", and commenting that only a dozen or so of the stories in the magazine's entire run "might have been considered worth reading if one could put oneself back in the 1930s, accepting the standards of the time". Bleiler mentions three authors, Coblentz, Taine, and Breuer, as having produced notably original material, but adds that their work was "not strong enough for mainstream fiction" and had "too little action and too much sophistication for pulp". Bleiler does however agree with Wolf and Ashley that the magazine's quality declined over time. Brian Stableford, in the Science Fiction Encyclopedia, also highlights Coblentz, Taine and Breuer, along with Williamson and Verrill, among the magazine's contributors; Stableford regards their contributions as being among "the most important early pulp sf novels".

== Bibliographic details ==
Amazing Stories Quarterly was published by Gernsback's Experimenter Publishing until Spring 1929. A single issue appeared from Irving Trust, the trustee in Gernsback's bankruptcy; then four issues, from Fall 1929 to Summer 1930, again under the Experimenter Publishing imprint, and then four more from Radio-Science Publications. The last ten issues, from Fall 1931 to Fall 1934, were published by Teck Publishing, of Washington and Dunellen. The magazine was in large pulp format throughout, and was 144 pages long, except for the last two issues, which were 128 pages. It was priced at 50 cents. The first six issues were edited by Gernsback; from the Summer 1929 issue on, the editor was Sloane. There was a Canadian reprint of the final issue, Fall 1934.

Another 27 issues of Amazing Stories Quarterly appeared from Ziff-Davis from 1940 to 1943, and also from 1949 to 1951, but these were not original magazines, only rebound issues of Amazing Stories.

== Sources ==
- Ashley, Mike (2000). The Time Machines: The Story of the Science-Fiction Pulp Magazines from the Beginning to 1950. Liverpool: Liverpool University Press. ISBN 0-85323-865-0.
- Ashley, Mike (2004). "The Gernsback Days". In Ashley, Mike; Lowndes, Robert A.W. (eds.). The Gernsback Days: A Study of the Evolution of Modern Science Fiction From 1911 to 1936. Holicong, Pennsylvania: Wildside. ISBN 0-8095-1055-3.
- Bleiler, Everett F.; Bleiler, Richard J. (1998). Science-Fiction: The Gernsback Years. Westport CT: Kent State University Press. ISBN 0-87338-604-3.
- Edwards, Malcolm; Nicholls, Peter (1993). "SF Magazines". In Clute, John; Nicholls, Peter (eds.). The Encyclopedia of Science Fiction. New York: St. Martin's Press, Inc. pp. 1066–1068. ISBN 0-312-09618-6.
- Wolfe, Milton; Ashley, Mike (1985). "Amazing Stories Quarterly". In Tymn, Marshall B.; Ashley, Mike (eds.). Science Fiction, Fantasy and Weird Fiction Magazines. Westport, Connecticut: Greenwood Press. pp. 51–57. ISBN 0-313-21221-X.
