= Magic Spells =

Live album by Apocalypse
- Released: 2010
- Genre: Progressive rock
- Label: Financiarte
- Producer: Apocalypse

Apocalypse chronology
The Bridge of Light (2008)	Magic Spells (2010)	2012 Light Years from Home (2011)

Magic Spells is the third live album from the Brazilian progressive rock band Apocalypse released on Financiarte label. The album is part of the Apocalypse 25th Anniversary Box Set and was recorded during the Apocalypse tour.

== Track listing ==
1. Refuge (6:31)
2. Crying for Help (6:12)
3. Mirage (4:44)
4. Magic (5:59)
5. Cut (8:48)
6. South America (8:37)
7. Tears (5:49)
8. Blue Earth (8:10)
9. Time Traveller (4:51)
10. Freedom (4:22)
11. Peace in the Loneliness (6:29)
12. Escape (5:41)
13. Not Like You (3:10)

== Musicians ==
- Eloy Fritsch: Electronic keyboards, Organ, Minimoog, vocals
- Ruy Fritsch: Electric and acoustic guitars, vocals
- Chico Fasoli: Drums, percussion, vocals
- Gustavo Demarchi: Lead Vocal
- Magoo Wise: Bass guitar
