= Roland System 700 =

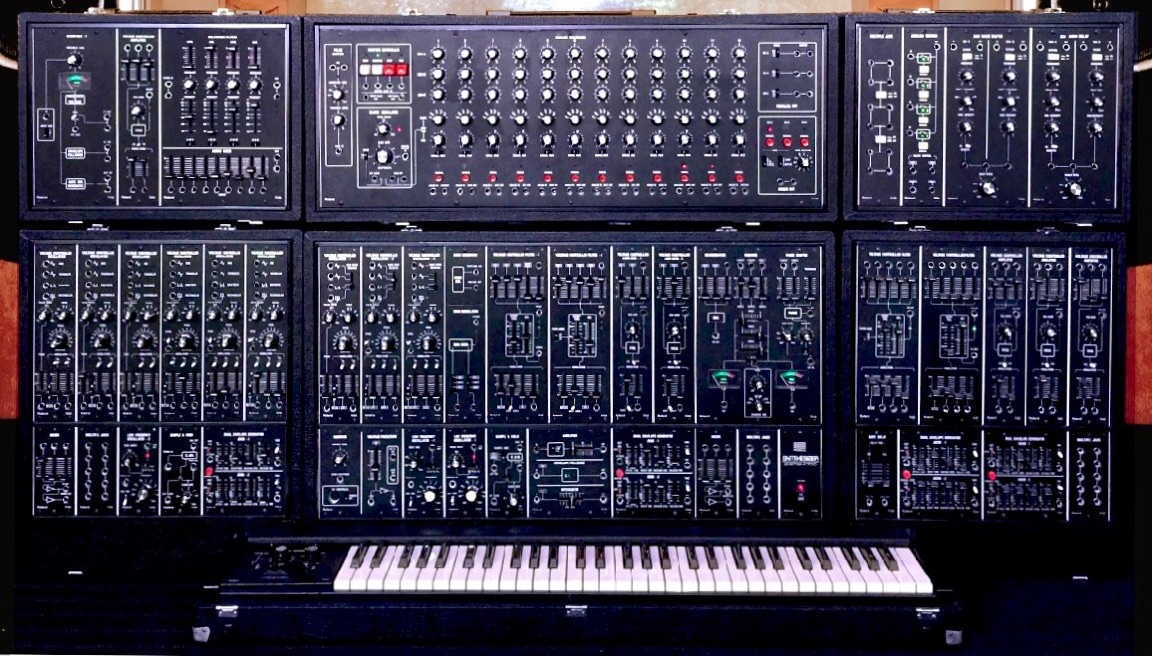

The Roland System 700 was a professional monophonic modular synthesizer for electronic music manufactured by the Roland Corporation and released in 1976 and was followed by the Roland System-100M in 1978.

== Modules ==
The System 700 range included the following modules:

- 701A – Keyboard controller
- 702A – VCO-1
- 702B – VCO-2
- 702C – VCO-3
- 703A – VCF-1
- 703B – VCF-2
- 703G – VCF (Block 8)
- 704A – VCA-1
- 704B – VCA-2
- 704D – VCA (Block 8)
- 705A – Dual envelope generator
- 706A – LFO-1
- 706B – LFO-2
- 707A – Amplifier / envelope follower / integrator
- 708A – Noise / ring generator
- 709A – Sample and hold
- 710A – Multiple jacks
- 711A – Reverberator / panning / standard oscillator / phase shifter
- 712A – Monitor / external keyboard controller / voltage processor / keyboard CV output / gate output
- 713A - Gate delay
- 714A – Interface
- 715A – Multi-mode filter/Audio mixer
- 716A – Mixer (Signal/CV)
- 717A – Analog sequencer
- 718A – Power Supply
- 720B – 2 Channel Phase Shifter
- 721A – 2 Channel Audio Delay
- 723A – Analog Switch

== Blocks ==
The following blocks were offered, as suggested combinations of modules:

- Block 1: The main console – 702A, 702B, 702C, 708A, 703A, 703B, 704A, 704B, 711A; 712A, 705A, 706B, 709A, 707A, 705A, 716A, 710A, 718A
- Block 2: Keyboard controller – 701A
- Block 3: Analog sequencer – 717A
- Block 4: VCO bank – 3x 702D, 3x 702E; 716A, 710A, 706B, 709B, 705A
- Block 5: VCF / VCA bank – 2x 703C, 3x 704C; 713A, 2x 705A, 710A
- Block 6: Interface / mixer – 714A, 704C, 715A
- Block 7: Phase shifter / audio delay – 710B, 723A, 720B, 721A
- Block 8: 'Lab' configuration – 702A, 702B, 702C, 708A, 703G, 704D, 716A, 706A, 709A, 705A, 718A

== Documentation ==
- 101 – Synthesizer instruction manual
- 101 – Synthesizer patch book
- 102 – Expander unit instruction manual
- 102 – Expander unit patch book
- 103 – Audio mixer instruction manual
- 104 – Sequencer instruction manual
- System 700 Synthesizer Service Notes
- System 700 Synthesizer Service Supplement

== Notable users ==
The System 700 was used by many artists, including:

- Rhett Lawrence
- Isao Tomita
- Matthias Becker
- Eric Carmen
- Vince Clarke
- Paul Davis, singer/songwriter and owner of Monarch Sound Atlanta GA
- Eloy Fritsch
- Depeche Mode
- The Human League
- Visage
- Hans Zimmer
- Giorgio Moroder
- Richard Barbieri of Japan
- Kim Wilde
