= The Bridge of Light (novel) =

1929 novel by Alpheus Hyatt Verrill

- Dust-jacket from the first edition
- Author: A. Hyatt Verrill
- Cover artist: Edd Cartier
- Language: English
- Genre: Science fiction
- Publisher: Fantasy Press
- Publication date: 1950
- Publication place: United States
- Media type: Print (hardback)
- Pages: 248
- OCLC: 2198230

The Bridge of Light is a science fiction novel by American writer A. Hyatt Verrill. It was originally published in the Fall 1929 edition of the pulp magazine Amazing Stories Quarterly. It was subsequently republished in book form in 1950 by Fantasy Press in an edition of 2,556 copies.

The novel concerns the search for a lost city in South America.

== Reception ==
P. Schuyler Miller received the novel favorably, saying that Verrill's "picture of the strange magnificence and incongruities of Mayan culture adds a feeling of authenticity to a rather routine plot." Everett F. Bleiler, however, declared it to be "an old-fashioned work," saying it was "not as smoothly written as is usual with the author" and finding "the perils are synthetic" while "the hero's adventures in Mictolan are on the yawn-provoking side." New York Times reviewer Basil Davenport panned the novel severely, saying "This is obviously literature of escape, but any occupation from which one would escape to this must be painful indeed."

== Sources ==
- Chalker, Jack L.; Mark Owings (1998). The Science-Fantasy Publishers: A Bibliographic History, 1923-1998. Westminster, MD and Baltimore: Mirage Press, Ltd. p. 237.
- Tuck, Donald H. (1978). The Encyclopedia of Science Fiction and Fantasy. Chicago: Advent. p. 438. ISBN 0-911682-22-8.

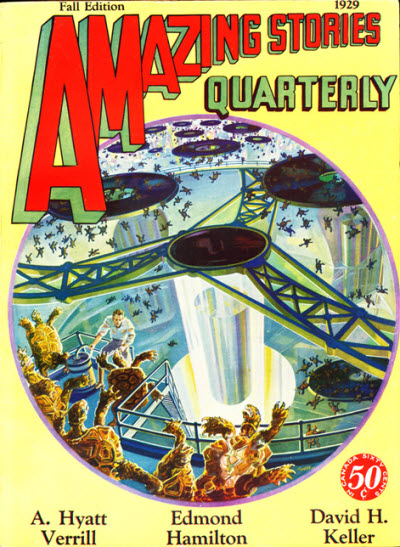
The Bridge of Light was originally published in the Fall 1929 Amazing Stories Quarterly
