= Cyberspace (album) =

Studio album by Eloy Fritsch
- Released: 2000
- Genre: Electronic music, new-age
- Length: 76:00
- Label: Rock Symphony
- Producer: Eloy Fritsch

Eloy Fritsch chronology
| Space Music (1998) | Cyberspace (2000) | Mythology (2001) |

Professional ratings
Review scores
| Source | Rating |
|---|---|
| AllMusic | 3/5 stars |

Cyberspace is the fourth album by the composer Eloy Fritsch.

AllMusic's Cesar Lanzarini described the record as "overflowing with powerful electronic compositions; rich, melodic themes; and dynamic musical movements".

== Track listing ==
1. "Cyberspace" – 4:31
2. "Lost Paradise" – 8:50
3. "Beyond the Ocean Waves" – 5:52
4. "Inside the Heart of Universe" – 4:43
5. "Malacara Canyon" – 6:34
6. "Symphony of Peace" – 6:39
7. "Parallel Dimension" – 6:35
8. "Callisto" – 5:20
9. "Lake of Peace (Movement 1 & 2)" – 11:05
10. "The Arrival of Spaceship" – 3:08
11. "Tales of the Ancient Sphinz" – 4:23
12. "Towards to Sky" – 5:02

== Personnel ==
- Eloy Fritsch – Synthesizer, Arranger, Keyboards, Programming, Wind, Producer, Korg Synthesizer, Sequencing, Cover Design, Mini Moog, Computer Editing, Ensoniq, Korg M1, Roland Synthesizer, Roland Juno 6, Roland JD800
- Marcos Abreu – Mastering
- Carlos Valdes Machado – Photography
- Lauren Veronese – Photography
