= Cosmic music =

Cosmic music may refer to:

- Afro/Cosmic music, synthesizer-heavy and/or African-influenced dance music
- Krautrock, sometimes called "kosmische musick"
- Space music, a subgenre of new-age music

Cosmic Music may refer to:

- Cosmic Couriers, a German experimental/space-rock label
- Cosmic Music, a jazz album by John and Alice Coltrane
- Cosmic Music, a Pink Floyd bootleg recording
- Cosmic Music, a 1989 book by Joscelyn Godwin

== See also ==
- Space music (disambiguation)
