= The Bridge of Light (album) =

Live album by Apocalypse
- Released: 2008
- Genre: Progressive rock
- Label: Free Mind / Musea
- Producer: Apocalypse

Apocalypse chronology
Apocalypse Live in Rio (2007)	The Bridge of Light (2008)	Magic Spells (2010)

The Bridge of Light is an album by Apocalypse, recorded live in concert. The album is divided in two acts. Act I is composed by individual songs and Act II tells the story of a boy trying to find answers about himself in an abandoned park in the Christmas Day. Eloy Fritsch plays keyboards including analog synths and Hammond organs. His brother Ruy plays guitar. Singer Gustavo Demarchi also plays the flute. The guest violin player is Hique Gomez.

== Track listing ==
1. Next Revelation
2. Dreamer
3. Ocean Soul
4. Last Paradise
5. The Dance of Down
6. Meet Me
7. Wake Up Call...
8. ...To Madeleine
9. Escape
10. Welcome Outside
11. Meeting Me Earthcrubbs
12. Follow The Bridge
13. Not Like You

== Musicians ==
- Eloy Fritsch: electronic keyboards, Organ, Minimoog, vocals
- Ruy Fritsch: electric and acoustic guitars, vocals
- Chico Fasoli: drums, percussion, vocals
- Gustavo Demarchi: lead vocals, flute
- Magoo Wise: bass guitar
- Hique Gomez: violin, vocals
