= Dreams (Eloy Fritsch album) =

Studio album by Eloy Fritsch
- Released: 1996
- Genre: New-age, electronic, progressive rock
- Length: 53:57
- Producer: Eloy Fritsch

Eloy Fritsch chronology
Dreams (1996)	Behind the Walls of Imagination (1997)

Professional ratings
Review scores
Source	Rating
AllMusic	3/5 stars

Dreams is an album by Brazilian composer Eloy Fritsch.

AllMusic's Cesar Lanzarini said that Fritsch's debut is "a perfect example of how to combine an infinite quantity of timbres created in different synthesizers and use them as tools to explore human sensations".

== Track listing ==
1. "Space Odissey" – 3:47
2. "The Motions of Planets" – 3:33
3. "Saturn" – 3:46
4. "Pity" – 3:11
5. "Crystal" – 3:35
6. "Electronic Dreams" – 12:14
7. "Mystical Ocean" – 9:38
8. "The Hall of Imagination" – 3:21
9. "Firmament" – 3:34
10. "Lost Temple" – 3:46
11. "Progressive Concert" – 6:32
