= Bob Olsen =

American novelist

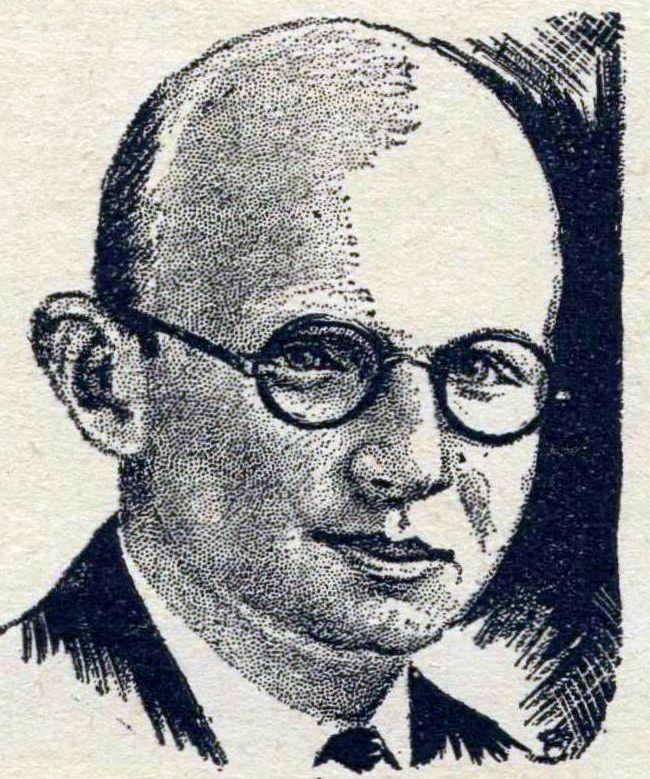
Bob Olsen c, 1929

Alfred Johannes Olsen (April 12, 1884 – May 20, 1956), better known under his pen name Bob Olsen, was an American science fiction writer.

== Biography ==
Olsen was the son of Norwegian immigrants and grew up in Providence, Rhode Island. He attended Brown University, and achieved a Phi Beta Kappa and a masters in science in 1908. He later met his wife, Thula Crismon (1896–1957) in Salt Lake City, Utah while teaching science. He had five children, but one died at birth. His first son and first child was Bob Gillham Olsen, named after his father's pen name born 1919, his first daughter and second child was Zora Louise Olsen born 1923, their second daughter and third child was Joyzelle Kaza Olsen born in 1929, and their fourth child and second son was Kenneth Crimson Olsen born 1937.

He moved to California and started the Olsen Advertising Agency, all the while writing stories for magazines like Amazing Stories. He built a home in Beverly Hills. Olsen often wrote humorous science fiction in Amazing Stories, from 1927 to 1936. He was one of the first writers to use the phrase "space marine". His large hobby granted him fame through the world of science fiction in his day, but that was not enough to support a family. Ray Bradbury, just a teenager at the time, visited Bob Olsen often for mentorship, friendship, as well as simply a sharing of ideas.

== Bibliography ==
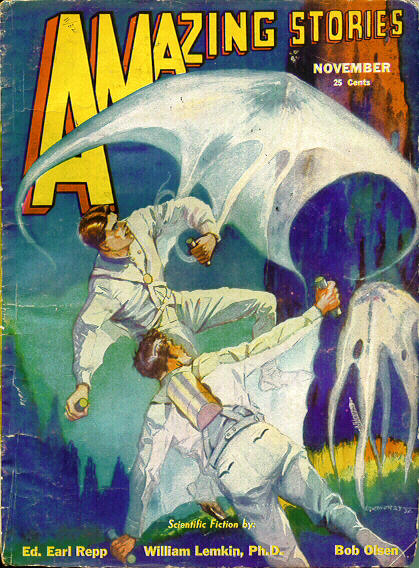
Olsen's novelette "Captain Brink of the Space Marines " was the cover story in the November 1932 Amazing Stories

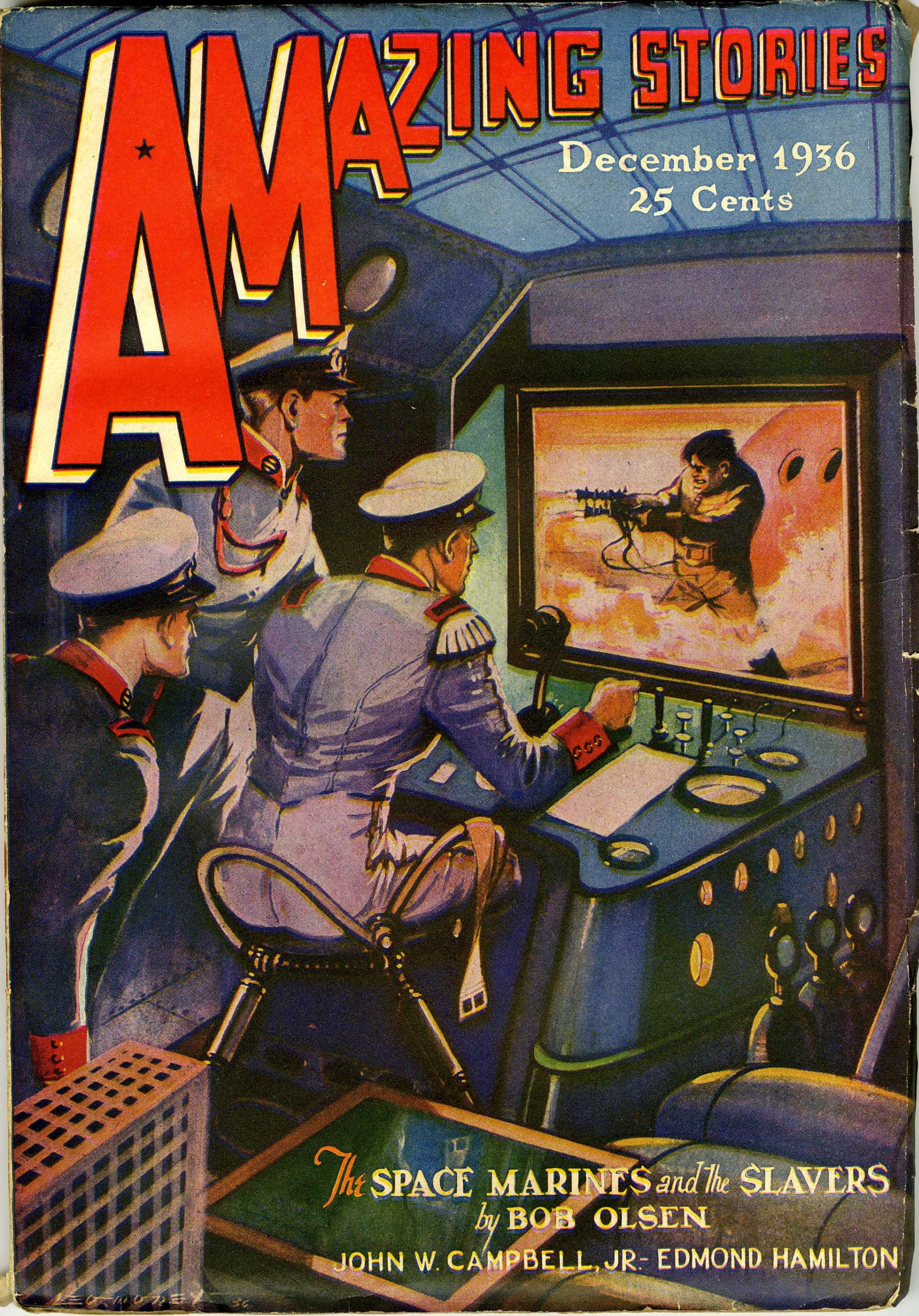
Olsen's novelette "The Space Marines and the Slavers" was the cover story in the December 1936 Amazing Stories

=== Short stories ===
- "The Four-Dimensional Roller-Press", Amazing Stories, June 1927
- "Four-Dimensional Surgery", Amazing Stories, February 1928
- "Four-Dimensional Robberies", Amazing Stories, May 1928
- "The Educated Pill", Amazing Stories, July 1928
- "Four Dimensional Transit", Amazing Stories Quarterly, Fall 1928
- "The Superperfect Bride", Amazing Stories, July 1929
- "Flight in 1999", Air Wonder Stories, September 1929
- "The Phantom Teleview", Science Wonder Stories, November 1929
- "Cosmic Trash", Science Wonder Stories, April 1930
- "The Man who Annexed the Moon", Amazing Stories, February 1931
- "The Master of Mystery", Amazing Stories, October 1931
- "Seven Sunstrokes", Amazing Stories, April 1932
- "The Ant with the Human Soul", Amazing Stories Quarterly, Spring/Summer 1932
- "The Purple Monsters", Amazing Stories, August 1932
- "Captain Brink of the Space Marines", Amazing Stories, November 1932
- "The Pool of Death", Amazing Stories, January 1933
- "The Crime Crusher", Amazing Stories, June 1933
- "The Four-Dimensional Escape", Amazing Stories, December 1933
- "Perils Among the Drivers", Amazing Stories, March 1934
- "The Four-Dimensional Auto-Parker", Amazing Stories, July 1934
- "Nœkken of Norway", Amazing Stories, November 1934
- "Six-Legged Gangsters", Amazing Stories, June 1935
- "The Isle of Juvenescence", Amazing Stories, June 1936
- "The Space Marines and the Slavers", Amazing Stories, December 1936
- "The Scourge of a Single Cell", Science Fiction, March 1940
- "Rhythm Rides the Rocket", Science Fiction, October 1940
- "Our Robot Maid", Future Fiction, November 1940

=== Poems ===
- "Transports of Love", Amazing Stories, June 1929
- "My Robot Son", Amazing Stories Quarterly, Fall 1931
- "In 1999", Amazing Stories, January 1934
- Untitled, Amazing Stories, July 1934
- "Who Deserves Credit?", Amazing Stories, February 1935
- "How Inventions Are Born", Amazing Stories, April 1935
- "Landscapes of Luna", Amazing Stories, October 1935

=== Other ===
- Cosmos: "Chapter 4: The Murderer from Mars", Science Fiction Digest, September 1933
- "Cigarette Characterization #1", Fantasy Magazine, September 1934
- "My Best Story", Fantasy Magazine, February 1935
- Rhythm Rides the Rocket, Columbia Publications, 1942
- "Wanted: A Definition for Science Fiction", Future Science Fiction, June 1957
