= Mythology (Eloy Fritsch album) =

Studio album by Eloy Fritsch
- Released: 2001
- Genre: Electronic music, progressive rock
- Length: 36:36
- Label: Musea/Dreaming and Rock Symphony
- Producer: Eloy Fritsch

Eloy Fritsch chronology
Cyberspace (2000)	Mythology (2001)	Atmosphere (2003)

Professional ratings
Review scores
Source	Rating
AllMusic	4.5/5 stars

Mythology is an album by new age artist Eloy Fritsch.

AllMusic's Cesar Lanzarini described the record as "a landmark in Fritsch's career".

== Track listing ==
1. "The Creation" – 2:59
2. "Inti" – 3:07
3. "Assur" – 3:45
4. "Curupira" – 4:04
5. "Aphrodite" – 2:57
6. "Shiva" – 3:01
7. "Isis" – 3:15
8. "Asgard" – 2:45
9. "Atlantis" – 5:55
10. "Excalibur" – 6:08
11. "Jupiter" – 4:00
12. "Kinich-Ahau" – 6:07
13. "Yang & Yin" – 3:29
14. "Quetzalcoatl" – 6:05
15. "Mermaids" – 4:35
