= Apocalypse (band) =

Brazilian rock band

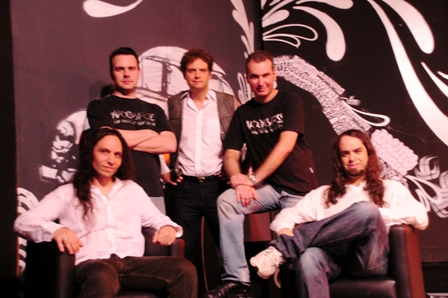
- Apocalypse in 2009

Background information
- Origin: Caxias do Sul Brazil
- Genres: Progressive rock, art rock, symphonic rock, psychedelic rock, neo-prog, hard rock
- Years active: 1983–present
- Labels: Musea, Rock Symphony, Free Mind, Atração, Acit
- Members: Eloy Fritsch; Ruy Fritsch; Gustavo Demarchi; Rainer Steiner; Daniel Motta
- Past members: Chico Fasoli; Adriano Menegazzo; Chico Casara; Magoo Wise; Guto Basso; Alberto Rasia Filho; Deco; Zezinho da Batera; Fábio Schneider; Rafael Schmitt; Carlos D'Elia
- Website: www.apocalypseband.com.br

Apocalypse is a progressive rock band from Brazil that plays symphonic rock with strong electronic keyboard orientation.

The lineup of Apocalypse consists of Eloy Fritsch (electronic keyboards), Ruy Fritsch (guitars), Daniel Motta (bass), Rainer Steiner (drums) and Gustavo Demarchi (lead vocal, flute, and acoustic guitar).

Apocalypse has been called "one of the all time biggest names on the Brazilian progressive rock scene."

== History ==
Apocalypse was born in 1983, in Caxias do Sul, Southern Brazil, founded by Eloy Fritsch and some school friends at the Colégio Nossa Senhora do Carmo who got together for a student music contest. After this first concert, guitar player Ruy Fritsch and drummer Chico Fasoli joined their ranks, playing with the band at the Festival 1º Ópera Rock. From the beginning, they made use of organ, synthesizers, classical vocals and created songs influenced by Uriah Heep, Yes, Pink Floyd, Led Zeppelin, Rush, Genesis and Queen. From 1984 to 1988, the line-up changed several times.

In 1992, the line-up stabilized with Eloy Fritsch (keyboards), Ruy Fritsch (guitar), Chico Fasoli (drums) and Chico Casara (bass, vocals). Apocalypse was now signed to rock label Musea. The album Perto do Amanhecer was released in France in 1995. The positive reviews from abroad started to arrive, which led to a rise in the band's popularity and another invitation from Musea, this time for the compilation "Le Melleur du Progressif Instrumental". With its baroque influences and interplay of minimoog and guitar solos, the chosen song was "Notre Dame".

In their following album, Aurora dos Sonhos, Apocalypse created several complex and long progressive rock tracks, such as "Do Outro Lado da Vida" and "Vindo das Estrelas". “Aurora dos Sonhos” was again released in France by Musea and was well received. In 1998, the band was invited to play at the Planeta Atlântida music festival in Southern Brazil.

After this show, they signed with Atração, a Brazilian label and released a CD entitled The Best of Apocalypse, with tracks from their French CDs. To promote this CD, they decided they should tour other parts of Brazil. In April, they were invited by the Rock Symphony label and travel to Rio de Janeiro to take part in the Rio ArtRock Festival third edition, playing together with English band Pendragon at the Teatro João Caetano. One year later, in 1999, they were invited to play in the US, at the long running progressive rock festival, Progday. This show was the first time a Brazilian band recorded a show in the US for a CD release.

The album Live in USA was released as a double CD with a CD-ROM track containing a videoclip and a booklet with many photographs from the US trip. The CD was released in 2000 and Rock Symphony took over the distribution.

The CD Refúgio was released in 2003 by the Rock Symphony and Musea labels with new tracks such as “Viagem no Tempo”, “Amazônia”, “Lembranças Eternas”, “Refúgio”, “Liberdade”, “Terceiro Milênio” and the epic “Cachoeira das Águas Douradas”. As a bonus, it also includes two songs from the “Live in USA” double CD. By 2004, Chico Casara (vocal and bass) left Apocalypse, and the other musicians decide to go on with a new line-up.

Singer Gustavo Demarchi and bass player Magoo Wise were invited to join the band. Apocalypse took on a new project: to record some of their old hits in English and also to start writing in the newly adopted language. In September 2005, Apocalypse was invited to another festival, this time the Rock Symphony For The Record festival at the Teatro Municipal de Niterói, Rio de Janeiro.

The band's concert, on September 8, was released on DVD through the Rock Symphony label together with Musea Record Company. After this show, the band made another appearance in Rio, in 2006, playing together with English band Uriah Heep at the Canecão as part of the Rock in Concert Brazil.

Released in Brazil in 2008 by Free Mind Records and in Europe and Asia by Musea Records, The Bridge Of Light won several awards as Best of 2008: "Best Album", "Best Cover", "Best Show" and "Best Keyboardist" to Eloy Fritsch. In early 2009, the band also received the trophy Vasco Prado in honor of its 25-year career and Eloy Fritsch received the "Azorean Music Award - Honorable Mention" for his contribution to the south Brazilian music scene.

In 2009, the band undertook two tours in promotion of The Bridge Of Light including shows in the states of São Paulo and Parana. In addition to touring, the band performed with frequency in Rio Grande do Sul, the band's home state. For the second consecutive year, the keyboardist and composer Eloy Fritsch was also dubbed as "Brazilian Best Rock Keyboardist" in 2009 by the Brazilian rock site Whiplash.

The National Grape Party in Caxias do Sul, south of Brazil was the first show of the new drummer of the band, Fábio Schneider. He joined the band in substitution of the old drummer, Chico Fasoli.

In 2011 the group released the 25th Anniversary Box Set. Unpublished work in the national progressive rock, the box brought a DVD of the concert recorded in September 2009 at the Hall of Acts of the Federal University of Rio Grande do Sul, the live CD Magic Spells bringing classic tunes of the band's career, a book written by the journalist and producer Eliton Tomasi telling the whole story of the band and, finally, the new Apocalypse studio album. In the same year Apocalypse promoted one important project in its career, the quintet released the concert Rock Sinfônico with Orchestra and Choral, September 11, at the UCS Theatre in the city of Caxias do Sul, south of Brazil.

In 2012 Apocalypse received the Açorianos Music Awards, honoring the contribution of Apocalypse to the music in the south of Brazil. The awards ceremony took place on May 9, 2012, at the São Pedro Theater, Porto Alegre, Brazil. The singer Gustavo Demarchi also received a trophy for creating the best artwork for the Apocalypse 25th Anniversary Box Set. In 2013, Apocalypse was the opening act for Yes in Porto Alegre, Brazil, during Yes World Tour playing the 3 albums The Yes Album, Close To The Edge and Going For The One.

== Members ==
Current

- Eloy Fritsch – keyboards, synthesizers, vocals
- Ruy Fritsch – guitars
- Gustavo Demarchi – vocals, flute, acoustic guitar
- Rainer Steiner – drums, percussion
- Daniel Motta – bass

Line-ups in eras
Years	Lineup	Albums
1983–1984	Zezinho da Batera – drums, percussion; Chico Casara – acoustic guitar, vocals; Gutto Basso – acoustic guitar and lead vocal; Eloy Fritsch – keyboards, synthesizers, bass
1984–1986	Chico Fasoli – drums; Alberto Rasia - percussion; Chico Casara – bass guitar, electric guitar, lead vocal; Adriano Menegazzo – electric guitar, vocals; Ruy Fritsch – electric guitar; Eloy Fritsch – keyboards, synthesizers, bass
1986–1987	Chico Fasoli – drums, percussion; Chico Casara – bass guitar, lead vocal; Adriano Menegazzo – guitar, vocals; Eloy Fritsch – keyboards, synthesizers, vocals
1988–1992	Chico Fasoli – drums, percussion; Chico Casara – bass guitar, lead vocal; Eloy Fritsch – keyboards, synthesizers, vocals	Apocalypse(1991)
1993–2003	Chico Fasoli – drums, percussion; Chico Casara – bass guitar, lead vocal; Eloy Fritsch – keyboards, synthesizers, vocals; Ruy Fritsch – guitar	Perto do Amanhecer (1995); Aurora dos Sonhos (1996); Lendas Encantadas (1997); The Best of Apocalypse (1998); Apocalypse Live in USA (2000); Refuge (2003)
2004–2009	Chico Fasoli – drums, percussion; Gustavo Demarchi – vocals, flute; Eloy Fritsch – keyboards, synthesizers, vocals; Ruy Fritsch – electric guitar, acoustic guitar, vocals; Magoo Wise - bass	Live in Rio (2006); Magic Spells (2006); The Bridge of Light (2008); Apocalypse 25th Anniversary Concert (2010)
2010–2011	Fabio Schneider – drums, percussion; Gustavo Demarchi – vocals, flute; Eloy Fritsch – keyboards, synthesizers, bass guitar, vocals; Ruy Fritsch – electric guitar, acoustic guitar, vocals	2012 Light Years from Home (2011)
2012	Fabio Schneider – drums, percussion; Gustavo Demarchi – vocals, flute; Eloy Fritsch – keyboards, synthesizers; Ruy Fritsch – electric guitar, acoustic guitar, vocals; Rafael Schmitt - bass
2013–present	Rainer Steiner – drums, percussion; Gustavo Demarchi – vocals, flute; Eloy Fritsch – keyboards, synthesizers, vocals; Ruy Fritsch – electric guitar, acoustic guitar, vocals; Carlos D'elia – bass guitar, vocals

== Discography ==
=== DVDs ===
- Apocalypse - Live in Rio (2007)
- Apocalypse - The 25th Anniversary Concert (2010)
- Apocalypse - The Bridge of Light (2013)

=== Studio albums ===
- Apocalypse (1991)
- Perto do Amanhecer (1995)
- Aurora dos Sonhos (1996)
- Lendas Encantadas (1997)
- Refúgio (2003)
- 2012 Light Years from Home (2011)

=== Compilations ===
- The Best of Apocalypse (1998)

=== Live albums ===
- Apocalypse Live in USA (2000)
- Apocalypse Live in Rio (2007)
- The Bridge of Light (2008)
- Magic Spells (2010)

=== Book ===
- Tomasi, Eliton. The Apocalypse Hystory. Evangraf Editora, Porto Alegre, 2011 (2011)

=== Box set ===
- Apocalypse - The 25th Anniversary BoxSet (2011)

=== Compilation appearances ===
- Circuito de Rock (1989) Track: "Só Você"
- Le Melleur du Progressif Instrumental (1996) Track: "Notre Dame"
- Rio Art Rock Festival (1999) Track: "Corta"
- ProgDay Encore (2001) Tracks: "Corta", "Jamais Retornarei", "Clássicos (Rock Version)"
- Margen - Music from the Edge Vol. 16 (2002)- Track: "Refúgio"
- Classic Rock Society - New Species 09 (2013) - Track: "New Sunrise"

=== Singles ===
- "Magic" (2004)
