= Joseph Schlossel =

American novelist

Joseph Schlossel (21 December 1902 – 1 December 1977) was a science fiction writer and pioneer of the space opera genre. E. F. Bleiler, in his bibliographic work Science-Fiction: The Early Years, described Schlossel's work as "crude and amateurish", but notes that it anticipated further developments. Despite his poor storytelling skills, he was credited by showing "tremendous inventiveness in his adventures, with intergalactic wars and invasions on an immense scale". Mike Ashley states that "Schlossel's writing was basic but his imagination and vision made him one of the more significant contributors to the early SF Magazines".

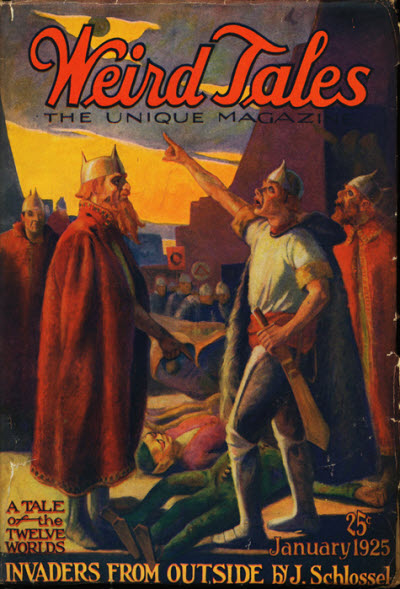
Schlossel's first published story, "Invaders from Outside", was the cover story for the January 1926 Weird Tales.

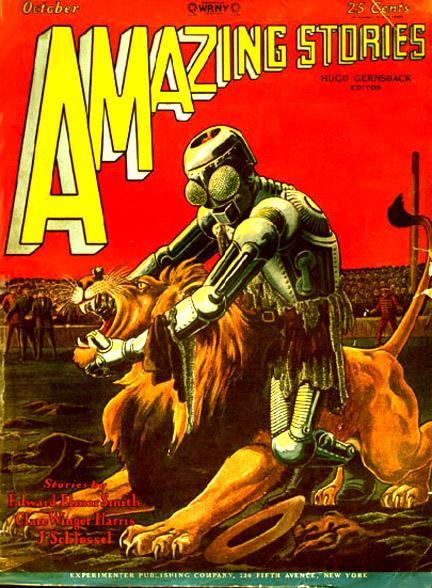
Schlossel's fifth published story, "To the Moon by Proxy", was cover-featured on the October 1928 Amazing Stories.

Schlossel was born in New York in 1902. He was raised in Toronto and became a tailor, his father's line of work. His first story was published in Weird Tales in 1925, where his next two stories appeared. Beginning in 1926, his remaining work was sold to Amazing Stories. After the Great Depression set in, he left his trade, took employment in metal plating, and stopped writing. He died in 1977.

His work usually carried the byline "J. Schlossel". None of his stories have appeared in book form, although two were reprinted in later sf magazines.

== Short fiction ==
- "Invaders from Outside" (1925)
- "Hurled into the Infinite" (1925)
- "A Message from Space" (1926)
- "The Second Swarm" (1928)
- "To the Moon by Proxy" (1928)
- "Extra-Galactic Invaders" (1931)
