= Space Music (album) =

Studio album by Eloy Fritsch
- Released: 1998
- Genre: Electronic music, new-age
- Length: 47:20
- Label: Dreaming / Musea
- Producer: Eloy Fritsch

Eloy Fritsch chronology
Behind the Walls of Imagination (1997)	Space Music (1998)	Cyberspace (2000)

Professional ratings
Review scores
Source	Rating
AllMusic	3/5 stars

Space Music is the third album of Brazilian composer Eloy Fritsch.

AllMusic's Cesar Lanzarini noted the similarities to other keyboard players such as Yanni, Isao Tomita and Jan Hammer, and said that Fritsch's music "captures emotional experience and transforms it through upbeat and melodic compositions".

== Track listing ==
1. "Beyond the Galaxy" – 2:51
2. "Time to Fly – Part One" – 3:34
3. "Dawn over the Planet" – 7:08
4. "Gate to Infinity" – 4:21
5. "Starlight" – 4:22
6. "Sonic Attack" – 8:33
7. "Microcosmos" – 4:11
8. "Dances with Dolphins" – 4:18
9. "Journey to the Unknown" – 4:00
10. "Time to Fly – Part Two" – 3:51
