= Hans Waldemar Wessolowski =

German-American illustrator (1894–1948)

- Born: August 19, 1894; Graudenz, German Empire
- Died: May 12, 1948 (aged 53); Norwalk, Connecticut
- Style: Science fiction, pulp fiction

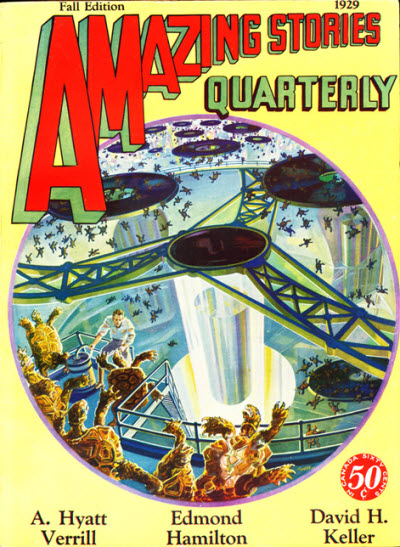
Amazing Stories Quarterly, Fall 1929, cover art by Wesso

Hans Waldemar Wessolowski (August 19, 1894 – May 12, 1948) was a German-American artist best known under the pseudonym "Wesso" for his many cover illustrations for pulp magazines in the 1930s and early 1940s.

== Early life ==
Hans Waldemar Wessolowski was born August 19, 1894, in the city of Graudenz in the German Empire (now part of Poland). He had a brother and a sister. He studied art at the Royal School of Art in Berlin, worked as a commercial artist, and found his first permanent position at the satire magazine Simplicissimus. By early 1914, he was living in Hamburg.

Blind in one eye, Wessolowski was rejected for military service. Anxious to see the world, he joined the German merchant navy, taking a job as a crew member on the SS Fürst Bismarck in May 1914. Dissatisfied with the hard work required, he jumped ship in New Orleans, Louisiana, in June 1914. (Note: From 1906 until the outbreak of World War I in August 1914, the Fürst Bismarck served as a passenger liner operating between Hamburg and Veracruz, Mexico, usually stopping in Havana, Cuba. On February 18, 1913, General Victoriano Huerta seized power in a coup d'état in Mexico. The new regime was recognized by the German Empire, which wished to support it with guns and ammunition. U.S. President Woodrow Wilson invoked the Monroe Doctrine and attempted to bar all German arms shipments to Mexico. The U.S. could not, however, stop the private sale of American arms to the Huerta regime. The surprisingly passengerless Fürst Bismarck unexpectedly arrived in New Orleans on June 7, 1914. American authorities suspected the ship was picking up a private arms shipment, but an inspection of loading cargo revealed only miscellaneous merchandise. She remained under surveillance until she departed for Veracruz on June 10.) He became a naturalized American citizen a year later.

== Career ==
=== Commercial artist and entry into pulps ===
Wessolowski took up residence in Kansas City, Missouri. He became a commercial artist in 1916, working for the Ferry Hanly Advertising Company as well as for companies such as the Union Bank Note Company, the Burger-Braid Engraving Company. When the United States entered World War I, he registered for military service but was never drafted.

By 1927, Wessolowski was living in New York City. He received his first freelance commission as an illustrator in December of that year. His work accompanied the short story "The Apple Tree Sage" by Manuel Komroff in McClure's magazine. He received three more commissions from McClure's, and in the summer of 1928 began working for Clayton Magazines, a major publisher of pulp magazines. His first work for Clayton appeared on the cover of Clues: A Magazine of Detective Stories in July 1928. He provided covers for Air Adventures, The Danger Trail, and Three Star Magazine in October, and added work for Adventure Tails, Brief Stories, Complete Detective Novel Magazine, World Stories, and All Star Detective Stories over the next 18 months.

Although he worked primarily for science fiction and fantasy magazines after 1929, Wesso occasionally did illustrations for other Clayton magazines. For example, he drew an Art Deco style cover for the January 1934 issue of Motor Magazine.

=== Science fiction and fantasy work ===
He got his first job as a science fiction and fantasy pulp cover artist when editor T. O'Conor Sloane hired him in September 1929 to draw the cover for Amazing Stories. Wesso had never heard of science fiction before. Late in 1929, editor Harry Bates hired him to draw the cover for the first issue of Astounding Stories, which had a cover date of January 1930. He drew the covers for Astounding Stories every month until Howard V. Brown took over cover art duties in October 1933. He created 34 covers for the magazine.

Wessolowski also drew covers for another Clayton Magazine effort, Strange Tales beginning in September 1931. He also drew illustrations for Weird Tales magazine in August 1931.

His covers were brightly colored and eye-catching. He was particularly proficient at drawing monsters, and less so at depicting advanced technology. His human figures are distinctive, thin, and sharp-featured. They invariably show strained muscles and extended limbs. The proportions of his humans are oddly distorted, with sunken chests, peculiarly large thigh muscles, and elongated limbs. As Frank R. Paul was the best and primary illustrator for science fiction and fantasy magazines published by Experimenter Publishing and Ziff Davis, Wesso became the key artist for similar pulps issued by Clayton Magazines. (Note: In financial difficulty due to the Great Depression, Clayton ceased publication in October 1932; issues cover dated March 1933 were the last to be sold. Clayton Magazines declared bankruptcy in April 1930 and sold its magazine titles. T.R. Foley purchased Astounding Stories and Clues for $100; Foley resold them in August to Street & Smith, a well-established publisher.) He spent anywhere from two days to a week on a cover, occasionally using toys as models for his work. His work was often lauded by readers.

He signed his work "Wesso", and it is this name that is most commonly cited when his art is given credit.

Wesso earned a good income from his pulp work. Along with Frank R. Paul, Howard V. Brown, and Leo Morey, he was considered one of the top four early pulp artists.

Wesso ceased to work for pulps for a time after the collapse of Clayton Magazines in 1933, only returning in 1937 when he drew the cover for the June 1937 Astounding Stories (now owned and published by Street & Smith) and the August 1937 cover of Thrilling Wonder Stories (published by Better Publications).

Editor Hugo Gernsback tried to hire Wesso as a cover artist for Amazing Stories, but the artist refused to accept the low fee Gernsback offered.

Better Publications began issuing a new pulp magazine, Startling Stories, in January 1939. Wesso drew illustrations for Edmund Hamilton's novel The Prisoner of Mars in the May 1939 issue. (Note: Startling usually published a full novel, accompanied by one or two short stories, in each issue.) The company began publication of Captain Future magazine in winter 1940 (street date December 1939). Each issue contained a full-length novel featuring the science super hero, Curtis Newton a.k.a. Captain Future. Wessolowski drew illustrations for the first 15 issues. (Note: Only 17 issues appeared.)

Throughout his pulp magazine career, Hans Wessolowski continued to work as a freelance commercial artist. In 1940, Wesso joined the New York Daily News as a staff artist. His output for sci fi and fantasy pulps dropped dramatically: Between 1937 and 1942, he drew only six covers for Astounding, three for Thrilling Wonder Stories, and one for Marvel Science Fiction. His cover for Astonishing Stories in March 1942 was his last sci fi cover. (Note: Astonishing Stories was published by Popular Publications, and Marvel Science Stories was published at that time by Postal Publications.) He ceased working for pulp magazines after 1942, except for the occasional commission.

== Private life ==
Hans Wessolowski married Minnie Isabella Ross on May 18, 1918. They lived in Kansas City until at least 1925, then resided in New York City. Some time before 1940, they moved to Fairfield, Connecticut. Minnie Ross returned to Kansas City some time after his death, and died in October 1972.

== Death ==
Hans Wessolowski died at the age of 53 at Norwalk Hospital in Norwalk, Connecticut, on May 12, 1948. His wife survived him; they had no children.

== Bibliography ==
- Ashley, Michael (2000). The History of the Science-Fiction Magazine. Volume 1: The Time Machines: The Story of the Science-Fiction Pulp Magazines From the Beginning to 1950. Liverpool, UK: Liverpool University Press. ISBN 9780853238553.
- Ashley, Michael; Lowndes, Robert A.W. (2004). The Gernsback Days: A Study of the Evolution of Modern Science Fiction From 1911 to 1936. Holicong, Pa.: Wildside Press. ISBN 9780809510559.
- Bleiler, E.F.; Bleiler, Richard (1998). Science-Fiction: The Gernsback Years: A Complete Coverage of the Genre Magazines From 1926 Through 1936. Kent, Ohio: Kent State University Press. ISBN 9780873386043.
- Carper, Steve (2019). Robots in American Popular Culture. Jefferson, N.C.: McFarland & Company. ISBN 9781476670416.
- del Rey, Lester (2021). The World of Science Fiction, 1926–1976: The History of a Subculture. Abingdon, Oxfordshire: Routledge. ISBN 9780367748395.
- Derleth, August; Lovecraft, H.P. (2008). Joshi, S.T.; Schultz, David E. (eds.). Essential Solitude: The Letters of H.P. Lovecraft and August Derleth. New York: Hippocampus Press. ISBN 9781614980605.
- Fiks, Norbert (March 2021). "Ein Stern am Pulp-Himmel: Hans Waldemar Wessolowski". Phantastisch! (in German). No. 83. pp. 42–46. ISBN 978-3-86402-800-7.
- Gombert, Richard W. (2009). World Wrecker: An Annotated Bibliography of Edmond Hamilton. San Bernardino, Calif.: Borgo Press. ISBN 9781434457264.
- Haining, Peter (2000). The Classic Era of American Pulp Magazines. Chicago: Chicago Review Press. ISBN 9781556523892.
- Hulse, Ed (2009). The Blood 'n' Thunder Guide to Collecting Pulps. Morris Plains, N.J.: Murania Press. ISBN 9780979595509.
- Käther, Matthias (2021). "Hommage an Hans Wessolowski (1894-1948)". In Käther, Matthias (ed.). Fantastic Pulp 2 (in German). Windeck, Germany: BLITZ-Verlag. ISBN 9783957196132.
- Rothe, Klaus (1986). Deutsche Ozean-Passagierschiffe 1896 bis 1918. Bibliothek der Schiffstypen (in German). Berlin: VEB Verlag für Verkehrswesen. ISBN 9783921564806.
- Steele, Allen (2018). Captain Future in Love. Hillsborough, N.H.: Experimenter Publishing Co. ISBN 9781704073767.
