= Alpheus Hyatt Verrill =

American novelist

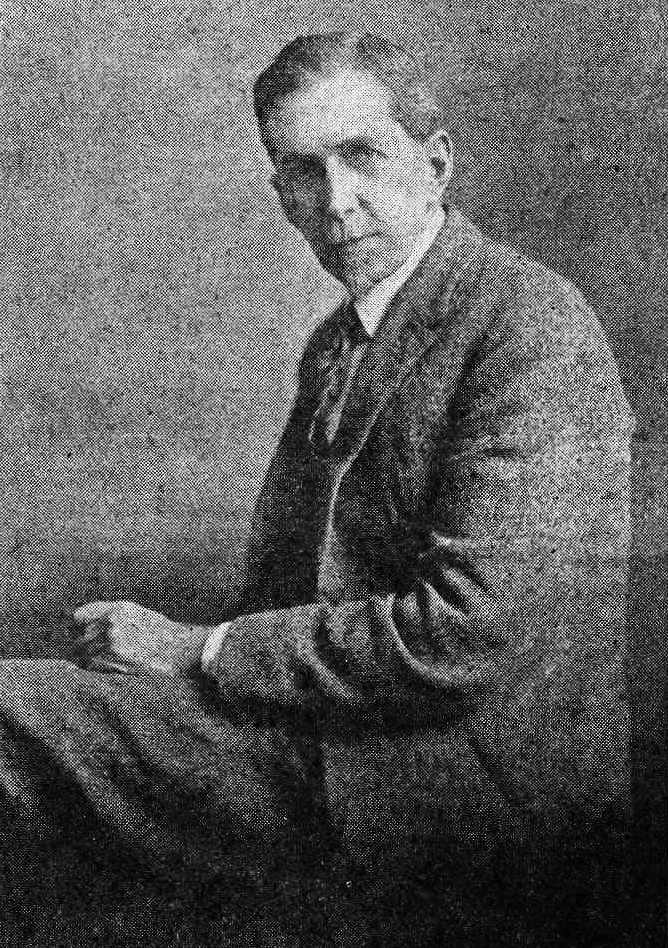
Hyatt Verrill c. 1927.

Alpheus Hyatt Verrill, known as Hyatt Verrill, (23 July 1871 – 14 November 1954) was an American zoologist, explorer, inventor, illustrator and writer. He was the son of Addison Emery Verrill, the first professor of zoology at Yale University.

He authored numerous works on natural history and science fiction.

== Biography ==
Hyatt Verrill was born at New Haven, Connecticut.

He wrote on a wide variety of topics, including natural history, travel, radio and whaling. He participated in a number of archaeological expeditions to the West Indies, South, and Central America. He travelled extensively throughout the West Indies, and all of the Americas, North, Central and South. Theodore Roosevelt stated: "It was my friend Verrill here, who really put the West Indies on the map.”

During 1896, he served as natural history editor of Webster's International Dictionary, and he illustrated many of his own writings as well. In 1902, Verrill invented the autochrome process of natural-color photography.

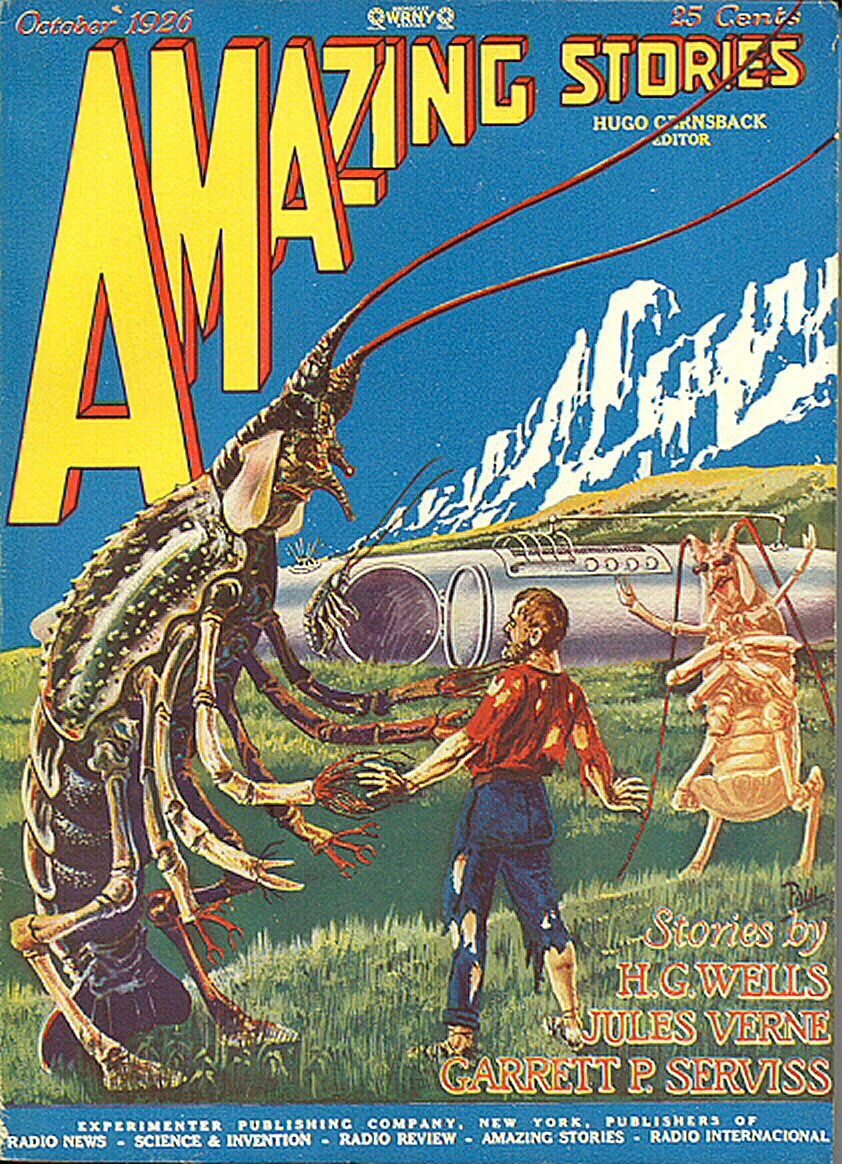
The October 1926 Amazing Stories cover-featured the first installment of Verrill's "Beyond the Pole".

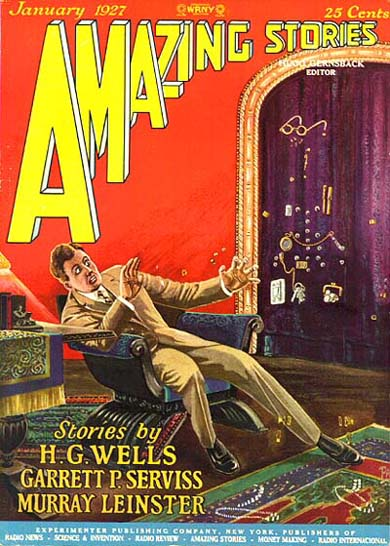
Verrill's novelette "The Man Who Could Vanish" took the cover of the January 1927 Amazing Stories.

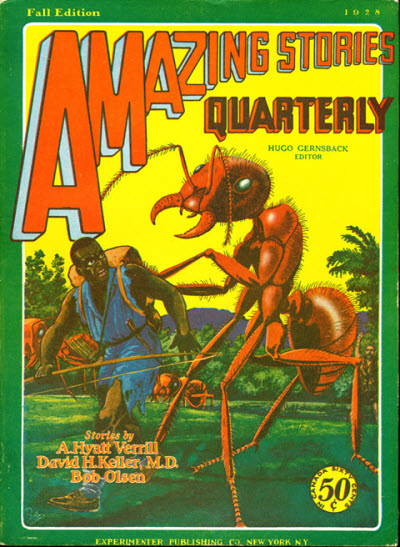
Verrill's novella "The World of the Giant Ants" was the cover story for the Fall 1928 Amazing Stories Quarterly.

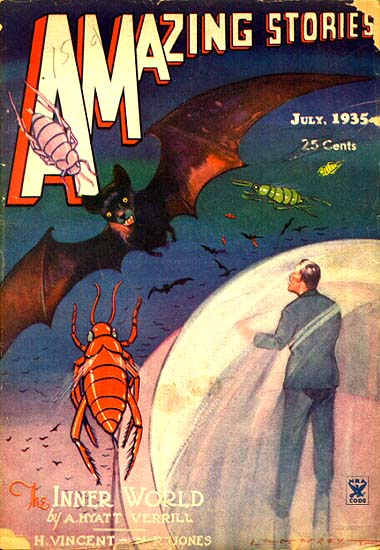
Another installment of a Verrill serial,The Inner World, took the cover of the July 1935 Amazing Stories.

Among his writings are many science fiction works including twenty six published in Amazing Stories pulp magazines. Upon his death, P. Schuyler Miller noted that Verrill "was one of the most prolific and successful writers of our time," with 115 books to his credit as well as "articles in innumerable newspapers." Everett F. Bleiler described Verrill's "lost race" stories as "more literate than most of their competition, but stodgy."

When the Moon Ran Wild (1962) was published posthumously using the name Ray Ainsbury.

== Reception ==
Verill's books were praised for their entertaining writing style but were criticized by biologist Joel Hedgpeth for containing "outrageous fabrications" to appeal to younger readers. Geneticist H. Bentley Glass wrote that Verill had written a number of entertaining works but his Strange Prehistoric Animals and Their Stories was riddled with errors and what passed as fact in the book was "hardly distinguishable" from fiction.

Lionel Walford, a marine biologist, wrote in a review for Verrill's Wonder Creatures of the Sea that the literary quality is "nullified by its lack of scientific dependability".

Other reviews were entirely positive. For example, his Harper's Book for Young Naturalists was described as factually reliable and a "valuable hand-book for the library of home or school".

== Bibliography ==
=== Non-fiction ===
- A-B-C of Automobile Driving (1916)
- Along New England Shores (1936)
- America's Ancient Civilizations (with Ruth Verrill) (1953)
- The Book of Camping (1917)
- The Book of the West Indies (1917, 1919)
- The Book of the Sailboat: How to rig, sail and handle small boats (1916)
- The Boy Collector's Handbook (1915)
- The Boy's Book of Buccaneeers (1927)
- The Boy's Book of Whalers (1927)
- Cuba Past and Present (1928)
- Foods America Gave the World (1945)
- Getting Together with Latin America (1918)
- Great conquerors of South and Central America (1943)
- Harper's Aircraft Book (1913)
- Harper's Book for Young Gardeners (1914)
- Harper's Book for Young Naturalists
- Harper's Gasoline Engine Book (1914)
- Harper's Wireless Book (1913)
- The Heart of Old New England (1936)
- The Home Radio: How to Use and Make It (1922)
- The Incas' Treasure Cove (1932)
- The Inquisition (1931)
- Islands and Their Mysteries
- Islands of Spice and Palm (1915)
- Jamaica of Today (1931)
- Verrill, Alpheus Hyatt (1917). Knots, Splices and Rope Work. Norman W. Henley Publishing.
- Lost Treasure: True Tales of Hidden Hoards (1930)
- Minerals, Metals and Gems (1939)
- My Jungle Trails (1937, 1941)
- The Ocean and Its Mysteries (1917)
- Perfumes and Spices (1940)
- Precious Stones and Their Stories
- The Real Story of the Whaler: Whaling Past and Present (1916)
- Rivers and Their Mysteries
- Romantic and Historic Virginia (1935)
- Romantic and Historic Florida (1935)
- Secret Treasure: Hidden Riches of the British Isles (1931)
- Shell Collector's Handbook (1950)
- Strange Animals and Their Stories (1939)
- Strange Birds and Their Stories (1938)
- Strange Creatures of the Sea (1955, 1959)
- Strange Customs, Manners and Beliefs (1946, 1969)
- Strange Fish and Their Stories (1938, 1948)
- Strange Insects and Their Stories (1938)
- Strange Monsters and Their Stories
- Strange Prehistoric Animals and Their Stories (1948)
- Strange Reptiles and Their Stories (1937)
- Strange Sea Shells and Their Stories (1950 [but listed in the 1938 edition of "Strange Birds"])
- The Strange Story of Our Earth: A Panorama of the Growth of Our Planet as Revealed by the Sciences of Geology and Paleontology (1962)
- They Found Gold; True Stories of Successful Treasure Hunts
- Thirty Years in the Jungle (1929)
- Under Peruvian Skies (1930?)
- West Indies of Today (1931, 1937)
- Wonder Creatures of the Sea (1940)
- Wonder Plants and Plant Wonders (1939)
- The Young Collector's Handbook (1948)
- Never a Dull Moment: The Autobiography of A. Hyatt Verill (2008)

=== Fiction ===
- Beyond the Pole, Amazing Stories (October 1926)
- The Man Who Could Vanish, Amazing Stories (January 1927)
- Plague of the Living Dead, Amazing Stories (April 1927)
- The Voice from the Inner World (1927)
- The World of the Giant Ants, Amazing Stories Quarterly (Fall 1928) reprinted by Armchair Fiction
- Into the Green Prism, Amazing Stories (1929) reprinted by Armchair Fiction
  - Beyond the Green Prism, Amazing Stories (1930) reprinted by Armchair Fiction
- The Bridge of Light, Amazing Stories Quarterly (Fall 1929)
- The Inner World, Amazing Stories (July 1935)
- When the Moon Ran Wild (1962)
