= Eloy Fritsch =

Brazilian electronic musician (born 1968)

- Born: 1968 (age 57–58)
- Origin: Brazil
- Genres: Electronic music, new-age music, progressive rock, instrumental music, space music
- Occupation: Musician/composer
- Instruments: Electronic Keyboards, Synthesizer, Organ, Piano, Percussion, Sampler, Electronics and Computer.
- Years active: 1983–present
- Labels: Musea, Rock Symphony, Atração, Groove Unlimited
- Website: www.ef.mus.br

Eloy Fernando Fritsch (born 1968) is an electronic musician, keyboard player and main composer of Brazilian progressive rock band Apocalypse. As a solo artist he creates cosmic new-age music.

== History ==
In 1983 Fritsch formed progressive rock band Apocalypse. They are considered pivotal in the development of progressive rock in Southern Brazil.

In 1992, he moved to Porto Alegre and began his solo project composing electronic music. His first official solo album was Dreams, recorded in 1994 and 1995. During 1997, he released his second solo album, Behind the Walls of Imagination, which showcases his skills with various electronic and acoustic keyboard instruments. In the mid-1990s, Fritsch secured a recording contract with French label Musea. His third album for them, Space Music, was released in 1998.

The composer reveals his sci-fi style with Cyberspace. In this album Fritsch offers 1970s-inspired keyboard symphonic/electronic progressive instrumental music. Fritsch performs electronic music that evolves between Vangelis' ambient and impressionist electronic, and the synthesized progressive rock of masters such as Rick Wakeman. Nevertheless, Fritsch has found his own style within melodic electronic music framework. The compositions are very melodic and emotive, with multi-layered instrumental textures/voicings and solidly coherent arrangements.

Fritsch has earned a PhD in computer music, and has served as a teacher of electronic music at the Federal University of Rio Grande do Sul (UFRGS). During 1999, Fritsch created the Electronic Music Center in the Institute of Arts at UFRGS.

In parallel with his work as keyboard player of the group Apocalypse and his academic activity, Fritsch releases music as a solo musician (through the Musea and Rock Symphony labels), such as the album Mythology, a large variety of original musical works in which he brings to maturity the use of synthesizers to compose melodic electronic music. This ambitious work uses the whole panel of his electronic sounds to depict fifteen tracks exclusively dedicated to the different gods worshiped in the past. Different cultures, such as Brazilian, Mesopotamian, Hindu, Amerindian, Inca, African, Greek, Egyptian, Scandinavian, Roman and Chinese, are outlined in the Mythology album by an instrumental composition, thanks to his panoply of keyboards including a Roland System 700 modular synthesizer.

Eloy Fritsch's love of the sky inspired him to compose the electronic suite Atmosphere (2003). Once again the composer reveals his ecological convictions: he presently defends the virtues of the gas envelope that allow everyone to live on Earth: the Atmosphere.

Landscapes (2005) was Fritsch's next work to emerge on disc.

In 2007 Eloy Fritsch wrote the book "Electronic Music" that was released in 2008 during the Book Fair in Porto Alegre. The book is accompanied by a DVD containing the electroacoustic compositions Synapse 5.1, Synthetic Horizon, Public Market, Indian Sampler, Mystery and Silicon Child created during his research in Electronic Music Center at Federal University of Rio Grande do Sul, Brazil. Eloy Fritsch received the Açorianos Music Awards. The awards ceremony happened on 28 April 2008, Tuesday night at the São Pedro Theater, Porto Alegre, Brazil. The Açorianos Music Awards honor the best albums, musicians and contributions to the music in South o Brazil. The ceremony was broadcast on television and event production presented a short film about the music and artistic works of the composer.

In 2009 Eloy Fritsch played keyboards in several concerts with the Apocalypse. He also released the album The Garden of Emotions. Musea company distributed the CD in Europe. The recorded company wrote the following lines about the album: "The ninth album The Garden of Emotions presents symphonic themes with choirs, analog and digital synthesizers dominating. Fans of classic VANGELIS, Jean-Michel JARRE and Rick WAKEMAN works will enjoy this. Some of the more solemn themes remind Isao TOMITA. "Lumine Solis" is one of the best compositions and a choir-laden track. "Solar Energy" introduces a spacier atmosphere, with phasing pads and Berlin School sequences. This is pure electronic music and a very good one, with all sorts of really fat analog timbres. "Beyond The Mountains" is a very cinematic and return to the classically inspired structures, with an extra ethnic elements. "Electric Light" is synthetic and even KRAFTWERK-like, with insisting sequences, vocoders and a simple repeating melodic theme. Flutes, marimba sound and percussion welcome the coming of "Savage" before a melodic synthesizers theme appears. "Space Station" is another foray into a purely synthetic world and you could also draw a comparison with Jean-Michel JARRE's "Chronologie". "The Canyon of Hope" finishes this album with flowing synthesizers, symphonic textures and a reflective electric piano".

In the same year Fritsch was also honored on the Journey of Literature event in the Passo Fundo city, Brazil. The composer received the trophy Vasco Prado.

In 2010 Fritsch worked on two major projects: In the production of The Apocalypse 25th Anniversary Box Set (2 CDs, 1 DVD and the book about the Apocalypse Hystory) and the MCT Project – Music, Science and Technology funded by the Brazilian government. Fritsch has created the Brazilian Virtual Museum of Synthesizer and a documentary film about electronic music to be distributed to schools and music teachers. He also created an exhibition of electronic music at the museum of the university.

In 2011 Eloy Fritsch perform in South of Brazil with Apocalypse, Orchestra and Choral during the Symphonic Rock Concert and the group received the Açorianos Music Awards. The awards ceremony happened on 9 May 2012, Wednesday night at the São Pedro Theater, Porto Alegre, Brazil. The Açorianos Music Awards honor contribution of the Apocalypse group to the music in South of Brazil.

The tenth Eloy Fritsch CD brings Exogenesis Suite in four movements inspired by the genesis of the universe. In addition to this suite the CD contains more eight individual tracks. Joining the symphonic and electronic, but without forgetting the ethnic instruments and the voices, the composer of new-age music uses high technology in the service of emotions to create compositions. The CD cover and booklet images were created by European artists specializing in science fiction illustrations Maciej Rebisz and Mirek Drozd and refer to the creation of the cosmos and the existence of other life forms.

== Selected discography ==
=== With Apocalypse ===
- 1991 – Apocalypse
- 1995 – Perto do Amanhecer
- 1996 – Aurora dos Sonhos
- 1997 – Lendas Encantadas
- 1998 – The Best of Apocalypse (Compilation)
- 2001 – Live in USA (Live)
- 2003 – Refugio
- 2004 – Magic
- 2006 – Apocalypse Live in Rio
- 2006 – DVD Apocalypse Live in Rio
- 2006 – The Bridge of Light
- 2006 – DVD The 25th Anniversary Concert
- 2010 – Magic Spells
- 2011 – 2012 Light Years from Home
- 2011 – The 25th Anniversary Box Set
- 2013 – DVD The Bridge of Light

=== Solo works ===
- 1996 – Dreams
- 1997 – Behind the Walls of Imagination
- 1998 – Space Music
- 2000 – Cyberspace
- 2001 – Mythology
- 2003 – Atmosphere – Electronic Suite
- 2005 – Landscapes
- 2006 – Past and Future Sounds – 1996-2006
- 2009 – The Garden of Emotions
- 2012 – Exogenesis
- 2014 – Spiritual Energy
- 2017 – Sailing to the Edge
- 2019 – Journey to the Future
- 2020 – Moment in Paradise
- 2021 – Cosmic Light
- 2023 – Epic Synthesizer Music Vol.1
- 2023 – Epic Synthesizer Music Vol.2

=== Compilations featuring Eloy Fritsch ===
- 1997 – Planeta Nova Era Vol. 7 Track: Lake of Peace Movement 1 and 2
- 1999 – Planeta Nova Era Vol. 13 Track: Cosmic Winds
- 1999 – Planeta Nova Era Vol. 14 Track: Starlight
- 2002 – Margen – Music from the Edge Vol. 6 – Track: Ionosphere
- 2005 – Edition #5 Track: The Garden of Emotions Suite
- 2006 – Brasil Instrumental 2006 Track: The Garden of Emotions Suite
- 2006 – Compact Mellotron 34 Track: Andromeda
- 2006 – Edition #13 Track: Shiva
- 2006 – Edition #14 Track: Atlantis
- 2006 – Edition #15 Track: Andromeda
- 2009 – Brazilian Electroacoustic Music Compilation Track: Synthetic Horizon
- 2012 – Schwingungen Radio auf CD – Edition Nr.210 11/12. Track: Moonwalk
- 2019 – Schwingungen Radio auf CD – Edition Nr.290 07/19. Track: Mermaids Island
- 2021 – Schwingungen Radio auf CD – Edition Nr.308 01/21. Track: Spacetime

== Keyboards used by Fritsch ==
Throughout his albums Fritsch uses several instruments. Some of these are:

- Minimoog
- Roland JD-800
- Roland JP-8000
- Roland JP-8080
- Roland Juno-106
- Roland JX-3P
- Roland System 700
- Roland AX-1
- Roland VK-8
- Casio CZ-5000
- Casio AZ-1
- Korg MS-10
- Korg MS-20
- Korg 01/W
- Korg M1
- Korg Triton
- Korg Polysix
- Korg Delta
- Korg MS2000R
- Yamaha SY77
- Yamaha DX-21
- Clavia Nord Modular
- Kurzweil K-2600
- Ensoniq MR76
- Digitech Vocalist
- AKAI S-5000
- Tokai Tx5-DS Plus
- Labolida Nano1
- M-audio Piano Pro Keys 88
- Korg Oasys
- Korg Triton Extreme
- Korg Kronos
- Roland Sysytem-8
- Roland Jupiter-80
- Behringer DeepMind12
- Roland Gaia
- Roland FA-06
- Roland FA-08

== See also ==
- Apocalypse
- List of ambient music artists
