= Philcon =

Science fiction convention in New Jersey, US

Coordinates: 39°55′33″N 75°3′11″W

Philadelphia Science Fiction Conference
- Status: Active
- Genre: Science fiction
- Venue: Doubletree by Hilton Hotel
- Location: Cherry Hill, New Jersey
- Country: United States
- Inaugurated: 1936
- Attendance: About 800 in 2013
- Organizer: Philadelphia Science Fiction Society
- Website: philcon.org

Philcon, also known as the "Philadelphia Science Fiction Conference", is an annual three-day science fiction convention held at the Doubletree by Hilton Hotel in Cherry Hill, New Jersey (formerly the Crowne Plaza Hotel). The convention is run by the Philadelphia Science Fiction Society (PSFS). The 1936 Philcon is claimed to be the world's first science fiction convention.

== History ==
On October 22, 1936, a half dozen fans came down from New York by train for the first intercity meeting of fans ever held. A picture taken of the group at Independence Hall has appeared in a number of the histories of science fiction fandom. They held a business meeting at the house of Philadelphia fan Milton A. Rothman, electing Rothman as chair and New Yorker Frederik Pohl as Secretary. Since Philadelphia had been the site of the 1936 Democratic and Republican National Conventions, they declared themselves the Philadelphia Science Fiction Convention. Part of the group went to John Baltadonis' home to examine his art collection and the printing press used to publish the PSFS newsletter. At Rothman's house, the group talked about science fiction and played craps. On the way back to the train station, some of the attendees sang early filk songs. One of the attendees, John B. Michel published an account of the day, the first convention report, in a New York fanzine:

Nine people attended the first Philcon in 1936. They were Ossie Train, Donald A. Wollheim, Milton A. Rothman, Frederik Pohl, John B. Michel, Will Sykora, David Kyle, Robert A. Madle, and John Baltadonis. Pohl excluded Herbert Goudket, who took the picture shown. Others are thought to have attended, but they are not shown in the picture.

Some fan historians claim that the 1936 Philadelphia Science Fiction Conference, a.k.a. Philcon, was the first science fiction convention ever held. Others, such as Fred Patten and Rob Hansen, make this claim for the January 1937 event in Leeds, England, organized by the Leeds Science Fiction League, which was specifically organised as a conference, with a program and speakers. Out of this came the first incarnation of the British Science Fiction Association.

Philcon in 2020 held a virtual convention due to the COVID-19 pandemic.

=== Philcon Worldcons ===
The World Science Fiction Convention, or Worldcon, has been held in Philadelphia three times:

- The 5th World Science Fiction Convention, called Philcon I, was held in 1947.
- The 11th World Science Fiction Convention, called Philcon II, was held in 1953.
- The 59th World Science Fiction Convention, called the Millennium Philcon, was held in 2001.
