= Astonishing Stories =

US pulp science fiction magazine

Astonishing Stories was an American pulp science fiction magazine, published by Popular Publications between 1940 and 1943. It was founded under Popular's "Fictioneers" imprint, which paid lower rates than Popular's other magazines. The magazine's first editor was Frederik Pohl, who also edited a companion publication, Super Science Stories. After nine issues Pohl was replaced by Alden H. Norton, who subsequently rehired Pohl as an assistant. The budget for Astonishing was very low, which made it difficult to acquire good fiction, but through his membership in the Futurians, a group of young science fiction fans and aspiring writers, Pohl was able to find material to fill the early issues. The magazine was successful, and Pohl was able to increase his pay rates slightly within a year. He managed to obtain stories by writers who subsequently became very well known, such as Isaac Asimov and Robert Heinlein. After Pohl entered the army in early 1943, wartime paper shortages led Popular to cease publication of Astonishing. The final issue was dated April of that year.

The magazine was never regarded as one of the leading titles of the genre, but despite the low budget it published some well-received material. Science fiction critic Peter Nicholls comments that "its stories were surprisingly good considering how little was paid for them", and this view has been echoed by other historians of the field.

== Publication history ==
Although science fiction had been published before the 1920s, it did not begin to coalesce into a separately marketed genre until the appearance in 1926 of Amazing Stories, a pulp magazine published by Hugo Gernsback. By the end of the 1930s the field was booming, and several new sf magazines were launched in 1939. Frederik Pohl, a young science fiction reader, was looking for a job that year. He visited Robert Erisman, who was the editor of two pulps, Marvel Science Stories and Dynamic Science Stories, to ask for a job as an assistant. Erisman turned him down, but suggested that Pohl contact Rogers Terrill at Popular Publications, a leading pulp publisher. Erisman had heard that Popular was starting a new line of magazines, and thought that they might be interested in adding a science fiction title. On October 25, 1939, Pohl visited Terrill and persuaded him to give the idea a try, and left Terrill's office having been hired, at the age of nineteen, to edit two new magazines, on a salary of ten dollars per week. (Note: Pohl later realized that he got the job by an accident of timing; he applied just as the publisher needed new editors for a new line of magazines. Pohl commented that "they would have hired Mothra, or Og, Son of Fire, just about as readily right then, because they were very interested in expanding".) One was Super Science Stories; the other was at one point intended to be titled Incredible Stories, but ultimately appeared as Astonishing Stories.

Popular was uncertain of the sales potential for the two new titles and decided to publish them under its Fictioneers imprint, which was used for lower-paying magazines. Astonishing's first issue was dated February 1940; it was bimonthly, alternating monthly with Super Science Stories. Pohl's budget for an issue was $405: in Pohl's memoirs he recalls Harry Steeger, one of the company owners, breaking down the budget for him: "Two hundred seventy-five dollars for stories. A hundred dollars for black and white art. Thirty dollars for a cover." Pohl could only offer half a cent per word for fiction, well below the rates offered by the leading magazines. (Note: By 1938, John W. Campbell at Astounding Stories was paying one cent per word, with a bonus for the readers' favorite story in the issue.) At ten cents, the magazine was cheaper than any of the other sf magazines of the day, and it sold well, despite Pohl's limited resources. It was certainly assisted by Popular's wide and effective distribution network, and the publisher soon increased Pohl's budget, to pay bonuses for popular stories. (Note: For example, Isaac Asimov records that he was paid five-eighths of a cent per word for his story "Half-Breeds on Venus" in June 1940, and Pohl paid himself three-quarters of a cent per word for "The King's Eye", which appeared in the February 1941 Astonishing under Pohl's "James McCreigh" alias.) Pohl later commented that he was uncertain whether the additional funds really helped to bring in higher quality submissions, although at the time he assured Steeger it would improve the magazine. Some of the additional money went to long-time writer Ray Cummings, who was sufficiently well known that the young Pohl felt unable to reject his stories, even though he disliked his work. Cummings came to see Pohl in person to submit his work, and refused to sell for less than one cent a word; since the first visit came on a day when Pohl had some extra money available, Pohl was never able to bring himself to tell Cummings that he could not really afford to pay that rate. Pohl comments in his memoirs that "for months he would turn up regularly as clockwork and sell me a new story; I hated them all, and bought them all."

	Jan	Feb	Mar	Apr	May	Jun	Jul	Aug	Sep	Oct	Nov	Dec
1940		1/1		1/2		1/3		1/4		2/1		2/2
1941		2/3		2/4					3/1		3/2	
1942			3/3			3/4				4/1		4/2
1943		4/3		4/4								
Issues of Astonishing Stories, showing volume/issue number. The colors identify the editors for each issue: Frederik Pohl until September 1941, and Alden H. Norton for the remaining issues.

Pohl stretched his budget by reducing the space he needed to fill with fiction. For example, a long letter column took up several pages but required no payment; similarly, running advertisements for Popular's other magazines did not use up the fiction budget. Some authors sent inaccurate word counts with the stories they submitted, and Popular saved money by paying them on the basis of whichever word count was less—the author's or one done by Popular's staff. The result was a saving of forty to fifty dollars per issue. More money was saved by reusing snipped elements of black and white illustrations to fill space, as multiple uses of the same artwork did not require additional payments to the artist.

Towards the end of 1940 Popular doubled Pohl's salary to twenty dollars per week. (Note: It is not clear from Pohl's memoirs exactly when this happened. According to his autobiographical essay "Ragged Claws" he was paid ten dollars a week for the first six months, which would imply his pay was increased in about April 1940. However, in his autobiography, The Way the Future Was, he makes it clear that the pay raise occurred after he was married in August 1940.) In June 1941 Pohl went to see Steeger to ask for a further raise; he was planning to resign and work as a free-lance writer if he did not get more pay. Steeger, in Pohl's words, "had complaints of his own", and was not receptive; by the end of the meeting Pohl had lost his job as editor. Pohl later commented "I have never been sure whether I quit or got fired." (Note: Steeger was probably complaining about poor sales: Isaac Asimov recalls finding out on June 13, 1941, about Pohl's departure from Popular, and notes "his magazines were doing poorly, and he was being relieved of his editorial position".) Instead of replacing Pohl, Popular assigned editor-in-chief Alden H. Norton to add the magazines to his responsibilities. The arrangement lasted for seven months, after which Norton asked Pohl to return as his assistant. Norton offered Pohl a higher salary as an associate editor than he had received as the editor, and Pohl quickly accepted.

Pohl was not eligible to be drafted for military service as he was married, but by the end of 1942 his marriage was over and he decided to enlist. As voluntary enlistment was suspended he was unable to immediately join the army, but eventually was inducted on April 1, 1943. Paper was difficult to obtain because of the war, and Popular decided to close the magazine down; the final issue, dated April 1943, was assembled with the assistance of Ejler Jakobsson. (Note: According to Pohl, there was ample paper at the mills in Canada, but because of the war there was no transportation available to bring it to the U.S.)

== Contents and reception ==
Because of the low rates of pay, the stories submitted to Astonishing in its first year had generally already been rejected elsewhere. However, Pohl was a member of the Futurians, a group of science fiction fans that included Isaac Asimov, C.M. Kornbluth, Richard Wilson and Donald Wollheim; the Futurians were eager to become professional writers and were glad to submit stories to Pohl. Asimov recalls in his memoirs that on October 27, 1939, two days after Pohl was hired to edit the magazines, Pohl turned up at Asimov's apartment and asked to buy "Half-Breed", a story Pohl had been trying to sell on Asimov's behalf since June of that year. Pohl needed stories quickly for the first issue of Astonishing (though the name had not yet been selected), and as the story had been rejected by Amazing Stories and Astounding Stories, Asimov was willing to sell it for half a cent per word. A couple of weeks later Pohl also acquired "The Callistan Menace" from Asimov. The other Futurians were prolific as well; in Pohl's first year as an editor he bought a total of fifteen stories from them for the two magazines. Damon Knight, another of the Futurians, recalled in his memoirs that Pohl once asked the group for a story to fill out an issue, with $35 available to pay for it. Kornbluth and Wilson wrote a first draft, alternating turns at the typewriter; the result was edited by Harry Dockweiler, another Futurian, and then again by Pohl before it appeared in the April 1940 Astonishing under the title "Stepsons of Mars", with a byline of "Ivar Towers". Pohl contributed material himself, using the pseudonyms "James McCreigh" and "Dirk Wylie" (the latter pseudonym was also used by Dockweiler); he used his own stories when he needed to fill an issue, and to supplement his salary of ten dollars a week. Particularly after his marriage to Doris Baumgardt in August 1940, Pohl realized that his salary covered their apartment rent with almost no money left over, and began to augment his income by selling to himself as well as to other magazines. When Pohl lost his job as editor in late 1941, he had bought from himself (and paid for) a couple of stories that he had not actually written, and hence had to write them very quickly and turn them in. (Note: One of the stories was "Daughters of Eternity", which appeared in Astonishing Stories in February 1942; the other was probably "Wings of the Lightning Land", which Pohl records was written in a single night and which was published in the November 1941 Astonishing.)

The first issue of Astonishing Stories was dated February 1940; the lead story was "Chameleon Planet" by John Russell Fearn, and it also included Asimov's "Half-Breed" and fiction by Henry Kuttner and Manly Wade Wellman. Despite the difficulties caused by the low budget, Pohl was able to pay his authors promptly, unlike some of his competitors, and he thus began to receive stories of higher quality. Sf historian Mike Ashley identifies "The Last Drop", by L. Ron Hubbard and L. Sprague de Camp as one of the better stories in Astonishing; historians Milton Wolf and Raymond H. Thompson consider the story to be unimpressive, and point instead to Alfred Bester's "The Pet Nebula" in the February 1941 issue. Kuttner's "Soldiers of Space" and Robert Bloch's "It Happened Tomorrow", both of which appeared in the February 1943 issue, are also praised. Pohl was also able to print the first three of Ross Rocklynne's well-liked "Into the Darkness" series. Other well-known writers who appeared in the pages of Astonishing include Leigh Brackett, Clifford Simak, and E. E. Smith.

Pohl told his readers in Astonishing's first issue that he would listen to their feedback and respond to their requests. In addition to paying attention to their comments on stories, he included departments in the magazine that encouraged interaction with the fans, such as a letter column, a section that listed fanzines with names and addresses, and a review column. The reviews, primarily by Wollheim, but also including contributions from Richard Wilson, Forrest Ackerman, and John Michel, were of a higher standard than elsewhere in the field, and historian Paul Carter regards Astonishing and Super Science Stories as the place where "book reviewing for the first time began to merit the term 'literary criticism'", and adds that "it was in those magazines that the custom began of paying attention to science fiction on the stage and screen also."

The artwork in Astonishing was initially quite poor, which was unsurprising given the minuscule budget Pohl had to work with. Much of the art was supplied by fans and artists early in their careers, including Doris Baumgardt (under the pseudonym Leslie Perri) and Dorothy Les Tina, who later became Pohl's first and second wives, respectively. One fan artist who stood out from the rest was Hannes Bok, who went on to become a well-respected artist with a very distinctive style. Ray Bradbury commented positively on Bok's work in a letter in the August 1940 Astonishing, and Bok subsequently illustrated a story of Bradbury's in the April 1943 issue. Aleck Portegal, Popular's art director, had initially told Pohl that the regular artists would be unwilling to work for the low rates he could offer, but in the event some of them were willing to take less pay to get the extra work. More professional art began to appear in the magazine, including work by Virgil Finlay, Alexander Leydenfrost, Leo Morey, Hans Wessolowski, and Frank R. Paul, all well known in the field. Some art appeared under the name Stephen Lawrence, which was known to be a pseudonym of Lawrence Stevens, but it was subsequently discovered that some of this work was actually by Lawrence Stevens' son Peter.

Astonishing Stories is not remembered as being among the best science fiction magazines: both critic Peter Nicholls and sf writer Jack Williamson have described it as a "training ground" for writers who would go on to do their best work elsewhere. However, Nicholls adds that "its stories were surprisingly good considering how little was paid for them", and Wolf and Thompson agree, claiming that "there was much that was memorable in Astonishing, both by way of immediate appeal and of more lasting quality". Pohl himself, who later became a very successful magazine editor, felt he made many mistakes. He quotes as an example his serialization of Malcolm Jameson's story "Quicksands of Youthwardness" in three parts; the story was only 27,000 words long, and readers complained (justifiably, in Pohl's view) that serializing it in a bimonthly magazine meant they had to wait for five months to read the whole story, in relatively small 9,000-word pieces. Overall, Pohl assessed his performance by saying "I wasn't really a very good editor"; adding "With what I know now I could have made those magazines sing, but as it was they just lay there".

== Bibliographic details ==
Astonishing Stories was edited by Frederik Pohl from February 1940 through September 1941 (nine issues), and then by Alden H. Norton from November 1941 through April 1943 (seven issues). It was published by Fictioneers, Inc., a subsidiary of Popular Publications. It was pulp-sized throughout its run, with 112 pages and a cover price of 10 cents. The volume numbering was regular, with four volumes of four numbers. It was bimonthly for the first eight issues; the next four were on an irregular schedule, and the last four, from October 1942, were bimonthly again.

A Canadian edition appeared for three issues, dated January, March, and May 1942, published by Popular Publications' Toronto branch. It was priced at 10 cents and ran to 96 pages; it was also in pulp format, but fractionally larger than the US version. The first and third issues reprinted the November 1941 and March 1942 US issues of Astonishing, but the March 1942 Canadian issue was a reprint of the November 1941 Super Science Stories, omitting one story. The covers in all three issues were replaced by new paintings, and the interior artwork was also different. The artists responsible for the new illustrations and covers were not credited. In August 1942 a Canadian edition of Super Science Stories began which also alternated between reprinting the US editions of Astonishing and Super Science Stories; this could be regarded as a continuation of the Canadian edition of Astonishing, although the volume numbering was restarted at volume 1 number 1 when the name was changed.

== Sources ==
- Aldiss, Brian W.; Harrison, Harry (1976). Hell's Cartographers. London: Futura. ISBN 0-86007-907-4
- Ashley, Mike (2000). The Time Machines:The Story of the Science-Fiction Pulp Magazines from the beginning to 1950. Liverpool: Liverpool University Press. ISBN 0-85323-865-0.
- Asimov, Isaac (1973). The Early Asimov, or Eleven Years of Trying: Volume 2. London: Panther. ISBN 0-586-03936-8.
- Asimov, Isaac (1979). In Memory Yet Green. Garden City, NY: Doubleday. ISBN 0-385-13679-X.
- Carter, Paul A. (1977). The Creation of Tomorrow: Fifty Years of Magazine Science Fiction. New York: Columbia University Press. ISBN 0-231-04211-6.
- Clute, John; Nicholls, Peter (1993). The Encyclopedia of Science Fiction. New York: St. Martin's Press, Inc. ISBN 0-312-09618-6.
- Knight, Damon (1977). The Futurians. New York: John Day (book club edition).
- Pohl, Frederik (1979). The Way the Future Was. London: Gollancz. ISBN 0-575-02672-3.
- Pohl, Frederik (1980). The Early Pohl. London: Dobson. ISBN 0-234-72198-7.
- Tuck, Donald H. (1982). The Encyclopedia of Science Fiction and Fantasy: Volume 3. Chicago: Advent: Publishers. ISBN 0-911682-26-0.
- Tymn, Marshall B.; Ashley, Mike (1985). Science Fiction, Fantasy and Weird Fiction Magazines. Westport, CT: Greenwood Press. ISBN 0-313-21221-X.
