= Dirk Wylie =

Joseph Harold Dockweiler (1920 – August 1948), professionally known by his pen name Dirk Wylie, was an American science fiction author and literary agent. Wylie was a member of The Futurians, a 1940s-era science fiction fan community.

== Biography ==
Wylie attended Brooklyn Technical High School in the 1930s, where he became friends with fellow student Frederik Pohl.

In 1934, a teenage Wylie had a letter published in periodical Wonder Stories inquiring about "Science Fiction Week." Both Wylie and Pohl dropped out of high school after their junior year.

In 1937, Wylie published a fanzine titled Fantasy Mirror. As an adult, he wrote stories in collaboration with Pohl, Arnold Kummer Jr., and Cyril M. Kornbluth. Wylie also used the pen names "Dennis Lavond" and "Elliott Whitney".

In 1937, Wylie joined the Committee for the Political Advancement of Science Fiction (CPASF), a left-wing group of Futurians who supported the views of fellow member John B. Michel.

When the Futurians group fractured, Wylie and Pohl followed Michel and Donald Wollheim to form the East New York Science Fiction League. In 1940, Wylie married fellow Futurian Rosalind "Roz" Cohen.

Wylie was drafted and served as a sergeant in a military police company in World War II. He was stationed in Belgium during the Battle of the Bulge. Wylie suffered a spine injury after jumping from a transport truck; he was evacuated and spent two years in a Veterans Administration hospital. While hospitalized, Wylie penned a letter to Amazing Stories in which he reported two instances of having witnessed an unidentified objects, in some cases rising from the ocean and returning to it.

In 1947, Wylie and Pohl set up the Dirk Wylie Literary Agency. In August 1948, Wylie died from tuberculosis of the spine. After his death, Pohl and Rosalin continued to run the agency.

== Works ==
- "Stepsons of Mars" (April 1940 Astonishing Stories) (with C M Kornbluth and Richard Wilson)
- "Vacant World" (January 1941 Super Science Stories) (with C M Kornbluth)
- Stuff (1940)
- The Mantle of Graag (1941) with Robert A. W. Lowndes and Frederik Pohl
- Something from Beyond (1941) with Robert A. W. Lowndes and Frederik Pohl
- Highwayman of the Void
- Asteroid of the Damned (1942)
- Sky Test (1942)
- Outpost of the Eons (1943)
- Star of the Undead (1948) with Robert A. W. Lowndes and Frederik Pohl
- When Time Went Mad (publish posthumously in 1950) with Frederic Arnold Kummer Jr.
