= Pacificon =

Pacificon may refer to:

- Pacificon I, held in Los Angeles in 1946
- Pacificon II, held in Oakland in 1964
