= 5th World Science Fiction Convention =

5th Worldcon (1947)

Philcon I, the 5th World Science Fiction Convention
- Genre: Science fiction
- Dates: 30 August–1 September 1947
- Venue: Penn-Sheraton Hotel
- Location: Philadelphia, Pennsylvania
- Country: United States
- Attendance: ~200

The 5th World Science Fiction Convention (Worldcon), also known as Philcon I, was held on 30 August–1 September 1947 at the Penn-Sheraton Hotel in Philadelphia, Pennsylvania, United States.

The chairman was Milton Rothman.

== Participants ==
Attendance was approximately 200.

=== Guests of honor ===
- John W. Campbell, Jr.
- L. Jerome Stanton (toastmaster)

== See also ==
- Hugo Award
- Science fiction
- Speculative fiction
- World Science Fiction Society
- Worldcon

Preceded by 4th World Science Fiction Convention; Pacificon I in Los Angeles, California, United States (1946)	List of Worldcons; 5th World Science Fiction Convention; Philcon I in Philadelphia, Pennsylvania, United States (1947)	Succeeded by 6th World Science Fiction Convention; Torcon I in Toronto, Ontario, Canada (1948)
