= Torcon =

Torcon is the name given to three Worldcons held in Toronto, Ontario, Canada:

- Torcon I, the 6th World Science Fiction Convention, held in 1948
- Torcon II, the 31st World Science Fiction Convention, held in 1973
- Torcon 3, the 61st World Science Fiction Convention, held in 2003
