= PSFS =

PSFS may refer to:

- Philadelphia Savings Fund Society
- Philadelphia Science Fiction Society
