= 13th World Science Fiction Convention =

13th Worldcon (1955)

Clevention, the 13th World Science Fiction Convention
- Genre: Science fiction
- Dates: 2–5 September 1955
- Venue: Manger Hotel
- Location: Cleveland, Ohio
- Country: United States
- Attendance: ~380
- Filing status: non-profit

The 13th World Science Fiction Convention (Worldcon), also known as Clevention, was held on 2–5 September 1955 at the Manger Hotel in Cleveland, Ohio, United States.

The chairmen were Nick and Noreen Falasca. The guests of honor were Isaac Asimov (pro) and Sam Moskowitz (mystery GoH).

== Participants ==
Attendance was approximately 380.

== Awards ==
The World Science Fiction Society administers and presents the Hugo Awards, the oldest and most noteworthy award for science fiction. Selection of the recipients is by vote of the Worldcon members. Categories include novels and short fiction, artwork, dramatic presentations, and various professional and fandom activities.

Other awards may be presented at Worldcon at the discretion of the individual convention committee. This has often included the national SF awards of the host country, such as the Japanese Seiun Awards as part of Nippon 2007, and the Prix Aurora Awards as part of Anticipation in 2009. The Astounding Award for Best New Writer and the Sidewise Award, though not sponsored by the Worldcon, are usually presented, as well as the Chesley Awards, the Prometheus Award, and others. In 2021, the Nommo Awards began presenting at Worldcon.

=== 1955 Hugo Awards ===
This convention was the second Worldcon to award the Hugos, and Hugo Awards have been a permanent fixture of the conventions since then. The 11th was the first one, but the 12th did not award any awards.

The winners were:

- Best Novel: They'd Rather Be Right, by Mark Clifton and Frank Riley
- Best Novelette: "The Darfsteller", by Walter M. Miller, Jr.
- Best Short Story: "Allamagoosa", by Eric Frank Russell
- Best Professional Artist: Frank Kelly Freas
- Best Professional Magazine: Astounding, edited by John W. Campbell, Jr.
- Best Fanzine: Fantasy Times, edited by James V. Taurasi, Sr. and Ray Van Houten

== See also ==
- Hugo Award
- Science fiction
- Speculative fiction
- World Science Fiction Society
- Worldcon

Preceded by 12th World Science Fiction Convention; SFCon in San Francisco, California, United States (1954)	List of Worldcons; 13th World Science Fiction Convention; Clevention in Cleveland, Ohio, United States (1955)	Succeeded by 14th World Science Fiction Convention; NYCon II in New York City, United States (1956)
