= Tales of Tomorrow =

US science fiction TV series, 1951–1953

- Genre: Anthology; Science fiction
- Directed by: Charles S. Dubin; Don Medford; Leslie Gorall; Franklin J. Schaffner; Leonard Valenta
- Country of origin: United States
- Original language: English
- No. of seasons: 2
- No. of episodes: 85

Production
- Running time: 25 minutes

Original release
- Network: ABC
- Release: August 3, 1951 – June 12, 1953

Tales of Tomorrow is an American anthology science fiction series that was performed and broadcast live on ABC from 1951 to 1953. The series covered such stories as Frankenstein starring Lon Chaney Jr., 20,000 Leagues Under the Sea starring Thomas Mitchell as Captain Nemo, and many others.

== Cast ==
Besides Chaney and Mitchell, the show featured such performers as Boris Karloff, James Dean, Brian Keith, Lee J. Cobb, Eva Gabor, Veronica Lake, Rod Steiger, Bruce Cabot, John Newland, Franchot Tone, Louis Hector, Gene Lockhart, Walter Abel, Cloris Leachman, Leslie Nielsen, Joanne Woodward, Burgess Meredith and Paul Newman. The series had many similarities to the later Twilight Zone which also covered one of the same stories, "What You Need". In total it ran for eighty-five 30-minute episodes. It was called "the best science-fiction fare on TV today" by Paul Fairman, editor of If.

== Production ==
The idea for this science fiction television series was developed by Theodore Sturgeon and Mort Abrahams, and presented under the auspices of the Science Fiction League of America. This entity, not to be confused with the Science Fiction League, may have been a creation of the producers; author Robert Heinlein was contacted in 1951 by Sturgeon and Abrahams about their plan to "put together a league of s-f authors to write television screenplays for a new proposed TV series, Tomorrow is Yours (the original title of the show)." A deal was struck with Richard Gordon and George Foley, giving the producers of the show first choice of any of the 2,000 short stories and 13 novels by the various members of the League.

Tales of Tomorrow was the first dramatized showcase for several authors, including Arthur C. Clarke. Other early science fiction writers whose work was reflected in the series included Fredric Brown ("The Last Man on Earth" and "Age of Peril"), Philip Wylie ("Blunder"), C. M. Kornbluth ("The Little Black Bag") and Stanley G. Weinbaum ("The Miraculous Serum"). The show was intended for adults; at the time, most science fiction productions were targeted to children. The producers wanted to blend mystery and science fiction, and to emphasize fast pacing and suspense.

== Episodes ==
As an anthology show, each episode had a self-contained plot. Every episode started with a brief bit of narration that mentioned the show's sponsor(s).

=== Series overview ===
Season	Episodes	Originally released	
Season	Episodes	First released	Last released
1	43	August 3, 1951	August 8, 1952
2	42	August 22, 1952	June 12, 1953

=== Season 1 (1951–52) ===
No. overall	No. in season	Title	Written by	Original release date	Episode status
1	1	"Verdict from Space"	Theodore Sturgeon	August 3, 1951	Exists
An inventor is on trial for killing a professor for five-thousand dollars. In his defence, the inventor claims that the professor paid him the five-thousand dollars use his invention to help the professor open a metal door in a remote mountain, behind which sits a machine that has been recording every tremour on Earth for a million years. The inventor notices something that the professor didn't: that a part of the machine is broadcasting the data into space. The inventor surmises that an alien intelligence has been monitoring Earth so that, if Earthlings were to even invent a hydrogen bomb, they would know we're a threat and would attack. The jury does not believe the inventor's tale, but almost immediately after they announce their guilty verdict, Earth is attacked by the alien intelligence. Sponsor: Jacques Kreisler.
2	2	"Blunder"	Teleplay by : Charles O'Neill; From an original play by : Philip Wylie	August 10, 1951	Exists
A nuclear engineer in a remote area is about to begin operation of an experimental nuclear reactor involving bismuth which he has learned from a scientific journal that new research shows is fissile under certain conditions. Because of heavy censorship in such information he is not aware of the full article in the journal which warns against using the type of reactor he is about to put up and running as it will literally destroy the Earth. He stubbornly refuses to speak to who he assumes are small minded people who are trying to plead him not to put his reactor online, and now they are in a desperate race to get to him in his remote location and stop him before he blows up the Earth. They fail to reach him in time. Sponsor: The American Broadcasting Company.
3	3	"A Child Is Crying"	Story by : John MacDonald; Teleplay by : Alvin Sapinsley	August 17, 1951	Exists
A young girl whose intelligence is beyond measure is recruited by the U. S. military to aid in the development of a bomb whose destructive force dwarfs that of the hydrogen bomb—which she does. It is soon revealed that her mental acuity is so pronounced that she can control other people's actions through telepathic "suggestion" and see patterns in apparently-random phenomena sufficient to determine the future. The military wants to harness this ability to foretell attacks against the U. S., and while she confirms that an attack is imminent, she refuses to say who will attack because she knows that the U. S.'s response would be to engage in a preëmptive attack, which would merely result in a responsive attack and escalation. The girl reveals that there are only twenty people worldwide with her degree of intelligence, and that, after the coming world war, only 150 million will survive, including all twenty of the savants, who will then go about rebuilding the world. Because the military is unable to get her to reveal the date of the attack if the identity of the attacker, they resort to injecting her with a truth serum. The one scientist in the party refuses to apply the injection, not only because he respects her autonomy, but because it could have deleterious effects on her intelligence. The military proceeds with the injection despite his objections. Under the influence, she reveals a small range of dates on which the attack might occur, and that she was the only person in the room who would survive, but nothing more. After a couple of minutes, who intelligence rapidly declines to the level of an average girl her age; she no longer has the knowledge the military seeks, and won't regain it in time for the military to be able to exploit her. For now, she is a normal, scared child; she cries and begs for her mom.
4	4	"The Woman at Land's End"	Unknown	August 24, 1951	Missing
5	5	"The Last Man on Earth"	Fredric Brown	August 31, 1951	Missing
6	6	"Errand Boy"	William Tenn	September 7, 1951	Missing
7	7	"The Monsters"	Robert Sheckley	September 14, 1951	Missing
8	8	"The Dark Angel"	Story by : Lewis Padgett; Teleplay by : Alvin Sapinsley	September 28, 1951	Exists
Tim Hathaway is explaining to a man why he shot his wife. It all started five years earlier. Joanne Hathaway broke her rib, as confirmed by her X-ray scan. Two days later, her new X-ray scan confirmed that her ribs were fully healed with no sign of fracture. Alarmed, her doctor compares her then-current X-ray scans to those from two years prior, and discovered that her heart had grown smaller and that her appendix had disappeared—despite the lack of an appendectomy; he confided his findings in her husband. When Tim approached his wife regarding the findings, she explained that she was changing, becoming much more intelligent, and had even gained telekinetic abilities. She explained that she would soon outgrow him, and that it would be best if she left him before things changed more. He did not see his wife again for a year, when he discovered that she was working at a lab in Berkley, where she had developed a new scientific process. At first, she tells him she will not return to him, but later relents and says she will get her coat. She enters a closet; a minute later, Tim looks in the closet but Joanne is not there. He does not see her again until this night at a bar. She says she does not love him and that she will soon be a ruler. The bartender overhears her, so she kills him with her mind. Tim realizes that she is no longer human and no longer has any compassion for humans, which is why—as he explains to the man—he had to shoot her. The man then reveals that she is not dead, that she cannot die, that he is the man for whom she was waiting in the bar, that he is like her, and that they will rule together; he then kills Tim with his mind. Sponsor: Kreisler.
9	9	"The Crystal Egg"	Story by : H.G. Wells; Teleplay by : Mel Goldberg	October 12, 1951	Exists
A man enters a shop and asks to purchase a crystal egg. Charles Cave, the shopkeeper, sees how desperately the man wishes to buy the egg and tells him it will be £5.00. The man does not have that much on him and says he will return with the remainder. Cave, wondering why someone would pay so much for a crystal egg, takes it to Professor Frederick Vaneck to find out whether there is anything special about it. The egg really catches Vaneck's attention when it starts glowing. Vaneck studies it all night, discovering that it contains the landscape of Mars within it, and even a Martian lifeform. Cave returns and takes the egg before Vaneck can appeal to him otherwise. Before Vaneck sees Cave again, Cave is murdered in an alleyway; there is no mention by the police of the egg being found with the body. No one believes Vaneck about the egg, yet he remains convinced that Martians use it to vigilantly watch Earth. As he records on vinyl a plea for people to find the crystal egg before it is too late, he is shot, and someone (or something) breaks the vinyl record into pieces.
10	10	"Test Flight"	Story by : Nelson Bond; Teleplay by : Mel Goldberg	October 26, 1951	Exists
A rich tycoon sinks millions of dollars into a project to build a manned interplanetary spaceship. He wants to be the first man in space! One problem: an engine has never been designed powerful enough to get a ship into space. So, he offers a handsome reward to anyone who can design such an engine. One man does; his engine works by means of magnetism. He isn't all too interested in the money, however; his primary interest is that he be on the flight; the tycoon agrees. Months go by, and the tycoon—and his company's shareholders—grow restless. On the day the spaceship is to take off, a representative of the shareholders—believing the ship will not work—demands that the tycoon stop the project; the tycoon refuses, and boards the ship with the engineer. After the ship makes it into space, the tycoon tells the engineer to return to Earth; they had proved that the ship works, and would be sure to visit Mars in the near future. The engineer says that they are going to Mars now, and that there is no way for the tycoon to stop the trip. The engineer didn't care that they would both be rich and famous-his only concern was getting home to Mars. Sponsor: Kreisler.
11	11	"The Search for the Flying Saucer"	Mel Goldberg	November 9, 1951	Exists
Vic is a Lieutenant in the Air Corps who has been grounded for reporting sightings of flying saucers. Posing as a reporter, he's come to an American town called Las Palmas, from whence many reports of flying saucers have come. Everyone refuses to talk to him about them, though—everyone save for "Crazy John," who says he knows where the saucers land and the cave in which they are hidden; he says that the people who know about the saucers are, one by one, being mysteriously killed. Ginny, who's running the inn at which Vic and "Crazy John" are both staying, says that all of the stories of flying saucers coming out of Las Palmas have the same source ("Crazy John"). Ginny and Vic quickly fall in love with one another, despite having known each other for an extremely short time. Ginny tries unsuccessfully to convince Vic not to go to the caves with "Crazy John." After Vic leaves, Ginny talks with a man about how they should never have come to this planet, that people like Vic would keep coming, keep searching relentlessly for the truth; she says that they can't kill Vic like the others because, then, the military would come to investigate. The man tells her that they have to leave in a half hour. Privately, Ginny cries, saying to herself that she didn't come to this planet to fall in love, and now she has to leave her love behind. Sponsor: Kreisler.
12	12	"Enemy Unknown"	Theodore Sturgeon	November 23, 1951	Missing
13	13	"Sneak Attack"	Story by : Russell V. Ritchey; Teleplay by : Mel Goldberg	December 7, 1951	Exists
In 1960, American soldier, Major Ray Clinton, awakens in a hospital in a foreign country—one of the countries at which the United States had been at war fifteen years earlier—and told that he sustained five bullets in the legs and cannot walk. Doctor Maroff tells him that the only reason he is alive is that her government thinks he's one of its own operatives and is only pretending to be an American. He convinces her he really is American, and she divulges that her government is working on a weapon to bring his country to its knees—a weapon only a few rooms away. Meanwhile, in the United States, a fleet of foreign aircraft with American markings, guided by robots, land in airfields all across the country; the U. S. government knows not from where they came. The U. S. government tries to gain entry into one of the aircraft, and sets off an explosion that levels Denver. After, the foreign government gives the U. S. government four hours to surrender; otherwise, the U. S. will be levelled by the newly-developed heterodyne bombs implanted in each of the aircraft. Major Clinton radios a message to his government that he will stop the bombs. Doctor Maroff helps him get to the room, and he does exactly that. The episode ends with the U. S. president saying, "Yes, it's retired now, time to answer still another sneak attack—1941, 1960–when does it end? When will they realize that we've tasted liberty, and prefer death to life on our knees? When will they realize that we want only peace and freedom?" Sponsor: Kreisler.
14	14	"The Invader"	Robert Foshko & Mort Zarcoff	December 21, 1951	Exists
It's 1952, and a small crew, led by Doctor Burroughs, are on a vessel collecting scientific specimens and studying a deadly gas. Burroughs's son, Roy, is aboard, but Burroughs does not respect his son. One night, they see what they believe to be a meteor—until they see it zig and zag. It lands in the water. The official diver is already two days past his contract, and refuses to go down. Old Burroughs, despite his weakened condition, says he will go down, but Roy volunteers to go in his stead. Roy gains his father's respect. When Roy returns, he seems confused and disoriented—and strangely cold to his fiancée, Laura (played by Eva Gabor). Roy tells Burroughs that it really was just a meteor, and the apparent zigzagging was an optical illusion. After, one by one, Roy kills everyone onboard save for Burroughs, and reveals to Burroughs that his real name is Chloro, and that Burroughs was correct to think it was a spaceship; the real Roy was dead. Chloro's agenda is to get to the mainland and report back to his people, who will then colonize Earth and kill all of the humans, who are inferior beings. Burroughs thwarts this plot by releasing the poisonous gas, killing them both. Sponsor: Kreisler.
15	15	"The Dune Roller"	Story by : Julian C. May; Teleplay by : Charles O'Neill	January 4, 1952	Exists
A biologist and a physicist are collecting samples of an exotic mineral that no one has before discovered. The mineral has bizarre qualities, like rapidly heating from being tapped a few times, or like fusing with other stones of the same mineral; after the fusing, the rock that results is more massive than the two constituent stones. A friend of the two scientists phone them late one night to report a strange light on the lake and that he's coming to their cottage for the night; on his way, the friend—who has a couple stones of the mineral in his pocket—is pursued and killed by the source of the light. The scientists hypothesize that there might be a giant, burning-hot, rolling rock made of the exotic mineral that is attracted to other pieces of the same mineral, and that this rock poses a threat to anyone with the mineral in her or his pocket. So, they use some pieces of the mineral to bait the big, rolling rock, and when it arrives, they blow it to pieces with dynamite. They leave, sure the threat is now neutralized; the viewing audience, however, sees the pieces quickly begin refusing to one another.
16	16	"Frankenstein"	Mary Shelley	January 18, 1952	Exists, no closing credits
Victor Frankenstein played by John Newland has built an artificial man (played by Lon Chaney Jr.) out of human parts and, with currents of electricity, brings this creature to life. The creature escapes the lab and wanders around the castle inadvertently terrorizing its inhabitants, even killing a maid. When it grabs the butler, Frankenstein distracts it with some fire, allowing the butler to shoot it six times. The creature falls through a window, and Frankenstein believes it dead—until the castle's inhabitants hear it again. Frankenstein's wife, Elizabeth, and boy named William help lure the creature back to Frankenstein's lab by singing together, where Frankenstein uses more electricity to unmake the life he made.
17	17	"20,000 Leagues Under the Sea: Part One: The Chase"	Jules Verne	January 25, 1952	Missing
Sponsor: C. H. Masland & Sons.
18	18	"20,000 Leagues Under the Sea: Part Two: The Escape"	Jules Verne	February 1, 1952<--According to the closing credits, this episode was "Telecast Live March 14, 1952"-->	Exists, no closing credits
After Captain Nemo's daughter interacts with the two men he's holding captive on his underwater vessel, The Nautilus, he forbids her from seeing them again. The two men (one of whom is played by Leslie Nielsen), conspiring with a member of Nemo's crew, hatch a plan to take the vessel to the surface and escape on lifeboats, but Nemo thwarts them. Nemo's daughter visits the men and one kisses her. He tells her of their next escape plan, but his compatriot worries that she will tell her father. The first man assures the second that she won't, saying, "You see, if she did tell, how could she escape with us?" When the time is right, she unshackles the men and attempts to escape with them. When Nemo catches them, his daughter explains that living under his control is not freedom, that "You can't make freedom for somebody else, you can only give it." Nemo thereafter allows all three to leave.
19	19	"What You Need"	Henry Kuttner	February 8, 1952	Exists, no closing credits
With his wife, Peter Talley runs a small shop called I Have What You Need. Tom Carmichael is an unscrupulous investigative journalist who has noticed people go into the shop, pay exorbitant sums, and leave with the most random of objects; he thinks there's more to the story, and wants to write about the shop. He goes in and engages in an acerbic exchange with Talley. Talley gives Carmichael a pair of shears and instructions to keep them on his person; he tells Carmichael that the only thing he wants in exchange is for Carmichael to never return. Carmichael thinks Talley is some kind of charlatan until, later that evening, when Carmichael's scarf gets caught in a press, the shears save his life. He returns to Talley's shop for answers, and learns that Talley has a machine that allows him to see multiple possible futures (free will is what makes the different futures only possible). Talley says that he does not use his machine for the money, but because his clients are good people who will do good things for the future of humanity; he says he does not want to do anything more for Carmichael, but Carmichael threatens to expose Talley if Talley does not continue giving Carmichael what Carmichael needs. Talley relents and says he'll send someone by later with what Carmichael needs. When next Talley uses his machine, he sees a future two weeks away in which Carmichael kills him and steals his machine. Later, Carmichael receives the delivery: a pair of shoes. He immediately puts the shoes on and proceeds outside, where he slips on the ice and is killed by a car. Back in his shop, Talley tells his wife that he killed the young man, and explains that it was his life or Carmichael's. Nevertheless, Talley is distraught at what he has done, and despite his wife's protests, he destroys his machine.
20	20	"Age of Peril"	Story by : Fredric Brown; Teleplay by : A. J. Russell	February 15, 1952	Exists
The year is 1965, and the Bureau of Scientific Investigation is designing a weapon so top secret, plans for the weapon are divided into parts and worked on separately. When part of the plans are stolen, the Bureau sends in an investigator, who uses the assistance of the inventor of a new lie detector machine that only misses once in a hundred-thousand; it is so reliable, it is used in court to determine a suspects true innocence or guilt. The investigator is convinced it is an inside job, and the detector is used to question every worker at the plant; they all pass. The investigator begins to suspect the head of security because he refuses to take the test, but those suspicions are dampened when the investigator notices that the telephones have been tapped. The use the tapped telephones to set a trap, and later that night, when a man opens the vault, an automatic camera snaps his image. They know he's guilty, but when he takes the test, the detector indicates he's being honest. The Bureau divulges to the investigator that forty-eight people have beaten the test, and that next day, a murderer in San Diego also beats the test. The investigator convinces the head of security to take the test, which he passes. After the sensors are removed, they are handed to the inventor, and his responses to questions whilst holding said sensors indicate that the inventor knows more than he's letting on. The inventor admits that he helped the man who opened the vault, as well as the murderer in San Diego. He demonstrates that he has been using hypnosis to make criminals forget that they had ever committed crimes and also to turn away from lives of crime. His aim is to eliminate crime by hypnotizing criminals into being noncriminals. Sponsor: Kreisler Watch Bands.
21	21	"Memento"	Unknown	February 22, 1952	Missing
Starring Boris Karloff.
22	22	"The Children's Room"	Story by : Raymond F. Jones; Teleplay by : Mel Goldberg	February 29, 1952	Exists
A young boy named Walt has an IQ of 240. Walt's mother, Rose, tells Walt's father, Bill, about the book Walt has been reading: it is written in weird hieroglyphics that Rose cannot decipher. Bill asks Walt about the book, and Walt explains to his father that he got the book from the children's room in the university library. Bill is able to read the book, and the page he reads tells him that the readers are a superior race of humans, a race of mutants superior to normal humans. The following day, Bill speaks with the librarian, saying he wishes to return the book to the children's room; the librarian says that there is no children's room and that the book is unreadable. Bill finds the children's room all the same, and the woman there explains that Bill is also a mutant; lest, he wouldn't have been able to read the book or see the children's room. She also explains that Walt and children like him are important to the future, and will be needed to defend the Earth from an alien invasion that is approaching. Finally, she explains that Walt will have to be taken away from his parents—but that, since Bill is also a mutant, Bill might be able to come along. Days later, Bill learns that his own mutation is insignificant, and that he would not be able to come with Walt. Bill and Rose speak with Walt to dissuade him from reading any more of the books; Walt convinces them that he is torn, does not want to leave his parents, and wants to stop reading the books. After his parents leave his room, he sneaks out his window and runs away, leaving only a note behind. Sponsor: Kreisler.
23	23	"Bound Together"	Mel Goldberg	March 7, 1952	Missing
24	24	"Diamond Lens"	Unknown	March 14, 1952	Exists, no closing credits
25	25	"The Fisherman's Wife"	Gil & Harry Ingraham	March 21, 1952	Exists
26	26	"Flight Overdue"	David Davidson; From an original idea by : Jim Lister	March 28, 1952	Exists
27	27	"And a Little Child"	Unknown	April 4, 1952	Missing
28	28	"Sleep No More"	Mann Rubin	April 11, 1952	Missing
29	29	"Time to Go"	Mann Rubin	April 18, 1952	Exists
30	30	"Plague from Space"	Mann Rubin	April 25, 1952	Exists, no closing credits
31	31	"Red Dust"	Teleplay by : Irving Elman; Adapted from a play by : Theodore Cogswell	May 2, 1952	Exists
32	32	"The Golden Ingot"	Unknown	May 9, 1952	Exists, no closing credits
33	33	"The Black Planet"	Mann Rubin	May 16, 1952	Exists, no closing credits
34	34	"World of Water"	Story by : M.J. Gorley & James V. McGlinchey; Teleplay by : Mann Rubin	May 23, 1952	Exists
35	35	"The Little Black Bag"	C.M. Kornbluth; Additional dialogue : Mann Rubin	May 30, 1952	Exists
36	36	"The Exile"	Unknown	June 6, 1952	Missing
37	37	"All the Time in the World"	Arthur C Clarke	June 13, 1952	Exists, no closing credits
An unscrupulous P.I. is given an assignment to rob an art gallery, using a device that will stop time. With Don Hanmer, Esther Ralston, and Jack Warden.
38	38	"The Miraculous Serum"	Story by : Stanley G. Weinbaum; Teleplay by : Theodore Sturgeon	June 20, 1952	Exists
A serum which can cure animals of any disease is tried on a human subject. With Lola Albright.
39	39	"Appointment on Mars"	S.A. Lombino	June 27, 1952	Exists
A mission to Mars finds valuable minerals, but one of the astronauts becomes increasingly paranoid. With Leslie Nielsen.
40	40	"The Duplicates"	Richard M. Simon; Additional dialogue : Mann Rubin	July 4, 1952	Exists
A parallel world populated by duplicates of humanity is discovered, and one man is tasked with killing his duplicate to save both worlds. With Darren McGavin.
41	41	"Ahead of His Time"	Paul Tripp	July 18, 1952	Exists
In the year 2052, a scientist tries to send a message 100 years into the past to prevent the eventual destruction of mankind. Paul Tripp, who wrote the episode, also stars.
42	42	"Sudden Darkness"	Unknown	August 1, 1952	Missing
43	43	"Ice from Space"	E.H. Frank	August 8, 1952	Exists
A block of ice retrieved from outer space seems to freeze everything it contacts. With Paul Newman in a supporting role.

=== Season 2 (1952–53) ===
No. overall	No. in season	Title	Written by	Original release date	Episode status
44	1	"A Bird in Hand"	Unknown	August 22, 1952	
45	2	"Thanks"	Unknown	August 29, 1952	
46	3	"Seeing-Eye Surgeon"	Michael Blair	September 5, 1952	
A surgeon is given a very special pair of glasses. With Bruce Cabot.
47	4	"The Cocoon"	Unknown	September 12, 1952	
48	5	"The Chase"	Unknown	September 19, 1952	
49	6	"Youth on Tap"	Lona Kenney; Additional dialogue by : Mann Rubin	September 26, 1952	
A young man in financial difficulty is offered $1000 for a pint of his blood -- but there's a catch. With Robert Alda and Harry Townes.
50	7	"Substance X"	Frank De Felitta	October 3, 1952	
A woman is dispatched to figure out how a small, isolated southern town is surviving after their only sources of food are cut off. With Vicki Cummings and Will Kuluva.
51	8	"The Horn"	Alan Nelson	October 10, 1952	
An inventor develops a musical instrument that can convey -- and dictate -- human emotions. With Franchot Tone and Stephen Elliott.
52	9	"Double Trouble"	Unknown	October 17, 1952	
53	10	"Many Happy Returns"	Story by : Raymond Z. Gallun; Teleplay by : David Karp	October 24, 1952	
A father discovers his young son seems to be under the influence of a man from the Moon. With Gene Raymond.
54	11	"The Tomb of King Tarus"	Unknown	October 31, 1952	
55	12	"The Window (aka The Lost Planet)"	Frank De Felitta	November 7, 1952	
In this unusual meta-episode, a science fiction melodrama ("The Lost Planet") is interrupted by an unauthorized transmission of a peculiar drama called "The Window", and the real-life crew of Tales of Tomorrow try to figure out what's happening. With Rod Steiger.
56	13	"The Camera"	Unknown	November 14, 1952	
57	14	"The Quiet Lady"	Unknown	November 21, 1952	
58	15	"The Invigorating Air"	Unknown	November 28, 1952	
59	16	"The Glacier Giant"	Unknown	December 5, 1952	
60	17	"The Fatal Flower"	Unknown	December 12, 1952	
61	18	"The Machine"	Unknown	December 19, 1952	
62	19	"The Bitter Storm"	Armand Aulicino	December 26, 1952	
A scientist invents a machine that can retrieve sounds from the past. With Arnold Moss, and -- in her first credited role -- Joanne Woodward.
63	20	"The Mask of Medusa"	Unknown	January 2, 1953	
64	21	"Conqueror's Isle"	Unknown	January 9, 1953	
65	22	"Discovered Heart"	Unknown	January 16, 1953	
66	23	"The Picture of Dorian Gray"	Unknown	January 23, 1953	
67	24	"Two Faced"	Unknown	January 30, 1953	
68	25	"The Build Box"	Unknown	February 6, 1953	
69	26	"Another Chance"	Frank De Felitta	February 13, 1953	
A thief is given a chance to go back seven years and correct his mistakes, but it is harder than it seems. With Leslie Nielsen.
70	27	"The Great Silence"	Frank De Felitta	February 20, 1953	
A disease that paralyzes people's vocal cords is spreading rapidly. With Burgess Meredith.
71	28	"Lonesome Village"	Unknown	February 27, 1953	
72	29	"The Fury of the Cocoon"	Frank De Felitta	March 6, 1953	
A scientific expedition discovers a giant cocoon at the remote site of a meteorite crash. With Nancy Coleman and Peter Capell.
73	30	"The Squeeze Play"	Unknown	March 13, 1953	
74	31	"Read to Me Herr Doktor"	Alvin Sapinsley	March 20, 1953	
A professor with failing eyesight invents a robot to read books to him, to the concern of his daughter. With Everett Sloane and Mercedes McCambridge.
75	32	"Ghost Writer"	Mann Rubin	March 27, 1953	
A writer is hired to complete horrific tales which then seem to come true. With Leslie Nielsen and Murray Matheson.
76	33	"Past Tense"	Jack Weinstock & Willie Gilbert; Based on an idea by : Robert F. Levine	April 3, 1953	
A doctor uses a time machine to bring penicillin to the people of 1923, but finds it difficult to convince anyone of the drug's efficacy. With Boris Karloff and Robert F. Simon.
77	34	"Homecoming"	Mann Rubin	April 10, 1953	
An Air Force pilot can live only in sub-zero temperatures. With Brian Keith.
78	35	"The Rivals"	Unknown	April 17, 1953	
79	36	"Please Omit Flowers"	Unknown	April 24, 1953	
80	37	"The Evil Within"	Manya Starr	May 1, 1953	
A scientist's wife inadvertently drinks a serum designed to bring out evil. With Margaret Phillips, Rod Steiger, and James Dean.
81	38	"The Vault"	Unknown	May 8, 1953	
82	39	"Ink"	Unknown	May 15, 1953	
83	40	"The Spider's Web"	Frank De Felitta	May 22, 1953	
Castaways find themselves on an island inhabited by strange radiation-affected creatures.
84	41	"Lazarus Walks"	Unknown	May 29, 1953	
A dead man comes back to life with the ability to detect lies. With Olive Deering and Joseph Wiseman.
85	42	"What Dreams May Come"	Unknown	June 12, 1953	

== Radio series ==
While the television series was still being produced in 1953, ABC ran a radio show of the same name from January 1 to April 9, 1953. The radio series differed from the television series in that its scripts were adapted from stories appearing in Galaxy Science Fiction. Another radio series, Dimension X, had had a similar relationship with Astounding Science Fiction magazine.

The radio series was not successful. After only a few episodes, on February 26 it moved to CBS for the remainder of its 15-episode run. The TV version was canceled shortly afterward (the last episode was shown on June 12, 1953). A few years after its cancellation, the radio series X Minus One (a 1955 revival of Dimension X) debuted, again adapting stories published in Galaxy. Four of the fifteen Tales of Tomorrow stories were later adapted for X Minus One. These were "The Stars Are the Styx", "The Moon Is Green", "The Girls from Earth", and "The Old Die Rich".

== Surviving episodes ==
Most of the television episodes are in the United States public domain. Additionally, five of the surviving radio series episodes are now in the public domain in the United States and available for free download at Internet Archive. It was broadcast live and so the TV episodes were captured on kinescope. Of the 85 TOT episodes produced, around 40 have been released on various DVD sets, along with another handful on VHS, which for years was the only place to find "A Child Is Crying", one of the most memorable episodes of the series

== See also ==
- Captain Video and His Video Rangers, first science fiction adventure series in United States television. It was aimed at juvenile audiences.
- Out There, a 1951 anthology series.
- Science fiction on television, a look at the history of science fiction from various countries, and when they first appeared on television.
- Science Fiction Theatre, an anthology series released about three years later.
- Space Patrol, a science fiction adventure series that was being produced at the same time, aimed at juvenile audiences.
