= Pohlstars =

1984 collection by Frederik Pohl

Pohlstars is a collection by Frederik Pohl published in 1984.

== Plot summary ==
Pohlstars is a collection of 11 science fiction stories.

== Reception ==
Dave Langford reviewed Pohlstars for White Dwarf #75, and stated that "The mini-novel is strong on SF speculation [...] dodgy on 2020s corporate politics [...] good for storytelling, unconvincing in its final psychological twist. A mixed bag."

== Reviews ==
- Review by Dan Chow (1984) in Locus, #285 October 1984
- Review by Allan Jenoff (1985) in Fantasy Review, February 1985
- Review by Tom Easton (1985) in Analog Science Fiction/Science Fact, March 1985
- Review by Jim England (1986) in Vector 131
