= 4th World Science Fiction Convention =

4th Worldcon (1946)

Pacificon, the 4th World Science Fiction Convention
- Genre: Science fiction
- Dates: 4–7 July 1946
- Venue: Park View Manor
- Location: Los Angeles, California
- Country: United States
- Attendance: ~130

The 4th World Science Fiction Convention (Worldcon), also known as Pacificon I, was held on 4–7 July 1946 at the Park View Manor in Los Angeles, California, United States.

The convention chairman was Walter J. Daugherty.

This was the first time since 1941 that the otherwise annual event was held. The interruption was due to the Second World War.

== Participants ==
Attendance was approximately 130.

=== Guests of honor ===
- A. E. Van Vogt
- E. Mayne Hull

== Awards ==
=== 1946 Retro Hugo Awards ===
Hugo Awards were not presented, as the first ones were awarded in 1953. However, in 1996 at the 54th World Science Fiction Convention held in Anaheim, a set of Retro Hugo Awards were presented to honor work that would have been Hugo-eligible had the award existed in 1951:

- Best Novel: The Mule by Isaac Asimov (Astounding, November/December 1945)
- Best Novella: Animal Farm by George Orwell (Secker & Warburg)
- Best Novelette: "First Contact" by Murray Leinster (Astounding, May 1945)
- Best Short Story: "Uncommon Sense" by Hal Clement (Astounding, September 1945)
- Best Dramatic Presentation: The Picture of Dorian Gray
- Best Professional Editor: John W. Campbell, Jr.
- Best Professional Artist: Virgil Finlay
- Best Fanzine: Voice of the Imagi-Nation, edited by Forrest J Ackerman
- Best Fan Writer: Forrest J Ackerman
- Best Fan Artist: William Rotsler

== See also ==
- Hugo Award
- Science fiction
- Speculative fiction
- World Science Fiction Society
- Worldcon

Preceded by 3rd World Science Fiction Convention; Denvention I in Denver, Colorado, United States (1941)	List of Worldcons; 4th World Science Fiction Convention; Pacificon I in Los Angeles, California, United States (1946)	Succeeded by 5th World Science Fiction Convention; Philcon I in Philadelphia, Pennsylvania, United States (1947)
