= 12th World Science Fiction Convention =

12th Worldcon (1954)

SFCon, the 12th World Science Fiction Convention
- Genre: Science fiction
- Dates: 3–6 September 1954
- Venue: Sir Francis Drake Hotel
- Location: San Francisco, California
- Country: United States
- Attendance: ~700
- Filing status: non-profit

The 12th World Science Fiction Convention (Worldcon), also known as SFCon, was held on 3–6 September 1954 at the Sir Francis Drake Hotel in San Francisco, California, United States.

The chairmen were Lester Cole and Gary Nelson.

== Participants ==
Attendance was approximately 700. Amongst the first attendees was Philip K. Dick.

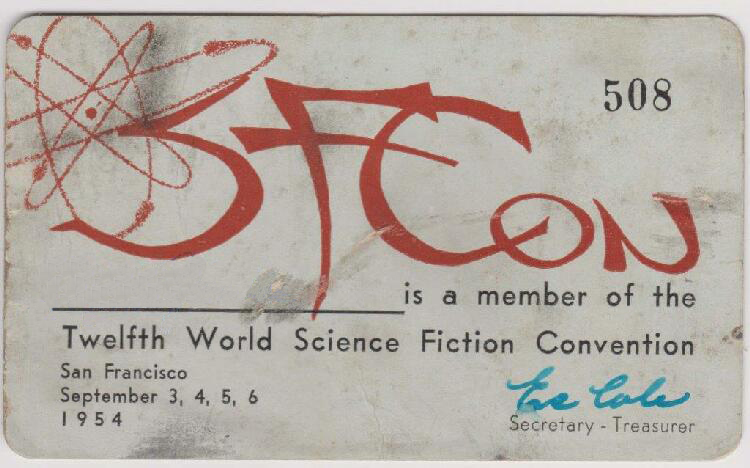
A membership card for the 12th World Science Fiction Convention, noting the dates as September 3rd through 6th, 1954.

=== Guests of honor ===
- John W. Campbell, Jr.

== Awards ==
=== 1954 Retro Hugo Awards ===
The previous Worldcon (the 11th) was the first one in which Hugo Awards were awarded. The 12th Worldcon did not continue the tradition, but since the next one (the 13th), Hugo Awards have been a permanent fixture of the conventions.

However, in 2004 at the 62nd World Science Fiction Convention held in Boston, a set of Retro Hugo Awards were presented to honor work that would have been Hugo-eligible had the awards been awarded in 1954:

- Best Novel: Fahrenheit 451, by Ray Bradbury
- Best Novella: "A Case of Conscience," by James Blish
- Best Novelette: "Earthman, Come Home," by James Blish
- Best Short Story: "The Nine Billion Names of God," by Arthur C. Clarke
- Best Related Book: Conquest of the Moon, by Wernher von Braun, Fred L. Whipple & Willy Ley
- Best Professional Editor: John W. Campbell, Jr.
- Best Professional Artist: Chesley Bonestell
- Best Dramatic Presentation: The War of the Worlds
- Best Fanzine: Slant, Walt Willis, editor; James White, art editor
- Best Fan Writer: Bob Tucker

== See also ==
- Hugo Award
- Science fiction
- Speculative fiction
- World Science Fiction Society
- Worldcon

Preceded by 11th World Science Fiction Convention; Philcon II in Philadelphia, Pennsylvania, United States (1953)	List of Worldcons; 12th World Science Fiction Convention; SFCon in San Francisco, California, United States (1954)	Succeeded by 13th World Science Fiction Convention; Clevention in Cleveland, Ohio, United States (1955)
