= 11th World Science Fiction Convention =

11th Worldcon (1953)

Philcon II, the 11th World Science Fiction Convention
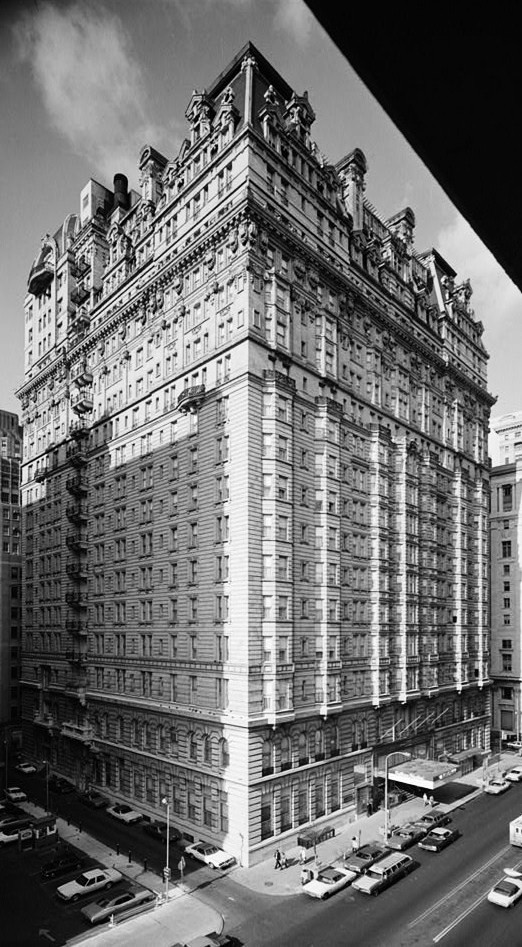
- The Bellevue Stratford Hotel in Philadelphia
- Genre: Science fiction
- Dates: September 5-7, 1953
- Venue: The Bellevue-Stratford Hotel
- Locations: Philadelphia, Pennsylvania
- Country: United States
- Attendance: ~750
- Filing status: non-profit

The 11th World Science Fiction Convention (Worldcon), also known as Philcon II, was held from September 5-7, 1953 at The Bellevue-Stratford Hotel in Philadelphia, Pennsylvania, United States. It was the first Worldcon to present the Hugo Awards.

The supporting organization was the Philadelphia Science Fiction Society. The chairman was Milton A. Rothman, replacing the late James A. Williams.

== Participants ==
Attendance was approximately 750.

=== Guests of honor ===
- Willy Ley
- Isaac Asimov (toastmaster)

== Awards ==
The World Science Fiction Society administers and presents the Hugo Awards, the oldest and most noteworthy award for science fiction. Selection of the recipients is by vote of the Worldcon members. Categories include novels and short fiction, artwork, dramatic presentations, and various professional and fandom activities.

Other awards may be presented at Worldcon at the discretion of the individual convention committee. This has often included the national SF awards of the host country, such as the Japanese Seiun Awards as part of Nippon 2007, and the Prix Aurora Awards as part of Anticipation in 2009. The Astounding Award for Best New Writer and the Sidewise Award, though not sponsored by the Worldcon, are usually presented, as well as the Chesley Awards, the Prometheus Award, and others. In 2021, the Nommo Awards began presenting at Worldcon.

=== 1953 Hugo Awards ===
This Worldcon was the first one that awarded Hugo Awards. The next one (the 12th) did not do so, but since the 13th, Hugo Awards have been a permanent fixture of Worldcons.

- Best Novel: The Demolished Man, by Alfred Bester (Galaxy January, February, March 1952; Shasta, 1951)
- Best Professional Magazine: (tie)
  - Astounding Science Fiction, edited by John W. Campbell, Jr.
  - Galaxy Science Fiction, edited by H. L. Gold
- Best Cover Artist: (tie)
  - Hannes Bok
  - Ed Emshwiller
- Best Interior Illustrator: Virgil Finlay
- Excellence in Fact Articles: Willy Ley
- Best New SF Author or Artist: Philip José Farmer
- #1 Fan Personality: Forrest J. Ackerman

== See also ==
- Hugo Award
- Science fiction
- Speculative fiction
- World Science Fiction Society
- Worldcon

Preceded by 10th World Science Fiction Convention; Chicon II in Chicago, Illinois, United States (1952)	List of Worldcons; 11th World Science Fiction Convention; Philcon II in Philadelphia, Pennsylvania, United States (1953)	Succeeded by 12th World Science Fiction Convention; SFCon in San Francisco, California, United States (1954)
