= Worlds of Tomorrow (magazine) =

American science fiction magazine (1963–1967)

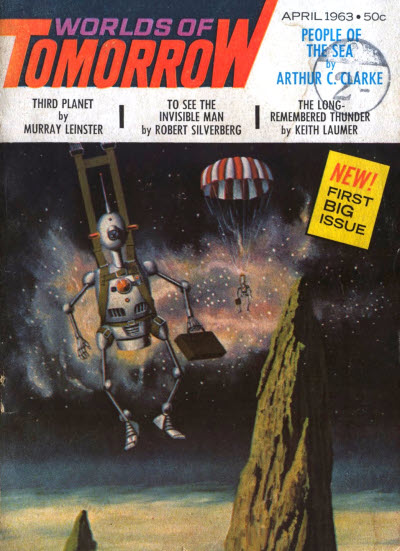
The first issue of Worlds of Tomorrow was cover-dated April 1963

Worlds of Tomorrow was an American science fiction magazine published from 1963 to 1967, at which point it was merged into If. The first issue appeared in April 1963. The last issue was published in May 1967. The publishers were Barmaray Co, New York City, and then Galaxy Publishing. It briefly resumed publication from Summer 1970 to Spring 1971, producing three issues. The magazine was edited in its first period of publication by Frederik Pohl, who was editor of Galaxy Publishing Co. from 1960-1969, and by Ejler Jakobsson in the second. It has published fiction by such noted authors as Arthur C. Clarke, Larry Niven, Fritz Leiber, Philip K. Dick, Brian W. Aldiss, Jack Williamson, Robert Silverberg, and Philip José Farmer. Pohl stated in 1967 that the magazine showed a loss of $15,000 (equivalent to $144,835 in 2025) during its first incarnation.
