= The Laws of Physics =

1963 book by Milton A. Rothman

The Laws of Physics (Science & Discovery)
- First UK edition
- Author: Milton A. Rothman
- Language: English
- Subject: Science
- Publisher: Basic Books Inc. (US); Pelican (UK)
- Publication date: 1963
- Publication place: United States
- Pages: 254 pp

The Laws of Physics (Science & Discovery) (ISBN 0-4650-3860-3) is a book by Milton A. Rothman, published in 1963. It describes some fundamental laws of physics in language that is both easy and pleasant to read.
