= 3rd World Science Fiction Convention =

3rd Worldcon (1941)

Denvention I, the 3rd World Science Fiction Convention
- Genre: Science fiction
- Dates: 4–6 July 1941
- Venue: Shirley-Savoy Hotel
- Location: Denver, Colorado
- Country: United States
- Attendance: 90

The 3rd World Science Fiction Convention (Worldcon), also known as Denvention I, was held on 4–6 July 1941 at the Shirley-Savoy Hotel in Denver, Colorado, United States.

== Guest of Honor ==
- Robert A. Heinlein, who gave a speech entitled "The Discovery of the Future"

== Participants ==
The convention was chaired by Olon F. Wiggins.

Attendance was 90.

This was the last Worldcon before a five-year break in the annual tradition due to World War II. The next one was held in 1946.

== Venue ==
The Shirley-Savoy Hotel. Savoy Hotel opened in 1904; Shirley Hotel opened in 1903; Hotels joined in 1919; Hotels razed in 1970.

== See also ==
- Hugo Award
- Science fiction
- Speculative fiction
- World Science Fiction Society
- Worldcon

Preceded by 2nd World Science Fiction Convention; Chicon I in Chicago, Illinois, United States (1940)	List of Worldcons; 3rd World Science Fiction Convention; Denvention I in Denver, Colorado, United States (1941)	Succeeded by 4th World Science Fiction Convention; Pacificon I in Los Angeles, California, United States (1946)
