= Futurians =

Group of science fiction fans

The Futurians were a group of science fiction fans, many of whom became editors and writers as well. The Futurians were based in New York City and were a major force in the development of science fiction writing and science fiction fandom in the years 1937–1945.

== Origins of the group ==
As described in Isaac Asimov's 1979 autobiography In Memory Yet Green, the Futurians spun off from the Greater New York Science Fiction Club (headed by Sam Moskowitz, later an influential sci-fi editor and historian) over ideological differences, with the Futurians wishing to take a more overtly Marxist political stance. Other sources indicate that Donald A. Wollheim was pushing for a more left-wing direction with a goal of leading fandom toward a political ideal, all of which Moskowitz resisted. As a result, Wollheim broke off from the Greater New York group and founded the Futurians in September, 1938. The fans following Moskowitz reorganized into the Queens Science Fiction Club.

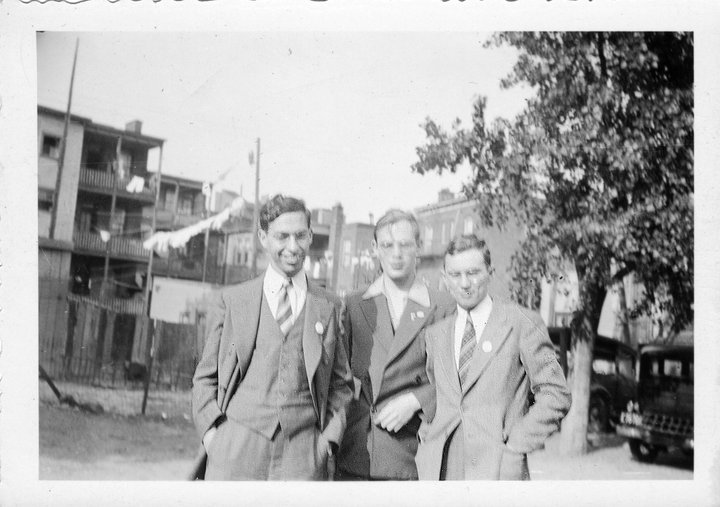
Donald A. Wollheim, Frederik Pohl and John Michel in 1938

Frederik Pohl, in his autobiography The Way the Future Was, said that the origin of the Futurians lay with the Science Fiction League founded by Hugo Gernsback in 1934, the local New York City chapter of which was called the "Brooklyn Science Fiction League," headed by G. G. Clark.

Wollheim, John Michel, and Robert A. W. Lowndes were also members of the Brooklyn Science Fiction League. Along with Pohl, the four started calling themselves the "Quadrumvirate". Pohl, commenting about that time, said "we four marched from Brooklyn to the sea, leaving a wide scar of burned out clubs behind us. We changed clubs the way Detroit changes tailfins, every year had a new one, and last year's was junk".

There were several club names during that period, before finally settling on the Futurians. In 1935 there was the East New York Science Fiction League, later the Independent League for Science Fiction. In 1936 came the International Cosmos Science Club, which also involved Will Sykora. Pohl then says that "on reflection 'Cosmos' seemed to take in a bit more territory than was justified, so we changed it to the International Scientific Association (it wasn't International either, but then it also wasn't scientific)". It was then renamed the New York Branch-International Scientific Association.

In 1937, after a falling-out with Will Sykora and others, the "Quadrumvirate" went on to found the Futurians. Sykora then founded the Queens Science Fiction League with Sam Moskowitz and James V. Taurasi. Later, the Queens Science Fiction League changed into New Fandom. Pohl said the New Fandom and the Futurians were "Addicted to Feuds", that "No CIA nor KGB ever wrestled so valiantly for the soul of an emerging nation as New Fandom and the Futurians did for science fiction".

Most of the group's members also had professional ambitions within science fiction and related fields, and collectively were very effective at achieving this goal, as the roster of members suggests. At one point in the earliest 1940s, approximately half of all the pulp sci-fi and fantasy magazines in the U.S. were being edited by Futurians: Frederik Pohl at the Popular Publications offshoot Fictioneers, Inc. (Astonishing Stories and Super-Science Stories); Robert Lowndes at Columbia Publications, most notably with Science Fiction and Future Fiction (though through the decade to come, Lowndes's responsibilities would expand to other types of fiction magazine in the chain), and Donald Wollheim at the very marginal Albing Publications with the short-lived, micro-budgeted Cosmic Stories and Stirring Science Stories (Wollheim soon moved on to Avon Books; Doë "Leslie Perri" Baumgardt also worked on a romance fiction title for Albing). Most of these projects had small editorial budgets, and relied in part, or occasionally entirely, on contributions from fellow Futurians for their contents.

== Political tendencies ==
At the time the Futurians were formed, Donald Wollheim was strongly attracted by communism and believed that followers of science fiction "should actively work for the realization of the scientific world-state as the only genuine justification for their activities and existence". It was to this end that Wollheim formed the Futurians, and many of its members were in some degree interested in the political applications of science fiction. Members of the Futurians, including Wollheim, Michel, Lowndes, and Cohen briefly became interested in Technocracy, a utopian movement led by Howard Scott, and attended a study course, although they later dismissed Scott as a "crackpot".

Hence the group included supporters of Trotskyism, like Judith Merril and others who would have been deemed far left for the era (Frederik Pohl became a member of the Communist Party in 1936, but quit in 1939).

Pohl, in his autobiography, The Way the Future Was, said Wollheim voted for Republican Presidential Candidate Alfred Landon in 1936.

== Members included ==
- Isaac Asimov
- Elise Balter (also known as Elsie Wollheim)
- James Blish
- Hannes Bok
- Daniel Burford
- Chester Cohen
- Rosalind Cohen (later Mrs. Dirk Wylie)
- Harry Dockweiler (also known as Dirk Wylie)
- Jack Gillespie
- Virginia Kidd
- Damon Knight
- Cyril Kornbluth
- Mary Byers (also known as Mary Kornbluth)
- Walter Kubilius
- David Kyle
- Herman Leventman
- Robert A. W. Lowndes
- Judith Merril
- John Michel
- Frederik Pohl
- Leslie Perri, a pseudonym of Doris "Doë" Baumgardt
- Jack Rubinson
- Larry Shaw
- Richard Wilson
- Donald A. Wollheim

== See also ==
- 1st World Science Fiction Convention
