= Anita Bahn =

American epidemiologist, biostatistician, and cancer researcher

- Born: Anita Kaplan; 1919/1920; New York City, US
- Died: July 19, 1980 (aged 60)
- Education: Hunter College; Johns Hopkins University
- Alma mater: Medical College of Pennsylvania
- Spouse(s): Ralph Bahn (his death); Milton A. Rothman (m. 1980; her death)
- Children: 2
- Scientific career
- Fields: Epidemiology; Biostatistics
- Workplaces: Perelman School of Medicine at the University of Pennsylvania
- Thesis: A Methodological Study of the Outpatient Psychiatric Clinic Population of Maryland, 1948-59 (1960)
- Doctoral advisor: Jerome Cornfield

Anita Kaplan Bahn (1919/1920 – July 19, 1980) was an American epidemiologist, biostatistician, and cancer researcher.

== Education and career ==
Bahn was originally from New York City. She left high school at the age of 15, and earned a bachelor's degree in biology four years later from Hunter College, together with a certification allowing her to teach high school biology. She would also go on to study "physics at New York City College; botany and bacteriology at Cornell University; mathematics and statistics at American University and at George Washington University", but without completing those programs to a graduate degree.

She became head of outpatient studies at the National Institute of Mental Health from 1951 to 1966. During this time, she earned a Sc.D. from Johns Hopkins University School of Hygiene and Public Health in 1960. Her dissertation, supervised by Jerome Cornfield, was A Methodological Study of the Outpatient Psychiatric Clinic Population of Maryland, 1948-59. She then returned to academia as an associate professor of biostatistics at the Medical College of Pennsylvania. While there, she worked towards an M.D., which she earned in 1972.

She became chief epidemiologist of Maryland for the following two years, and then became a professor of community medicine and epidemiology at the School of Medicine at the University of Pennsylvania. At Pennsylvania, she helped found a graduate program in epidemiology, and led a research center on the epidemiology of cancer. She was also affiliated with the Fox Chase Cancer Center and held an adjunct position at Temple University.

In 1980, she was recruited to head a new epidemiology program in the Graduate School of Public Health at San Diego State University, but she died at age 60 of a cerebral hemorrhage at the University of Pennsylvania hospital before she could take up her new position.

== Books ==
Bahn authored Basic Medical Statistics (Grune & Stratton, 1972). and, with Judith S. Mausner, she co-wrote Epidemiology: An Introductory Text (Saunders, 1974).

== Awards and honors ==
Bahn was named a Fellow of the American Statistical Association in 1970. She was also a fellow of the American Public Health Association and the American College of Preventive Medicine.

== Personal ==
Her husband, Ralph Bahn, with whom she had two children, died in the early 1970s; she married again, in 1980, the year of her death, to nuclear physicist and science fiction fan Milton A. Rothman.
