= Richard Wilson (author) =

U.S. novelist (1920–1987)

- Born: 23 September 1920
- Died: 29 March 1987
- Occupation: Writer
- Awards: Nebula Award for Best Novelette (Samuel R. Delany, Fritz Leiber, Mother to the World, 1969)

Richard Wilson (c. 1957)

Richard Wilson (23 September 1920 – 29 March 1987) was a U.S. science fiction writer and fan. He was a member of the Futurians, and was married for a time to Leslie Perri, who had also been a Futurian.

== Work ==
His books included the novels The Girls from Planet 5 (1955); 30-Day Wonder (1960); and And Then the Town Took Off (1960); and the collections Those Idiots from Earth (1957) and Time Out for Tomorrow (1962). His short stories included "The Eight Billion" (nominated for a Nebula Award as Best Short Story in 1965); "Mother to the World" (nominated for the Hugo for Best Novelette in 1969 and winner of the Nebula in 1968); and "The Story Writer" (nominated for the Nebula Award for Best Novella in 1979).

Wilson also worked in the public relations field as director of the Syracuse University News Bureau from 1964 to 1980. In 1980 he became the university's senior editor before retiring in 1982. He died 29 March 1987.

His other major contribution to science fiction and to Syracuse University was in successfully recruiting the donation of papers from many prominent science fiction writers to the university's George Arents Research Library. As part of this effort, Wilson wrote an article entitled "Syracuse University's Science Fiction Collections" for the May 1967 issue of the magazine Worlds of Tomorrow. The collection eventually included manuscripts, galley proofs, magazines, correspondence and art donated by Piers Anthony, Hal Clement, Keith Laumer, Larry Niven, Frederik Pohl and others, including Wilson himself. Initially housed in a warehouse annex, the papers eventually made their way to the climate-controlled top floor of Ernest Stevenson Bird Library on the Syracuse University campus. It has been called the "most important collection of science fiction manuscripts and papers in the world."

== Bibliography ==
=== Short stories ===
- "Retribution" (in Science Adventure Stories, October 1938)
- "Murder from Mars" (in Astonishing Stories, April 1940)
- "Stepsons of Mars" with C.M. Kornbluth (as Ivar Towers; in Astonishing Stories, April 1940)
- "The Hoaxters" (in Galaxy Science Fiction, 1952)
- "The Inhabited" (in Galaxy Science Fiction, 1952)
- "Love" (in The Magazine of Fantasy and Science Fiction, 1952)
- "Press Conference" (in Amazing Stories as "Visitor from the Void", 1953)
- "Don't Fence Me In" (in The Magazine of Fantasy and Science Fiction, 1956)
- "Honor" (in Science Fiction Quarterly, 1955)
- "Back to Julie" (in Galaxy, 1956)
- "It's Cold Outside" (in If, 1956)
- "Lonely Road" (in The Magazine of Fantasy and Science Fiction, 1956)
- "88 Beats 266" (in Fantastic Universe as "Success Story", 1956)
- "Those Idiots from Earth" (1957)
- "The Watcher in the Glade" (in Galaxy Science Fiction, 1964)
- "Harry Protagonist Brain-Drainer" (in Galaxy Science Fiction, 1965)
- "The Eight Billion" (in Fantasy Science Fiction, 1965)
- "They Hilariated When I Hyperspaced For Earth" (in Galaxy Science Fiction, 1967)
- "The South Waterford Rumple Club" (in Galaxy Science Fiction, 1967)
- "Mother to the World" (1968)
- "The Story Writer" (1979)

=== Novels ===
- The Girls from Planet 5 (1955)
- 30-Day Wonder (1960)
- And Then the Town Took Off (1960)

=== Collections ===
- Those Idiots from Earth (1957)
- Time Out for Tomorrow (1962)
