= Ejler Jakobsson =

American novelist

- Born: December 6, 1911; Finland
- Died: October 5, 1984 (aged 72); Pleasantville, New York

Ejler Jakobsson (December 6, 1911 – October 5, 1984) was an American science fiction editor.

Born in Finland, Jakobsson moved to the United States in 1926 and began a career as an author in the 1930s. He married Edith Kane (1915–1997) in 1935. He worked on Astonishing Stories and Super Science Stories briefly before they shut down production due to paper shortages. When Super Science Stories was revived in 1949, Jakobson was named editor until it ended publication two years later. He was an editor for Graphic Books in the 1950s. Jakobsson returned to editing in 1969, when he took over Galaxy and If, succeeding Frederik Pohl. He worked to make the magazines more contemporary with the help of Judy-Lynn del Rey and Lester del Rey. He left the magazines in 1974 and was succeeded by Jim Baen.

He died in Pleasantville, New York in 1984.
