= Leslie Perri =

American novelist

- Born: April 27, 1920; Brooklyn, New York
- Died: January 31, 1970 (aged 49)
- Occupations: Illustrator, writer
- Spouse(s): Frederik Pohl; Thomas Owens (painter); Richard Wilson

Leslie Perri (April 27, 1920 – January 31, 1970) was the pen name of Doris Marie Claire "Doë" Baumgardt, an American science fiction fan, writer, and illustrator. She was a member of the Futurians, the influential science fiction fan club.

== Personal life ==
Baumgardt was born in Brooklyn, New York to Fritz and Marie Baumgardt, German immigrants. Baumgardt was married to two fellow science fiction writers and Futurians, first to Frederik Pohl (1940–42), later to Richard Wilson (1951–65). She was also married to Thomas Llewellyn Owens (1944–?), an American painter. She had two children, Margot Owens, with Owens, and Richard David Wilson with Wilson. Her grandson, Dirk Llewellyn van der Meulen, is named for "Dirk Wylie" (Harry Dockweiler) the science fiction poet and member of the Futurians. Baumgardt died of cancer at the age of 49.

== Career ==
Baumgardt was introduced to the Futurians through Pohl, whom she was dating at the time. Baumgardt was also a founding member of the Fantasy Amateur Press Association. Baumgardt was one of five members of the Futurians allowed into the first World Science Fiction Convention in 1939 by Sam Moskowitz (the other four were Isaac Asimov, Richard Wilson, David Kyle, and Jack Robinson). While her pen name was "Leslie Perri", she was known to her friends as "Doë", pronounced "dough-ee".

In addition to her short fiction, she contributed both artwork and written pieces to a variety of fanzines such as Future Art, Futurian News, Le Vombiteur Literaire, Mind of Man, Mutant, and Fantasy Fictioneer. Through her Futurian connections, she also edited minor romance fiction magazines such as Movie Love Stories. While she was married to Wilson she became a reporter and journalist. Wilson was, at the time, the bureau chief for the Reuters wire service in New York City. He left Reuters and went on to Syracuse University, where he founded a science fiction works collection said to be one of the most important in the world.

== Short fiction ==
- "Space Episode," Future Combined with Science Fiction (December 1941)
- "In the Forest," If, James L. Quinn (editor) (September 1953)
- "Under the Skin," Infinity Science Fiction, Larry Shaw (editor) (June 1956)

=== Reprinting ===
"Space Episode" has been reprinted in:

- Frank, Janrae; Stine, Jean Marie; Ackerman, Forrest J. (1994). New Eves: Science Fiction About the Extraordinary Women of Today and Tomorrow. Samford, Connecticut: Longmeadow Press.
- Yaszek, Lisa; Sharp, Patrick B.; Goonan, Kathleen Ann, eds. (2016). Sisters of Tomorrow: The First Women of Science Fiction. Middletown, Connecticut: Wesleyan University Press.
- Yaszek, Lisa, ed. (2018). The Future is Female! A celebration of the women who made science fiction their own, from pulp pioneers to Ursula K. LeGuin. New York: Library of America.

"In the Forest" has been reprinted in:

- Arment, Chad, ed. (2016). Other Life: An Anthology of Non-Terrestrial Biology. Coachwhip Publications.
