= John Baltadonis =

- Born: February 7, 1921; Philadelphia, Pennsylvania
- Died: July 19, 1998 (aged 77)
- Known for: Artist, Fan, Publisher, Editor, Art Teacher

John V. Baltadonis (February 7, 1921 – July 19, 1998) was elected to First Fandom's Hall of Fame in 1998 for his early contributions to science fiction, including being a founding member of the Philadelphia Science Fiction Society.

== Career ==
John V. Baltadonis was a founding member of the Philadelphia Science Fiction Society (PSFS) and of the Fantasy Amateur Press Association (FAPA) in the 1930s.

As a 15 year old, he wrote, art directed, and published the first science fiction fan magazine in Philadelphia in October 1936 "Fantasy Fiction Telegram", using a process called hectography.

One of the most active fans of the 1930s, he was an amateur artist and served as art editor for the PSFS fanzine Imaginative Fiction. He also contributed art to other fanzines. At one time he was known as the “Paul of the fan artists.”

With others he co-edited the second version of the Science Fiction Collector, beginning in 1937. He published Fantasy Fiction Pictorial and Fantasy-Fiction Telegram. He was the last member of Comet Publications and invented Cosmic Monopoly. He attended the 1938 Philadelphia Conference, the Second Eastern States Science Fiction Convention, and Nylon.

He edited the "Science Fiction Collector" for 17 issues through 1941.

He fought in World War II in the Seventh Air Force and then taught art at Haverford High School in Pennsylvania for 35 years

He was elected to First Fandom Hall of Fame in 1998 and died the same year at the age of 77.

== Family ==
lived in Upper Darby, PA with his wife Patricia and sons, John and Steven.

footnote: his middle name stood for Vytautus, the name of a King from the 14th Century in Lithuania which is still a common male given name in Lithuania.
