= Philadelphia Science Fiction Society =

Science fiction fan club in Philadelphia, Pennsylvania, United States

Philadelphia Science Fiction Society (PSFS) is a science fiction club in Philadelphia, Pennsylvania. Established in 1936, PSFS is the second oldest extant group in science fiction fandom, and hosted what is considered by some to be the first science fiction convention. Anyone living in the greater Philadelphia area and interested in science fiction, fantasy, horror, whether written or on TV or in the movies; SF, fantasy, and horror art; gaming, board games or video games; comic books/graphic novels; and related arts is welcome.

The PSFS Constitution requires that a person must have attended three meetings before being voted into membership. The traditional club greeting for a person voted in is, "Pay your dues!" shouted in unison.

== History ==
PSFS was formed in October 1935 as a merger of the 11th chapter of the Science Fiction League (chartered the previous January by Milton A. Rothman), and the Boy's Science Fiction Club, founded at about the same time. It adopted its present name in early 1936. According to John Baltadonis (one of its founders), the new name was inspired by an illuminated sign saying "PSFS" on the Philadelphia Savings Fund Society's building. The idea was that the science fiction group could then claim that the building was its clubhouse. In 1944, it merged with another Philadelphia SF club, the Philadelphia Futurians, and retained the PSFS name.

PSFS meets monthly, usually on the second Friday of the month. Meeting usually have a guest speaker. The Annual meeting is held in January and sees the seven members of the PSFS Board (President, Vice President, Secretary, Treasurer, and three at-large members) report on their activities for the past year, and elections for new officers are held.

== Panel ==
Since 1981, the July meeting of the Society has featured the Hugo Panel. This panel is made up of five members and a varying number of alternates. Panel members and alternates read all the nominees for the Hugo Awards in the categories of Short Story, Novella, Novelette, Novel, and the long form and short form Dramatic Presentations. One panel member summarizes all the nominees in a category, with the other panelists commented after the summaries. All panelists then vote their preference for each nominee, ranking them and the traditional "No Award". Votes are averaged to get the rankings. The panel is usually held several days before the deadline for voting on the Hugos, and helps those PSFS members who are voting.

Each panel member and alternate also makes a recommendation for Best and Worst of all of the nominees. It is not uncommon for the same work to be nominated for both.

== Convention ==
PSFS hosts an annual science fiction convention, Philcon, in or near Philadelphia, usually in November. In 2006, the 70th anniversary Philcon was held at the Sheraton Philadelphia City Center Hotel. The first Philcon was held in 1936, making the convention the oldest science fiction convention in the world.

== Sponsorship ==
Since 1982, PSFS has sponsored the Philip K. Dick Award for "Best Original SF Paperback", which is awarded every year at Norwescon.

PSFS is incorporated as a 501(c)(3) non-profit organization.
