= 6th World Science Fiction Convention =

6th Worldcon (1948)

Torcon, the 6th World Science Fiction Convention
- Genre: Science fiction
- Dates: 3–5 July 1948
- Venue: Rai Purdy Studios
- Location: Toronto, Ontario
- Country: Canada
- Attendance: ~200

The 6th World Science Fiction Convention (Worldcon), also known as Torcon, was held on 3–5 July 1948 at Rai Purdy Studios in Toronto, Ontario, Canada. This was the first Worldcon held outside the United States.

The chairman was Ned McKeown.

== Participants ==
Attendance was approximately 200.

=== Guests of Honour ===
- Robert Bloch (pro)
- Bob Tucker (fan)

== See also ==
- Hugo Award
- Science fiction
- Speculative fiction
- World Science Fiction Society
- Worldcon

== See also ==
- World Science Fiction Society

Preceded by 5th World Science Fiction Convention; Philcon I in Philadelphia, Pennsylvania, United States (1947)	List of Worldcons; 6th World Science Fiction Convention; Torcon in Toronto, Ontario, Canada (1948)	Succeeded by 7th World Science Fiction Convention; Cinvention in Cincinnati, Ohio, United States (1949)
