= Milton A. Rothman =

American nuclear physicist

- Born: November 30, 1919; Philadelphia, Pennsylvania
- Died: October 6, 2001 (aged 81); Wyncote, Pennsylvania
- Occupations: Nuclear physicist, academic, science fiction fan, science fiction short story writer
- Spouse(s): Doris Weiss (m. 1950-1973; divorced); Anita K. Bahn (m. 1980; her death); Miriam Mednick (m. 1981-2001; his death)
- Children: 2
- Writing career
- Pen name: Lee Gregor
- Genre: Science fiction
- Notable works: Heavy Planet and Other Science Fiction Stories, The Laws of Physics

Milton A. Rothman (November 30, 1919 – October 6, 2001) was a United States nuclear physicist and college professor.

He was also an active science fiction fan and a co-founder of the Philadelphia Science Fiction Society. An occasional author as well, he published stories usually with the pseudonym "Lee Gregor".

== Biography ==
Rothman was born in Philadelphia, Pennsylvania, and attended Central High School. He attended the Philadelphia College of Pharmacy and Science (now University of the Sciences) from 1936 to 1938, where he majored in chemistry. From 1943 to 1944 he studied at Oregon State University, where he received a bachelor's degree in electrical engineering. He served in the U.S. Army from 1944 to 1946, becoming a sergeant in the Signal Corps. After the war Rothman returned to Philadelphia to study at the University of Pennsylvania, where he received an M.S. in 1948 and a Ph.D. in physics in 1952.

Rothman died at Wyncote, in 2001, of heart failure, from complications due to diabetes and Parkinson's disease.

His complete science fiction stories were published posthumously in 2004 by Wildside Press with the title Heavy Planet and Other Science Fiction Stories edited by Darrell Schweitzer and Lee Weinstein.

In 1950, Rothman married psychotherapist Doris Weiss, a marriage that ended in divorce in 1973. His second marriage was to epidemiologist Anita K. Bahn, who died in 1980, the year they officially married. The following year he married Miriam Mednick, a social worker, to whom he remained married until his death.

Milton Rothman's son is physicist and science fiction writer Tony Rothman. His daughter, Lynne Lyon, LCSW, is an Attachment Therapist, and founder of the Attach-China-International Parent's Network.

=== Professional career ===
After receiving his doctorate, Rothman had hoped to work at Oak Ridge National Laboratory, but was denied security clearance due to correspondence with fellow science-fiction fan and future mathematician Chandler Davis that had been intercepted by the FBI a dozen years earlier. As a result, he spent the next seven years investigating nuclear energy at the Bartol Research Foundation in Swarthmore, Pennsylvania. In 1959 he joined the newly created Princeton Plasma Physics Laboratory (formerly Project Matterhorn), which was concerned with creating controlled nuclear fusion. In 1963, while working in the laboratory, he wrote The Laws of Physics.

After leaving PPPL in 1969, Rothman joined the faculty at Trenton State College (now the College of New Jersey). He retired from teaching in 1979.

=== Fandom ===
Rothman was an active science fiction fan from an early age. Besides co-founding the Philadelphia Science Fiction Society, he also organized the first Philcon science fiction convention in October 1936. The event consisted of 9 people, including future science fiction author/editors Frederik Pohl and Donald A. Wollheim, and was held, in part, in Rothman's home.

It is often cited as the world's first science-fiction convention, although that is disputed. Rothman also published his fanzine Milty's Mag sporadically over a few years in the early forties. Later Rothman chaired the 1947 and 1953 Philcons. The first Hugo Award was presented at the 1953 Philcon. Rothman created the design based on illustrations in Chesley Bonestell's Conquest of Space and the actual awards were produced by machinist Jack McKnight. In honor of Dr. Rothman's lifetime of work in science fiction fandom, his name was voted into the First Fandom Hall of Fame in 1998.

=== Skepticism ===
Rothman was a member of the Committee for Skeptical Inquiry and published articles in the Skeptical Inquirer. In his book A Physicist's Guide to Skepticism (1988) Rothman applied the laws of physics to paranormal and pseudoscientific claims to show why they are, in fact, impossible. He wrote that proponents of pseudoscience like to claim "Anything's possible" but this claim is false as there are things which are logically impossible as they are self-contradictory and physically impossible because they violate well-established laws.

== Publications ==
- Plasma Physics (1962)
- The Laws of Physics (1963) ISBN 0-4650-3860-3
- Recent Events in Relativity (1965)
- Cybernetics: Machines that Make Decisions (1972)
- Discovering the Natural Laws: The Experimental Basis of Physics (1972) ISBN 0-486-26178-6
- A Physicist's Guide to Skepticism (1988) ISBN 0-87975-440-0
- The Science Gap: Dispelling the Myths and Understanding the Reality of Science (2003) ISBN 0-87975-710-8
- Heavy Planet and Other Science Fiction Stories by Milton Rothman, edited by Lee Weinstein and Darrell Schweitzer (2004)
