= Science Fiction League =

Organization of science fiction fans

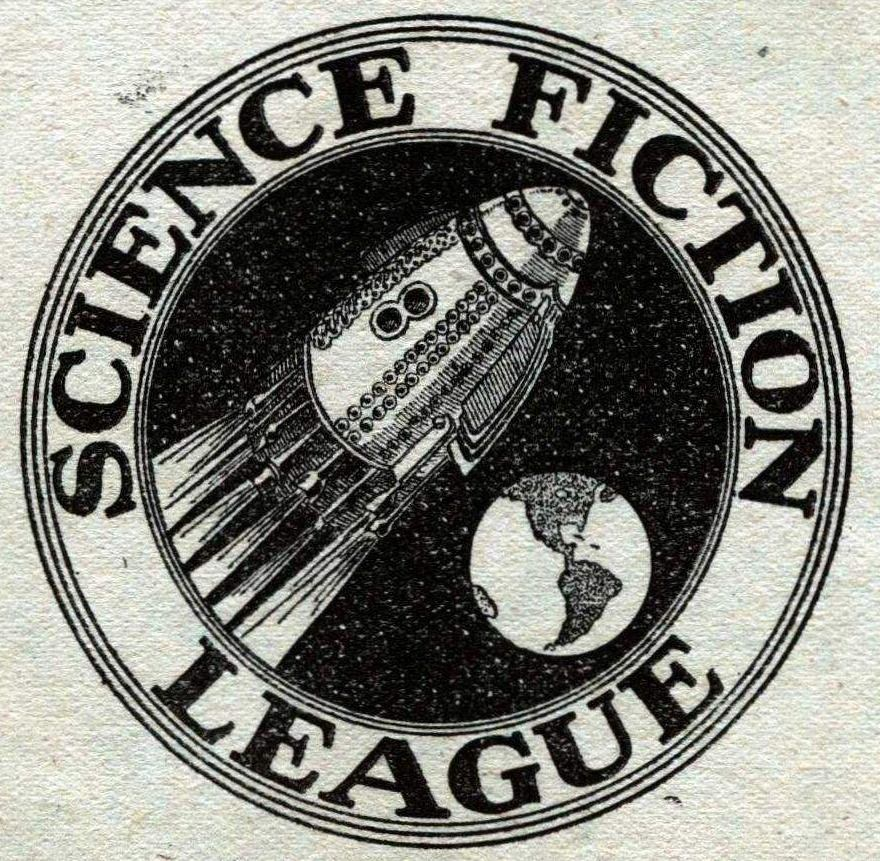
Science Fiction League logo, first published in the April 1934 Wonder Stories

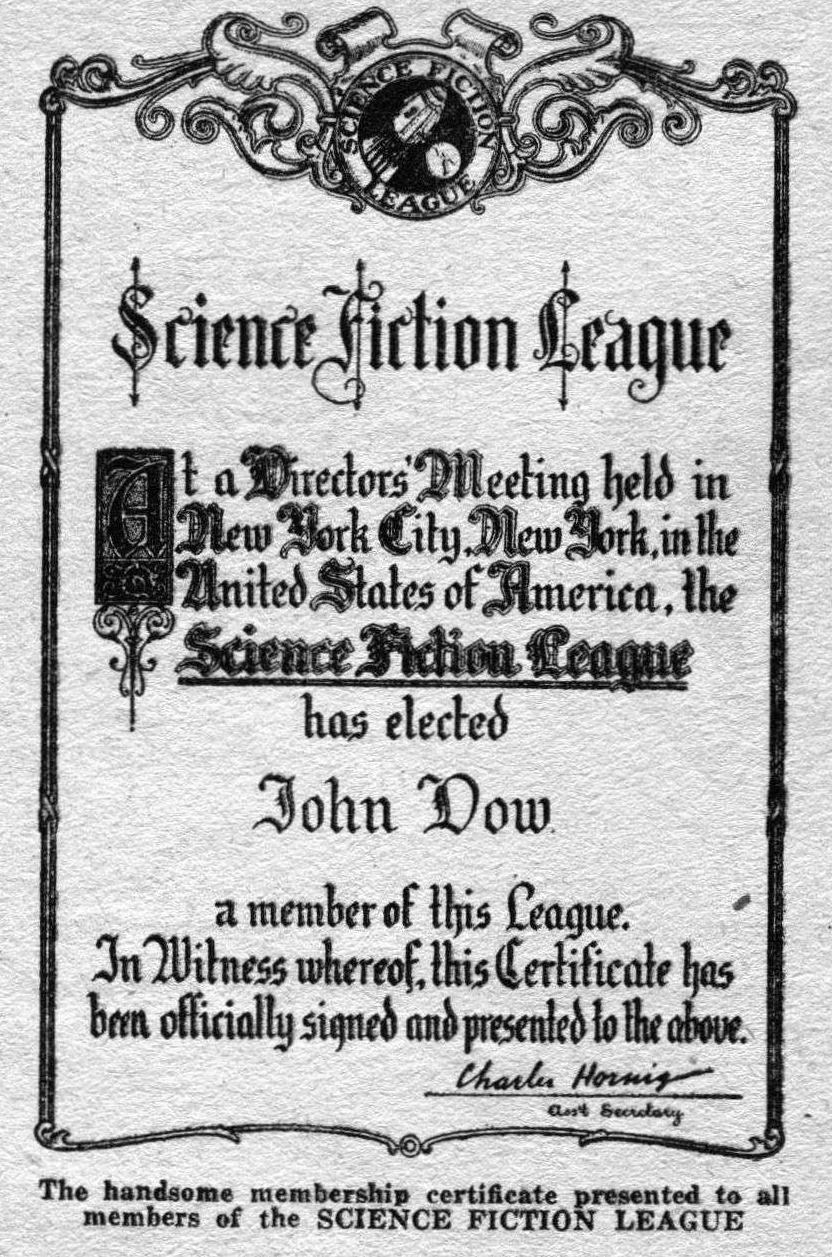
sample membership certificate

The Science Fiction League was one of the earliest associations formed by science fiction fans. It was created by Hugo Gernsback in February 1934 in the pages of Wonder Stories, an early science fiction pulp magazine. Gernsback was the League's "Executive Secretary", with Charles D. Hornig its "Assistant Secretary". The initial slate of "Executive Directors" included Forrest J. Ackerman, Eando Binder, Jack Darrow (Clifford Kornoelje), Edmond Hamilton, David H. Keller, P. Schuyler Miller, Clark Ashton Smith, and R. F. Starzl.

Gernsback intended for the magazine to promote fandom, much as his earlier "Radio League" had promoted interest in his radio and electrical hobby magazines. It was successful, and chapters were formed in the US, UK and Australia. Although the League was popular, with membership soon reaching about 1,000, it did not last long; in 1943 Sam Merwin, the editor of Thrilling Wonder Stories (the magazine had changed its name in 1936) dropped the organization when he took over the editorship. Frederik Pohl recalled that the League "changed a lot of lives. It filled a need" by helping fans meet each other, and reported that some chapters still existed 30 years later.

The Science Fiction League of America was a different organization of science fiction writers including Ted Sturgeon, Anthony Boucher, and Isaac Asimov, and associated with the television show Tales of Tomorrow.
