= Dynamic Science Stories =

US pulp science fiction magazine

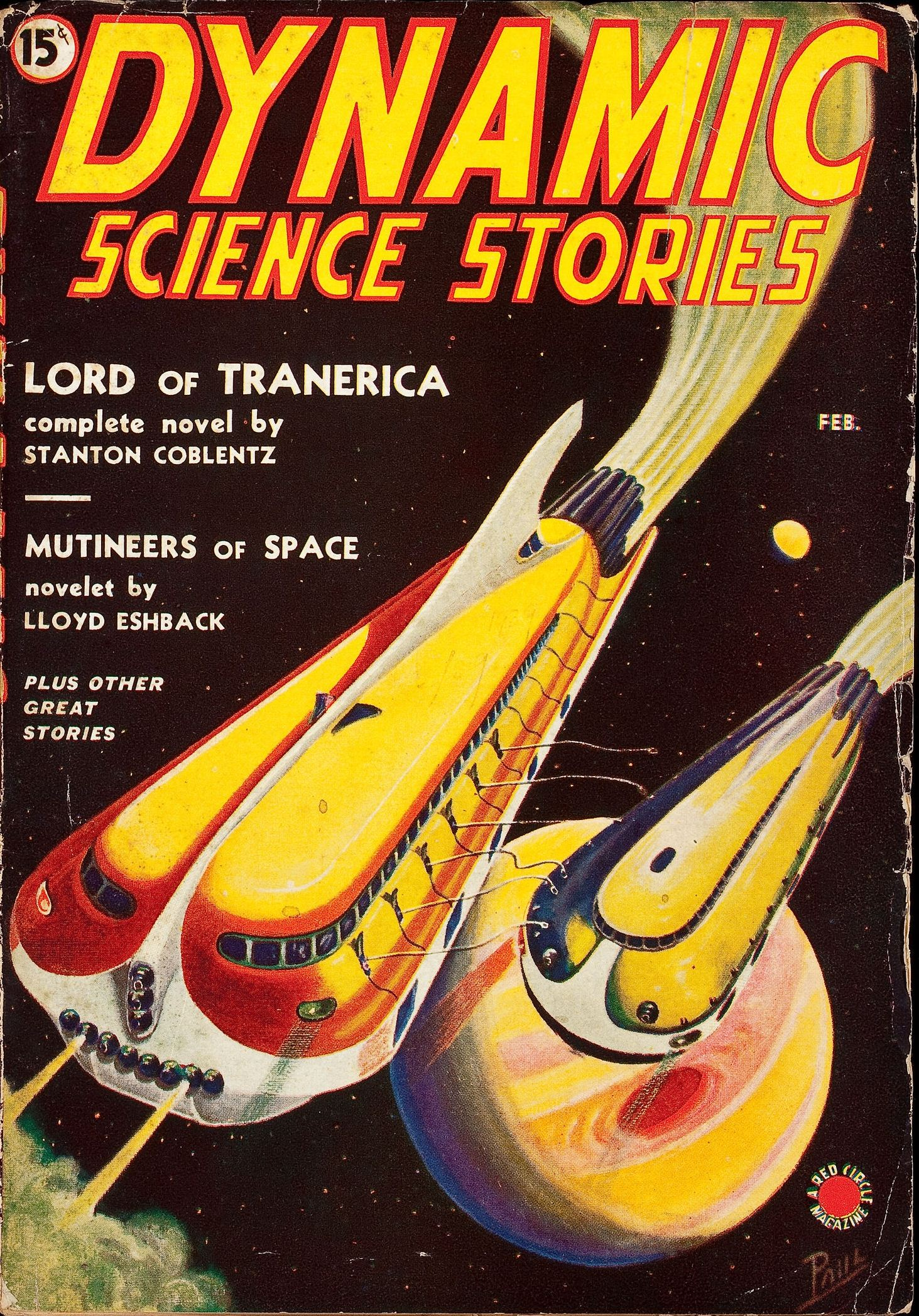
The February 1939 issue; cover by Frank R. Paul.

Dynamic Science Stories was an American pulp magazine which published two issues, dated February and April 1939. A companion to Marvel Science Stories, it was edited by Robert O. Erisman and published by Western Fiction Publishing. Among the better known authors who appeared in its pages were L. Sprague de Camp and Manly Wade Wellman.

== Publication history and contents ==
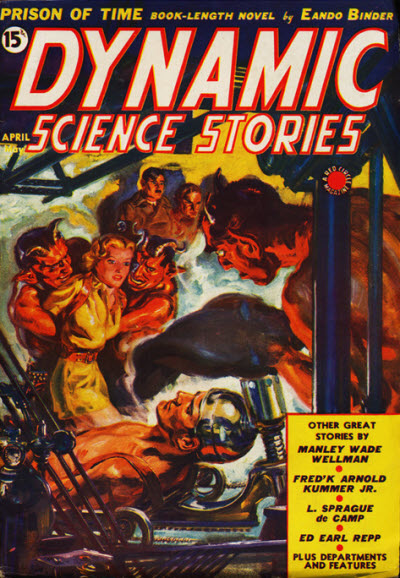
The April–May 1939 issue; cover by Norman Saunders

Although science fiction had been published before the 1920s, it did not begin to coalesce into a separately marketed genre until the appearance in 1926 of Amazing Stories, a pulp magazine published by Hugo Gernsback. By the end of the 1930s the field was booming. In 1938 Abraham and Martin Goodman, two brothers who owned a publishing company with multiple imprints, launched Marvel Science Stories, edited by Robert O. Erisman. In February of the following year they added Dynamic Science Stories as a companion magazine intended to run longer stories. The contents were typical pulp science fiction, with few memorable stories. Science fiction historians Joseph Marchesani and Mike Ashley identify only three stories of quality: Nelson S. Bond's "The Message from the Void" (published under the pseudonym "Hubert Mavity"); L. Sprague de Camp's "Ananias"; and Manly Wade Wellman's "Insight". The cover for the first issue was painted by Frank R. Paul, a popular cover artist recently returned to the science fiction field; Norman Saunders provided the second cover. Dynamic's sister magazine, Marvel Science Stories, often published stories with more sexual content than was usual for science fiction magazines of the day, but, although Dynamic's advertising included books offering sexual advice, the magazine's actual content was more traditional pulp material. The magazine only lasted two issues, though it is not known whether this was because of poor sales or if the cancellation was "a reflection of the whim of the publisher", in Ashley's words.

== Bibliographic details ==
The publisher of Dynamic Science Stories was Western Fiction Publishing Co., based in Chicago, with editorial offices in Radio City, New York. There was one volume of two numbers. Both issues were in pulp format, 112 pages long, and priced at 15 cents. There was a British reprint edition of the first issue; it appeared in 1939 and was undated. The editor of both issues was Robert O. Erisman, who was not credited in the magazine.

== Sources ==
- Ashley, Mike (2000). The Time Machines:The Story of the Science-Fiction Pulp Magazines from the beginning to 1950. Liverpool: Liverpool University Press. ISBN 0-85323-865-0.
- Edwards, Malcolm; Nicholls, Peter (1993). "SF magazines". In Clute, John; Nicholls, Peter (eds.). The Encyclopedia of Science Fiction. New York: St. Martin's Press, Inc. ISBN 0-312-09618-6.
- Lavine, Matthew (2008). Cultural History of Radiation and Radioactivity in the United States, 1895–1945. Madison WI. ISBN 978-0-549-63521-5.
- Marchesani, Joseph (1985a). "Dynamic Science Stories". In Tymn, Marshall B.; Ashley, Mike (eds.). Science Fiction, Fantasy, and Weird Fiction Magazines. Westport CT: Greenwood Press. pp. 198–199. ISBN 0-313-21221-X.
- Marchesani, Joseph (1985b). "Marvel Science Stories". In Tymn, Marshall B.; Ashley, Mike (eds.). Science Fiction, Fantasy, and Weird Fiction Magazines. Westport CT: Greenwood Press. pp. 398–401. ISBN 0-313-21221-X.
- Weinberg, Robert (1988). A Biographical Dictionary of Science Fiction and Fantasy Artists. Westport CT: Greenwood Press. ISBN 0-313-24349-2.
