= John B. Michel =

American novelist

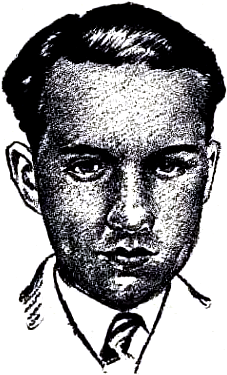
- John B. Michel aged ca. 15 in 1932
- Born: 1917; New York
- Died: 1969 (aged 51–52)
- Other name: Hugh Raymond
- Occupations: Author, editor

John B. Michel (1917–1969) was a science fiction author (sometimes publishing using the name Hugh Raymond) and editor associated with the informal literary society the Futurians, of which he was one of twelve initial members. He was elected director of the Futurians in 1941. He was known widely for his leftist, utopian politics, which came to be known among science fiction fans as "Michelism", or the belief that "science-fiction should by nature stand for all forces working for a more unified world, a more Utopian existence, the application of science to human happiness, and a saner outlook on life". Debates concerning Michelism and its association with technocracy and communism were an object of controversy in fanzines during the late 1930s, and its influence can be seen in much science fiction of the period, including Isaac Asimov's Foundation series.

Michel was a member of the Young Communist League and later joined the CPUSA, although he was asked to quit in 1949 for absenteeism.

During the early 1940s, Michel was briefly associated romantically with Judith Merril.
