= Frederik Pohl =

American science fiction writer and editor (1919–2013)

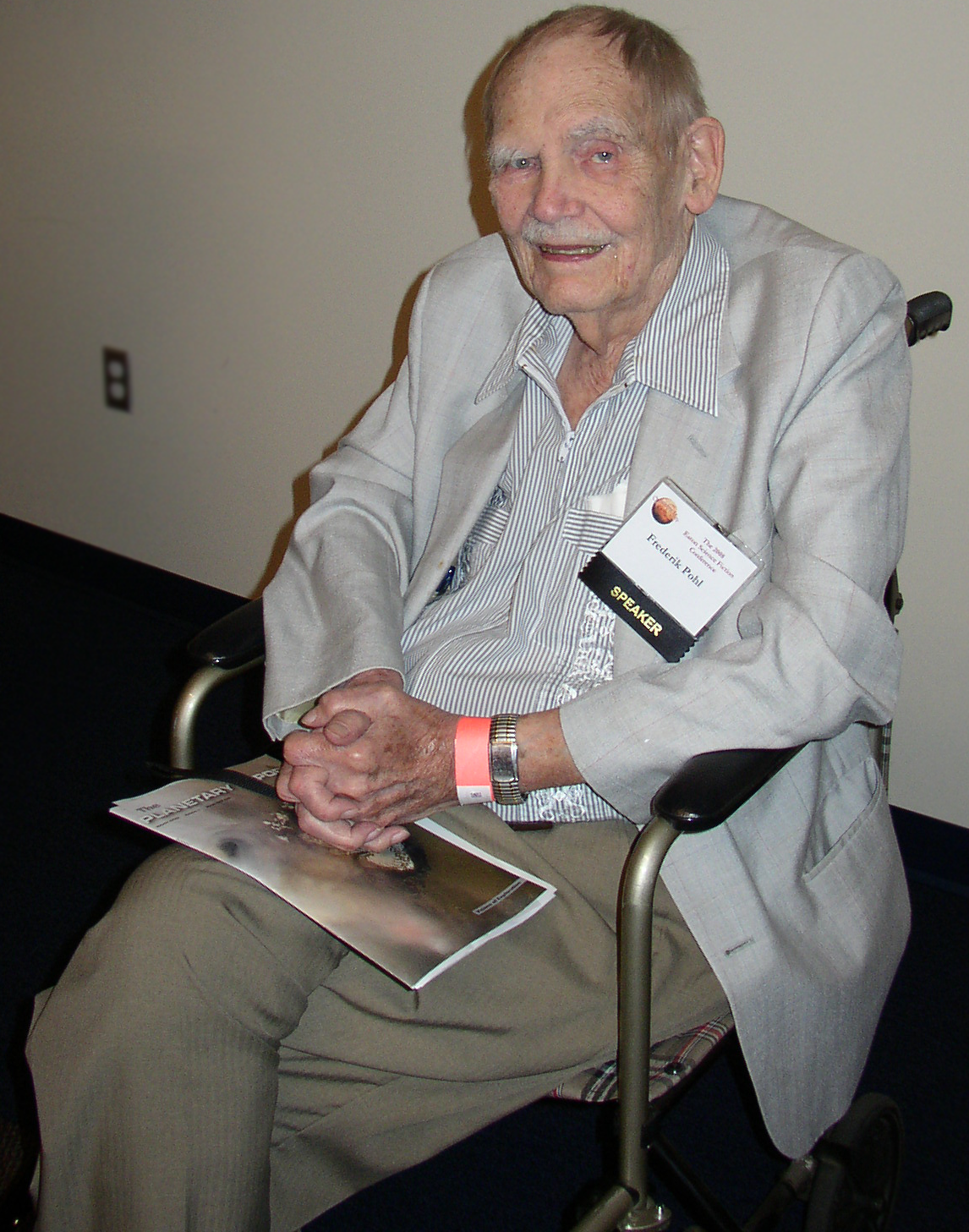
- Pohl in 2008 at the J. Lloyd Eaton Science Fiction Conference
- Born: Frederik George Pohl Jr. November 26, 1919; New York City, U.S.
- Died: September 2, 2013 (aged 93); Palatine, Illinois, U.S.
- Occupations: Novelist; short story author; essayist; publisher; editor; literary agent
- Writing career
- Pen name: Edson McCann, Jordan Park, Elton V. Andrews, Paul Fleur, Lee Gregor, Warren F. Howard, Scott Mariner, Ernst Mason, James MacCreigh, James McCreigh, Dirk Wilson, Donald Stacy
- Period: 1937–2011
- Genre: Science fiction
- Notable awards: Campbell Memorial Award; 1978, 1985 Hugo Award (novel); 1978; National Book Award; 1980 Nebula Award (novel); 1976, 1977
- Website: www.frederikpohl.com

Frederik George Pohl Jr. (/poʊl/; November 26, 1919 – September 2, 2013) was an American science-fiction writer, editor, and fan, with a career spanning nearly 75 years—from his first published work, the 1937 poem "Elegy to a Dead Satellite: Luna", to the 2011 novel All the Lives He Led.

From about 1959 until 1969, Pohl edited Galaxy and its sister magazine If; the latter won three successive annual Hugo Awards as the year's best professional magazine. His 1977 novel Gateway won four "year's best novel" awards: the Hugo voted by convention participants, the Locus voted by magazine subscribers, the Nebula voted by American science-fiction writers, and the juried academic John W. Campbell Memorial Award. He won the Campbell Memorial Award again for the 1984 collection of novellas The Years of the City, one of two repeat winners during the first 40 years. For his 1979 novel Jem, Pohl won a U.S. National Book Award in the one-year category Science Fiction, and it was a finalist for three other year's best novel awards. He won four Hugo and three Nebula Awards, including receiving both for the 1977 novel Gateway. He won the inaugural Locus Award for Best Non-fiction in 1979 for his autobiography The Way the Future Was.

The Science Fiction and Fantasy Writers of America named Pohl its 12th recipient of the Damon Knight Memorial Grand Master Award in 1993 and he was inducted by the Science Fiction and Fantasy Hall of Fame in 1998, its third class of two dead and two living writers. (Note: Among the living, Hal Clement and Pohl were preceded in the Hall of Fame by A. E. van Vogt and Jack Williamson, Arthur C. Clarke, and Andre Norton.)

Pohl won the Hugo Award for Best Fan Writer in 2010, for his blog, "The Way the Future Blogs".

== Early life and family ==
Pohl was the son of Frederik (originally Friedrich) George Pohl (a salesman of German descent) and Anna Jane Mason. Pohl Sr. held various jobs, and the Pohls lived in such far-flung locations as Texas, California, New Mexico, and the Panama Canal Zone. The family settled in Brooklyn when Pohl was around seven. He grew up in many different neighborhoods, including Crown Heights, Brooklyn Heights, and Flatbush.

He attended Brooklyn Technical High School, and dropped out at 17. In 2009, he was awarded an honorary diploma from Brooklyn Tech.

While a teenager, he co-founded the New York–based Futurians fan group, and began lifelong friendships with Donald Wollheim, Isaac Asimov, and others who would become important writers and editors. Pohl later said that other "friends came and went and were gone, [but] many of the ones I met through fandom were friends all their lives – Isaac, Damon Knight, Cyril Kornbluth, Dirk Wylie, [and] Dick Wilson. In fact, there are one or two – Jack Robins, Dave Kyle – whom I still count as friends, seventy-odd years later...." He published a science-fiction fanzine called Mind of Man.

In 1936, Pohl joined the Young Communist League because of its positions in support of unions and against racial prejudice, Adolf Hitler, and Benito Mussolini. He became president of the local Flatbush III Branch of the YCL in Brooklyn. Pohl said he left the YCL after Molotov–Ribbentrop Pact of 1939, when the communist position changed to partnership with Hitler.

During World War II, Pohl served in the United States Army from April 1943 until November 1945, rising to sergeant as an elite Air Corps weatherman. After training in Illinois, Oklahoma, and Colorado, he was mainly stationed in Italy with the 456th Bombardment Group.

== Career ==
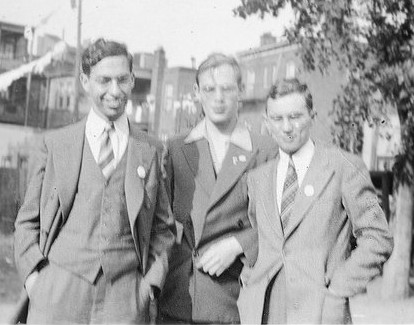
Frederik Pohl (center) with fellow scifi authors Donald A. Wollheim and John Michel in 1938

=== Early writing ===
Pohl began writing in the late 1930s, using pseudonyms for most of his early works. His first publication was the poem "Elegy to a Dead Satellite: Luna" under the name of Elton Andrews, in the October 1937 issue of Amazing Stories, edited by T. O'Conor Sloane. (Pohl asked readers 30 years later, "we would take it as a personal favor if no one ever looked it up".) His first story, the collaboration with C.M. Kornbluth "Before the Universe", appeared in 1940 under the pseudonym S.D. Gottesman.

=== Editor and agent ===
Pohl started a career as a literary agent in 1937, but it was a sideline for him until after World War II, when he began doing it full-time. Pohl stopped being Asimov's agent—the only one the latter ever had—when he became editor from 1939 to 1943 of two pulp magazines, Astonishing Stories and Super Science Stories. In his autobiography, Pohl said that he stopped editing the two magazines at roughly the time of the German invasion of the Soviet Union in 1941.

Stories by Pohl often appeared in these magazines, but never under his own name. Work written in collaboration with Cyril M. Kornbluth was credited to S. D. Gottesman or Scott Mariner; other collaborative work (with any combination of Kornbluth, Dirk Wylie, or Robert A. W. Lownes) was credited to Paul Dennis Lavond. For Pohl's solo work, stories were credited to James MacCreigh (or for one story only, Warren F. Howard.) Works by "Gottesman", "Lavond", and "MacCreigh" continued to appear in various science-fiction pulp magazines throughout the 1940s.

He also worked as an advertising copywriter and then as a copywriter and book editor for Popular Science.

Pohl co-founded the Hydra Club, a loose collection of science-fiction professionals and fans who met during the late 1940s and 1950s.

From the early 1960s until 1969, Pohl served as editor of Galaxy Science Fiction and Worlds of If magazines, taking over after the ailing H. L. Gold could no longer continue working "around the end of 1960". Under his leadership, If won the Hugo Award for Best Professional Magazine for 1966, 1967 and 1968. Pohl hired Judy-Lynn del Rey as his assistant editor at Galaxy and If. He also served as editor of Worlds of Tomorrow from its first issue in 1963 until it was merged into If in 1967.

In the mid-1970s, Pohl acquired and edited novels for Bantam Books, published as "A Frederik Pohl Selection"; these included Samuel R. Delany's Dhalgren, Sterling E. Lanier's Hiero's Journey, and Joanna Russ's The Female Man. He also edited a number of science-fiction anthologies.

=== Novelist ===
Though he retired his pen names "Gottesman", "Lavond", and "MacCreigh" by the early 1950s, Pohl still occasionally used pseudonyms, even after he began to publish work under his real name. These occasional pseudonyms, all of which date from the early 1950s to the early 1960s, included Charles Satterfield, Paul Flehr, Ernst Mason, Jordan Park (two collaborative novels with Kornbluth), and Edson McCann (one collaborative novel with Lester del Rey).

In the 1970s, Pohl re-emerged as a novel writer in his own right, with books such as Man Plus and the Heechee Saga series. He won back-to-back Nebula Awards with Man Plus in 1976 and Gateway, the first Heechee novel, in 1977. In 1978, Gateway swept the other two major novel honors, also winning the Hugo Award for Best Novel and John W. Campbell Memorial Award for the best science-fiction novel. Two of his stories have also earned him Hugo Awards: "The Meeting" (with Kornbluth) tied in 1973 and "Fermi and Frost" won in 1986. Another award-winning novel is Jem (1979), winner of the National Book Award.

His works include not only science fiction, but also articles for Playboy and Family Circle magazines and nonfiction books. For a time, he was the official authority for Encyclopædia Britannica on the subject of Emperor Tiberius. (He wrote a book on the subject of Tiberius, as "Ernst Mason".)

Some of his short stories take a satirical look at consumerism and advertising in the 1950s and 1960s: "The Wizards of Pung's Corners", where flashy, over-complex military hardware proved useless against farmers with shotguns, and "The Tunnel under the World", where an entire community of seeming-humans is held captive by advertising researchers. ("The Wizards of Pung's Corners" was freely translated into Chinese and then freely translated back into English as "The Wizard-Masters of Peng-Shi Angle" in the first edition of Pohlstars [1984]).

In his 1969 novel The Age of the Pussyfoot, Pohl speculated about a society where everyone could access knowledge and the means to communicate with others through a small handheld device similar to a smartphone. Although he set the novel 500 years in the future, he noted in an afterword that it might be as few as fifty years away. A short story "Day Million" suggested that society in the year 2737 might be as alien to us as contemporary society would be to someone from ancient times.

Pohl's Law is "Nothing is so good that somebody, somewhere will not hate it".

He was a frequent guest on Long John Nebel's radio show from the 1950s to the early 1970s, and an international lecturer.

Starting in 1995, when the Theodore Sturgeon Memorial Award became a juried award, Pohl served first with James Gunn and Judith Merril, and since then with several others until retiring in 2013. Pohl was associated with Gunn since the 1940s, becoming involved in 1975 with what later became Gunn's Center for the Study of Science Fiction at the University of Kansas. There, he presented many talks, recorded a discussion about "The Ideas in Science Fiction" in 1973 for the Literature of Science Fiction Lecture Series, and served the Intensive Institute on Science Fiction and Science Fiction Writing Workshop.

Pohl received the second annual J. W. Eaton Lifetime Achievement Award in Science Fiction from the University of California, Riverside Libraries at the 2009 Eaton Science Fiction Conference, "Extraordinary Voyages: Jules Verne and Beyond".

Pohl's work has been an influence on a wide variety of other science fiction writers, some of whom appear in the 2010 anthology, Gateways: Original New Stories Inspired by Frederik Pohl, edited by Elizabeth Anne Hull.

Pohl's last novel, All the Lives He Led, was released on April 12, 2011.

At the time of his death, he was working to finish a second volume of his autobiography The Way the Future Was (1979), along with an expanded version of the latter.

In July 2020, an academic description reported on the nature and rise of the "robot prosumer", derived from modern-day technology and related participatory culture, that, in turn, was substantially predicted earlier by science fiction writers, most notably by Pohl.

=== Collaborative work ===
In addition to his solo writings, Pohl was also well known for his collaborations, beginning with his first published story. Before and following the war, Pohl did a series of collaborations with his friend Cyril Kornbluth, including a large number of short stories and several novels, among them The Space Merchants, a dystopian satire of a world ruled by the advertising agencies.

In the mid-1950s, he began a long-running collaboration with Jack Williamson, eventually resulting in 10 collaborative novels over five decades.

Other collaborations included a novel with Lester Del Rey, Preferred Risk (1955). This novel was solicited for a contest by Galaxy–Simon & Schuster when the judges did not think any of the contest submissions was good enough to win their contest. It was published under the joint pseudonym Edson McCann. He also collaborated with Thomas T. Thomas on a sequel to his award-winning novel Man Plus. He wrote two short stories with Isaac Asimov in the 1940s, both published in 1950.

He finished a novel begun by Arthur C. Clarke, The Last Theorem, which was published on August 5, 2008.

== Personal life and death ==
Pohl was married five times. His first wife, Leslie Perri, was another Futurian; they were married in August 1940, and divorced in 1944. He then married Dorothy Les Tina in Paris in August 1945 while both were serving in the military in Europe; the marriage ended in 1947. During 1948, he married Judith Merril; they had a daughter, Ann. Pohl and Merril divorced in 1952. In 1953, he married Carol M. Ulf Stanton, with whom he had three children and collaborated on several books; they separated in 1977 and were divorced in 1983. From 1984 until his death, Pohl was married to science-fiction expert and academic Elizabeth Anne Hull.

He fathered four children – Ann (m. Walter Weary), Frederik III (born and died in 1954, aged one month), Frederik IV (a Los Angeles-based actor, writer, and producer), and Kathy. Grandchildren include Canadian writer Emily Pohl-Weary and chef Tobias Pohl-Weary.

From 1984 on, he lived in Palatine, Illinois, a suburb of Chicago. He was previously a longtime resident of Middletown, New Jersey.

Pohl went to the hospital in respiratory distress on the morning of September 2, 2013, and died that afternoon at the age of 93.

== Works ==
- Frederik Pohl bibliography
