= Kenneth S. Fagg =

American artist (1901–1980)

Kenneth S. Fagg (May 29, 1901 – January 7, 1980) was a twentieth-century American commercial artist, perhaps best known as a co-creator of the world's largest geophysical relief globe, exhibited at the 1958 Brussels World's Fair.

== Early life ==
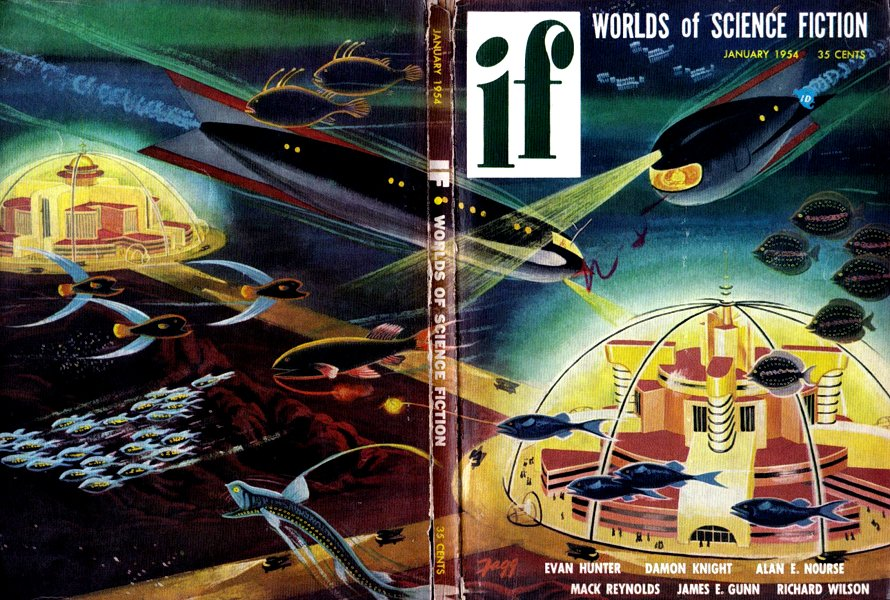
The New York Times praised Fagg's 1953 painting "An Undersea Civilization" for its "cheerfully colorful, cartoonish style".

Fagg was born in Chicago in 1901. He graduated from the University of Wisconsin. After graduation, he studied art at the Art Students League of New York. By the 1930s, Fagg had moved to Los Angeles and was working as an art director for 20th Century Fox. In the 1940s, he settled in Chappaqua, New York, and became a member of the First Congregational Church of Chappaqua.

== Career ==
Fagg became a commercial illustrator, working for several prominent New York advertising agencies and providing illustrations for national magazines including Life, Holiday, and the Saturday Evening Post. In the mid-1950s he spent time at Thule Air Base in Greenland, and took aerial photographs, later used in his art projects, on Arctic flights with the Northeast Air Command. He was a cofounder of Geo-Physical Maps, Inc., which became a unit of Rand-McNally, as well as a member of the Society of Illustrators and an exhibitor of the American Watercolor Society. Several of his paintings are included in the United States Air Force Art Collection.

Fagg may be best remembered today for his relatively brief stint providing painted covers for a 1950s science fiction magazine. Recruited by art director Ed Valigursky, he provided the newly published If magazine with a dozen cover paintings in just over two years, part of a run of "stunning covers for If which immediately began to raise its circulation", including "wrap-around covers which remain stunning to this day". He also provided covers for three novels in the Winston Science Fiction series. In 2001, a New York Times review of a retrospective exhibition of futuristic art singled out Fagg's cover painting for the January 1954 If, praising its depiction of "a glowing submarine metropolis under interconnected glass domes, painted in a cheerfully colorful, cartoonish style".

== Gallery ==
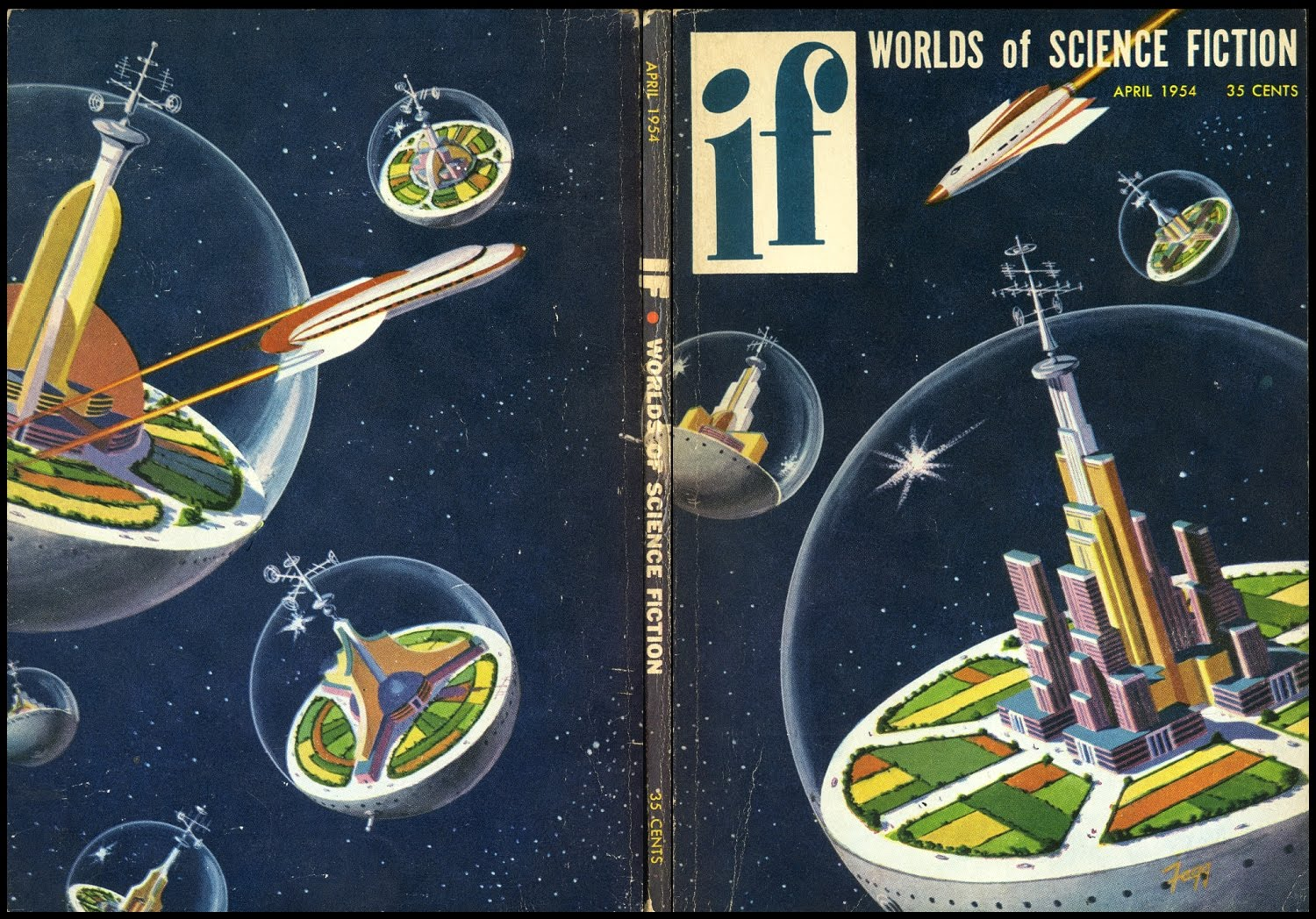

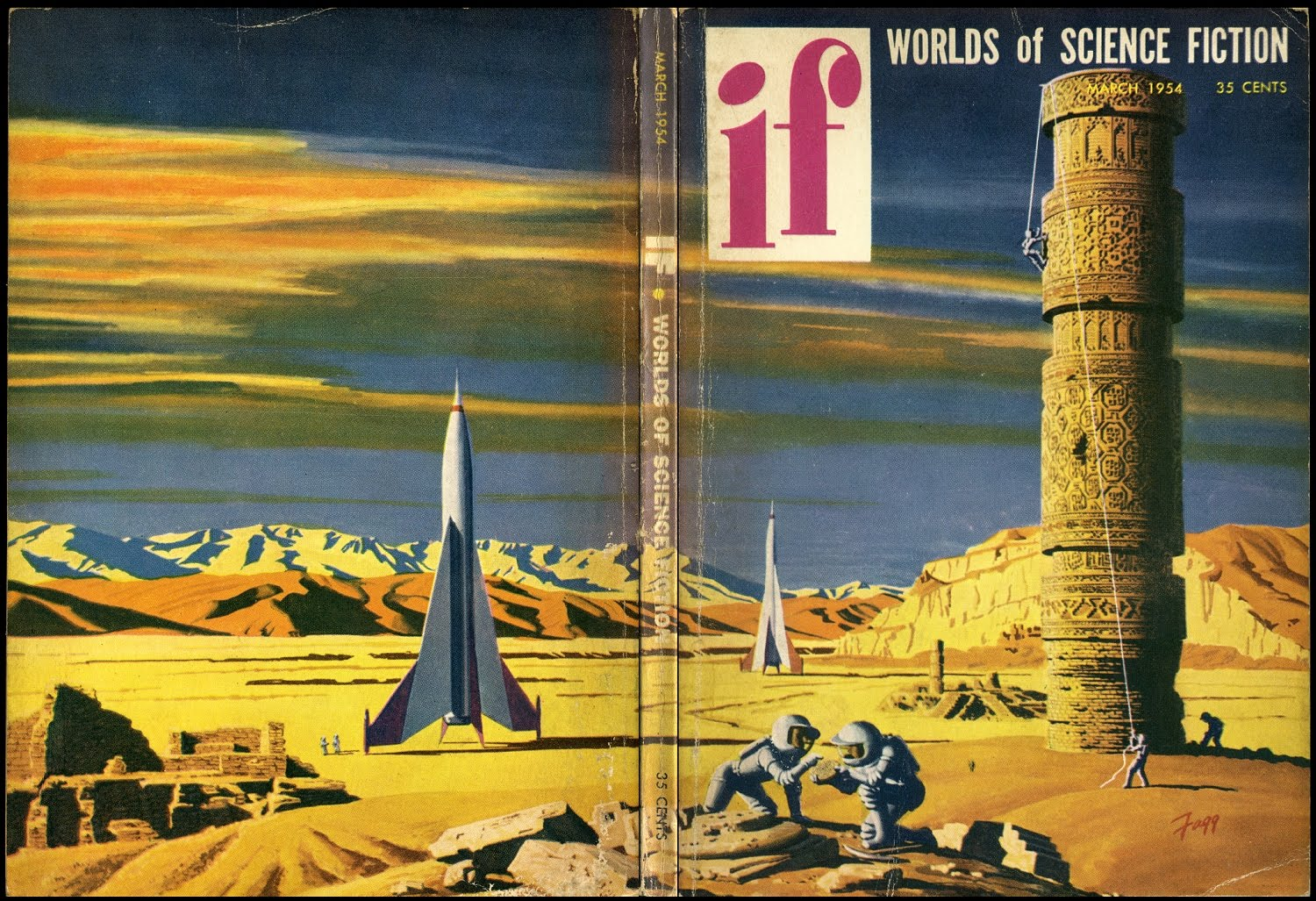

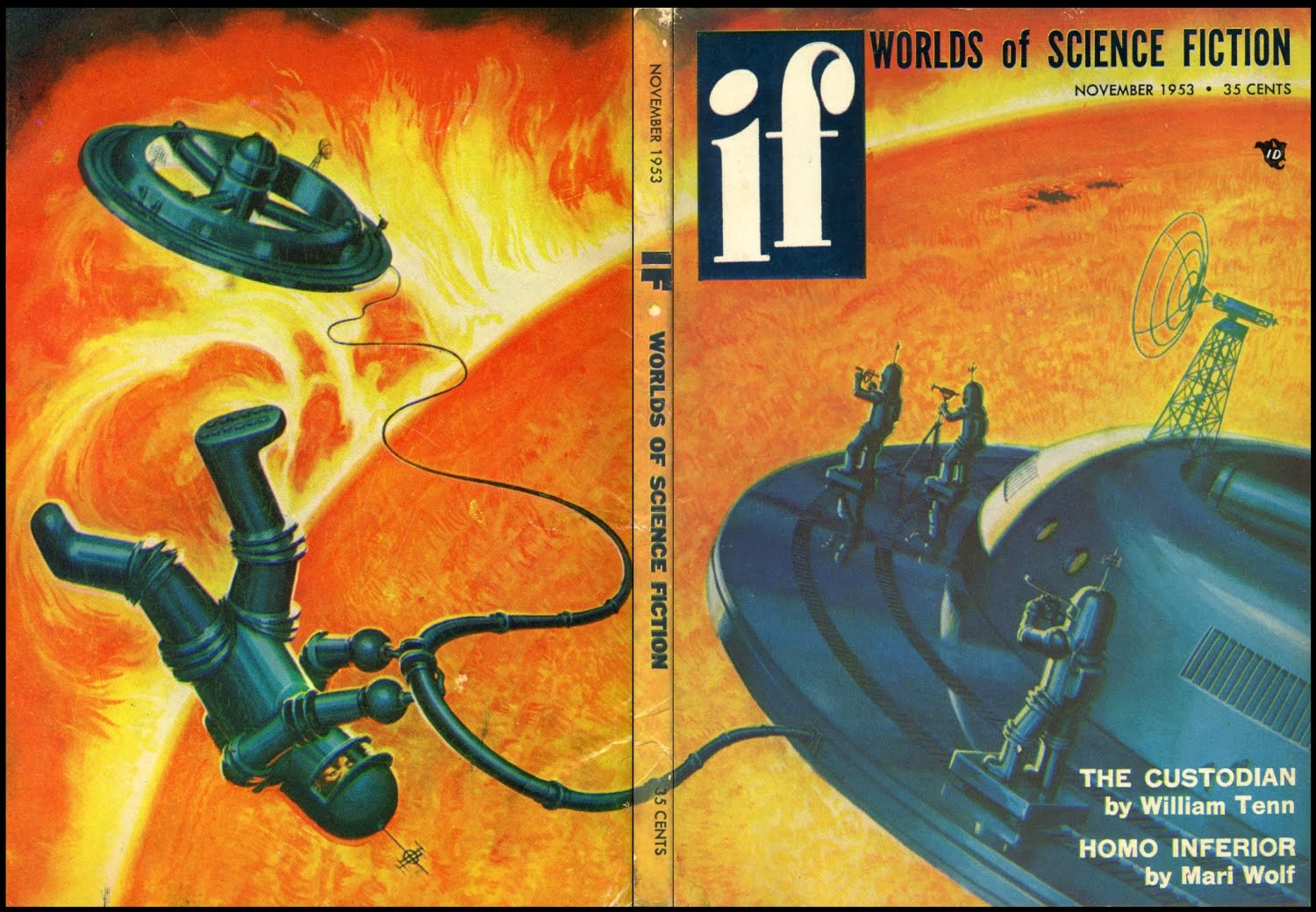
