= Trish Stewart =

American television actress

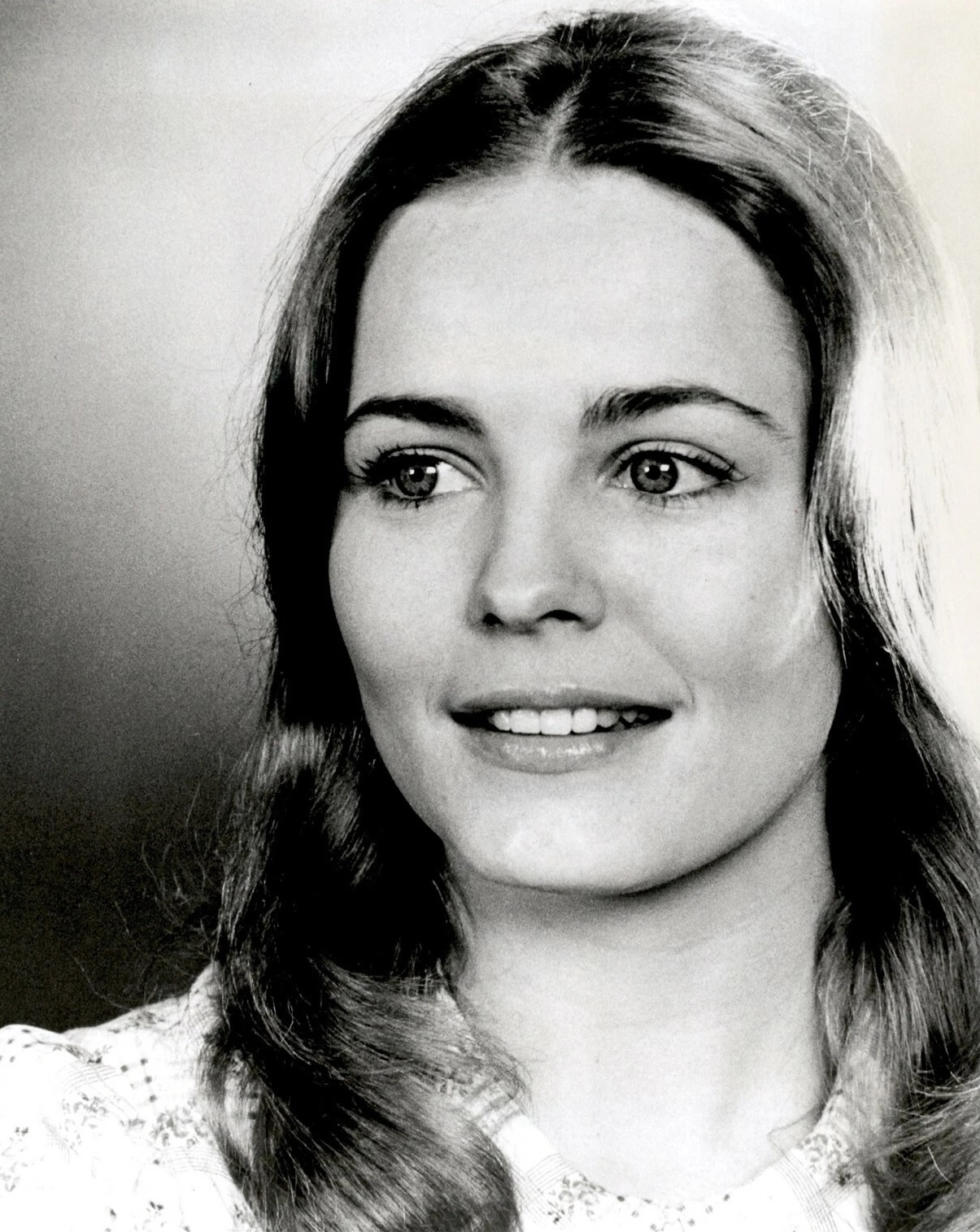
- Occupation: Actress
- Years active: 1972–1984

Trish Stewart is an American television actress. She is most recognized for her regular role as Chris Brooks Foster on the CBS soap The Young and the Restless. She was part of the premiere cast of the show and played the role for several years, reprising it for the last time in 1984.

She guest-starred in numerous television shows in the 1970s including Fantasy Island; The Love Boat; Trapper John, M.D.; Barnaby Jones; The Streets of San Francisco; Sword of Justice; Project U.F.O.; The Rookies; CHiPs and Most Wanted.

She was one of the three stars of the 1979 TV series Salvage 1. She appeared as herself on the Circus of the Stars and several times as a panelist on Match Game and Whew! In addition, she appeared in the 1980 TV miniseries Wild Times, and in the TV films Time Travelers (1976) and Breaking Up Is Hard to Do (1979). She also appeared as Richard Basehart's blind daughter in the 1976 horror movie Mansion of the Doomed.

As of 2008, she lives in Hot Springs, Arkansas.
