= James L. Quinn (editor) =

American science fiction editor and publisher

James Louis Quinn was an American science fiction editor and publisher.

Quinn was the founding publisher of the science fiction magazine If and, after Paul W. Fairman left shortly after its launch in 1952, became its editor as well as publisher until 1958. During his tenure, the magazine's circulation never sold as well as he'd hoped, even with the assistance of Larry Shaw and a short tenure by Damon Knight as editor of the magazine. After several issues edited by Knight failed to reverse the circulation slide (many sf magazines saw a drop in circulation after the 1957 launch of Sputnik, probably for a variety of reasons), Quinn sold the title to Robert Guinn, publisher of Galaxy, where it continued with H.L. Gold as the editor, with assistance from eventual editor Frederik Pohl.

Quinn continued primarily as a publisher of word-puzzle magazines into the 1970s; several of his titles continue to be published by Kappa Publishers Group (as of 2011). (If was merged with Galaxy in 1974, though there have been attempts to revive the title since then.)
