= Time Travelers (1976 film) =

1976 film directed by Alexander Singer

- Genre: Science fiction
- Written by: Rod Serling
- Screenplay by: Jackson Gillis
- Story by: Charles Willard Byrd
- Directed by: Alexander Singer
- Starring: Tom Hallick; Sam Groom
- Theme music composer: Morton Stevens
- Country of origin: United States
- Original language: English

Production
- Producer: Irwin Allen
- Production location: Los Angeles
- Cinematography: Fred Jackman, Jr.
- Editor: Bill Brame
- Running time: 78 minutes (TV broadcast)
- Production companies: Irwin Allen Productions; 20th Century Fox Television

Original release
- Network: ABC
- Release: March 19, 1976

Time Travelers is a 1976 science fiction film directed by Alexander Singer and starring Sam Groom, Tom Hallick, and Richard Basehart. The teleplay was credited to Jackson Gillis from a story by Rod Serling. The film was originally developed by Irwin Allen as the pilot for a prospective remake of the 1960s series The Time Tunnel, which ran only one season.

Due to litigation the pilot did not sell and was repackaged as a standalone television film. Charles Willard Byrd claimed that the story was based heavily on his unpublished 1959 book A Time To Live. Byrd and the producers reached a settlement that included modest monetary compensation and allowed Byrd to claim the original story as his work, although the title sequence was not reshot to reflect this.

The film depicts a viral outbreak in 1976 New Orleans. The symptoms match a viral outbreak in 1871 Chicago. The modern researchers need to consult the medical notes of the original outbreak, but those notes were destroyed in the 1871 Great Chicago Fire. Two researchers time travel to 1871 Chicago, and discover what treatment was used to stop the original outbreak.

== Plot ==
During a Mardi Gras parade in New Orleans, a girl becomes the latest victim of the deadly virus "XB". Dr. Clinton Earnshaw (Sam Groom) has been following the outbreak but only is able to diagnose it. The federal government assigns him Jeff Adams (Tom Hallick), who has no medical or scientific training. Though Earnshaw is initially bemused by the assignment, Adams' value emerges when he remembers the 19th century discovery of a virus with similar characteristics. Known at the time as "Wood's Fever", it was discovered by Dr. Joshua P. Henderson (Richard Basehart). Both men know that Henderson's notes were destroyed in the 1871 Great Chicago Fire, his only remaining artifact a gold pocket watch.

Adams introduces Earnshaw to a former NASA physicist and Nobel laureate, Dr. Amos Cummings (Booth Colman), and his colleague Dr. Helen Sanders (Francine York). The physicists have been experimenting with time travel and reveal their plan to send Earnshaw and Adams back in time to find Henderson's cure for Wood's Fever. After being outfitted with period gear, clothing, a small microscope and portable centrifuge, Earnshaw and Adams are briefed on the dangers of time travel. They step through a vault-like door into a room with a view of endless cloud-filled sky, and the process begins.

On arrival, they discover that the machine has placed them a day and a half later than expected in the center of Chicago, instead of near Henderson's home outside the city with three days to achieve their goal. Posing as doctors sent from Washington, DC, they find Henderson at his hospital and ask him about his success with the virus. Henderson confesses that he does not know why his patients are surviving. His treatment involves palliative drugs washed down with homemade elderberry wine. Adams and Earnshaw perform their own tests on Henderson's patients, but are equally baffled by their recovery. While trying to obtain a blood sample from one of the survivors, Adams initially thinks that he has killed the man but discovers that he had not been cured and would have died anyway. Their mission is further complicated when Earnshaw and Henderson's niece, Jane (Trish Stewart), fall in love. Earnshaw contracts the virus while working with Henderson's patients.

When the Great Fire breaks out, the travelers are no closer to the cure. Adams decides to take all of Henderson's paperwork and return to the future, but he is interrupted when a suspicious assistant enters the room. The assistant holds a telegram from Washington, responding to Henderson's cable of thanks with the information that Adams and Earnshaw were not sent by the government.

Earnshaw realizes a substance in Henderson's homemade wine is the cure; the only patients who succumbed were those who refused to take alcohol. The race is on to recover the last bottle of wine. They show Henderson the futuristic microscope and centrifuge and recite the inscription inside his pocket watch, convincing him that they are from the future. Despite knowing their fate, the Hendersons remain at the hospital with a trapped patient and perish in an explosion. The travelers return to the departure point with the wine just in time.

In 1976, Henderson's wine saves Earnshaw and also the girl stricken during Mardi Gras. After the success of their mission, Adams and Earnshaw visit the graves of Henderson and his niece in Chicago. They place a letter of thanks from the President on Henderson's grave. Earnshaw admits that in loving Jane he "fell in love with history".

== Cast ==
- Sam Groom as Dr. Clint Earnshaw
- Tom Hallick as Jeff Adams
- Francine York as Dr. Helen Sanders
- Richard Basehart as Dr. Joshua Henderson
- Trish Stewart as Jane Henderson
- Booth Colman as Dr. Amos Cummings
