= Tunnel Through Time =

1966 science fiction novel by Paul W. Fairman

- Author: Paul W. Fairman (as by Lester del Rey)
- Language: English
- Genre: Science fiction Time travel
- Publisher: Westminster Press
- Publication date: May 1966
- Publication place: United States
- ISBN: 978-0-664-32371-4

Tunnel Through Time is a 1966 science fiction novel written by Paul W. Fairman under American science fiction and fantasy author Lester del Rey's byline. It is a children's time travel adventure.

== Plot summary ==
The novel tells the story of a teen named Bob Miller whose scientist father, Sam Miller, has invented a "time ring", a circular device that allows time travel. Bob and his friend Pete travel through time in search of Pete's father ("Doc Tom", a paleontologist) who has disappeared while traveling alone. Beginning in the Mesozoic Era, Tom's planned destination, the story depicts various adventures while the travelers jump from point to point in Earth's prehistory; although they are able to locate the missing Dr. Tom Miller almost immediately upon arriving in the Mesozoic era, the time machine is unexpectedly damaged when a dinosaur runs into it. As a result, the three are unable to immediately travel directly forward through time to their present, and instead are forced to "hop" through different eras of prehistory until they finally arrive home.

== Literary significance and reception ==
This book was used in many elementary and middle school classrooms for reading and literature classes, and gained a notable popularity with its straightforward, dramatic writing style.

== Publishing history ==
The book was originally published in hardcover by Westminster Press in May 1966 and in paperback by Scholastic Corporation. It was reprinted several times, most recently in 1974.

== See also ==
- A Wrinkle in Time
- The Time Tunnel
