= If (magazine) =

American science-fiction magazine

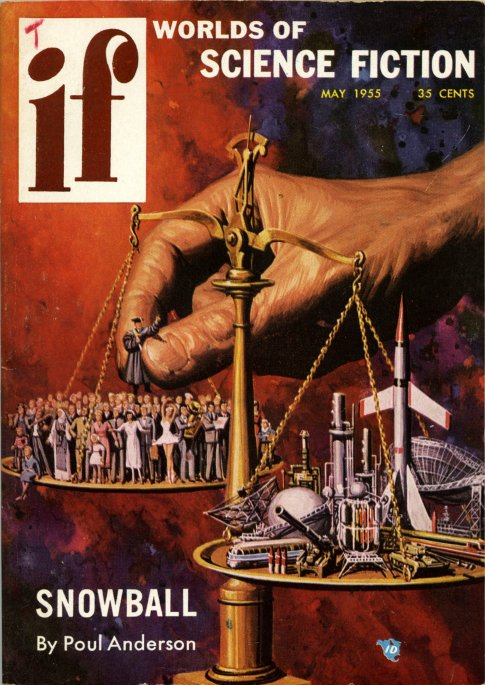
- May 1955 issue with cover art by Kenneth S. Fagg titled Technocracy Versus the Humanities.
- Categories: Science fiction
- First issue: March 1952
- Final issue: December 1974
- Country: United States

If was an American science fiction magazine launched in March 1952 by Quinn Publications, owned by James L. Quinn.

The magazine was moderately successful, though for most of its run it was not considered to be in the first tier of American science fiction magazines. It achieved its greatest success under editor Frederik Pohl, winning the Hugo Award for best professional magazine three years running from 1966 to 1968. If published many award-winning stories over its 22 years, including Robert A. Heinlein's novel The Moon Is a Harsh Mistress and Harlan Ellison's short story "I Have No Mouth and I Must Scream". The most prominent writer to make his first sale to If was Larry Niven, whose story "The Coldest Place" appeared in the December 1964 issue.

If was merged into Galaxy Science Fiction after the December 1974 issue, its 175th issue overall.

== Publication history ==
Although science fiction had been published in the United States before the 1920s, it did not begin to coalesce into a separately marketed genre until the appearance in 1926 of Amazing Stories, a pulp magazine published by Hugo Gernsback. By the end of the 1930s, the field was undergoing its first boom, but World War II and its attendant paper shortages led to the demise of several titles. By the late 1940s, the market began to recover. From a low of eight active magazines in 1946, the field expanded to 20 in 1950, and a further 22 had commenced publication by 1954. If was launched in the middle of this second publishing boom.

=== Origins and 1950s ===
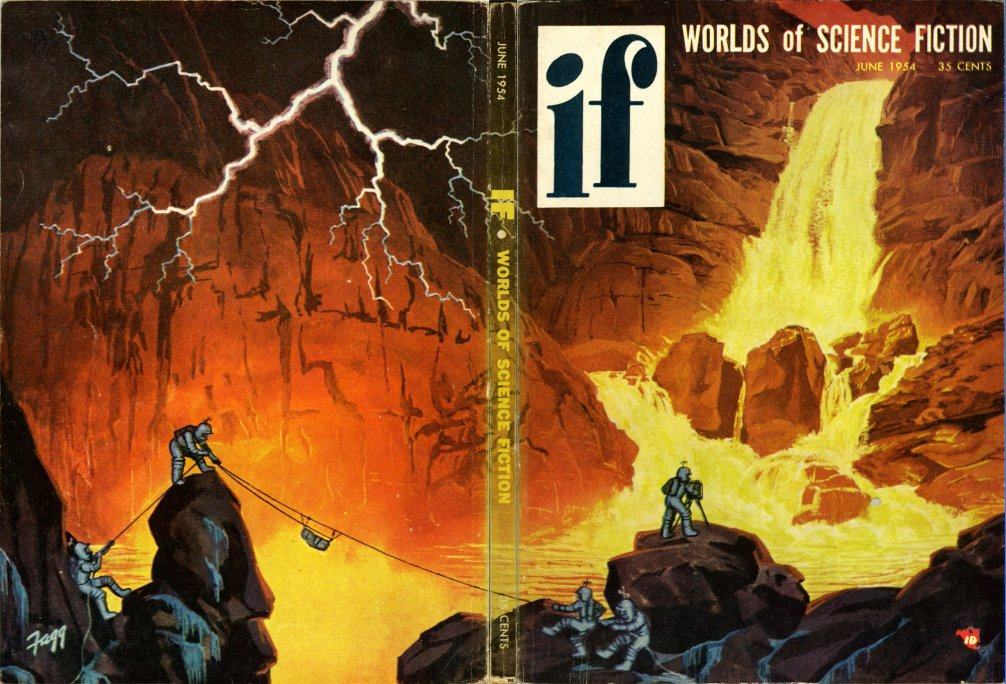
The June 1954 issue of If, featuring a wraparound cover by Kenneth S. Fagg, titled Lava Falls on Mercury

If's origins can be traced to 1948 and 1949, when Raymond Palmer founded two magazines while working at Ziff-Davis in Chicago: Fate and Other Worlds. Fate published articles about occult and supernatural events, while Other Worlds was a science fiction magazine. The two were sufficiently successful to attract the notice of James L. Quinn, a New York publisher. When Ziff-Davis moved to New York City in late 1950, Paul W. Fairman, a prolific writer, went with them, and was soon in touch with Quinn, who decided to found a pair of magazines modelled after Palmer's. One was a nonfiction magazine entitled Strange; the other was If.

The first issue of If was dated March 1952, with Fairman as editor; it featured stories by Richard Shaver, Raymond Palmer, and Howard Browne, all writers who were regulars of the Ziff-Davis magazines. By the time the third issue reached the news stands, the disappointing sales figures for the first issue were in, and Quinn decided to let Fairman go. Quinn persevered with himself as editor. His first issue was dated July 1952, and he continued as editor on the masthead for some years. Quinn brought in Ed Valigursky as the art editor; he designed striking covers, including some wraparound artwork—an unusual feature—which helped improve circulation. Quinn began searching for a replacement editor: writer Lester del Rey turned down the job (a decision he is reported to have later regretted), but Quinn was able to engage Larry T. Shaw, an active science fiction fan who had sold a few stories. Shaw joined in May 1953 as associate editor and soon began writing editorials (beginning with the September 1953 issue) and assisting with story selection. The magazine's quality quickly improved and soon Quinn felt able to switch to a monthly schedule, instead of bimonthly. Shaw left after only a year, and Quinn resumed full editorial responsibilities.

In late 1953, Quinn decided to run a competition for short fiction from new writers. The competition was only open to college students who had not sold a story before. The first prize was $1,000, the second prize $500, with five runner-up prizes of $100 each. Entries came in from writers who were later to become well known, including Harlan Ellison, Roger Zelazny, and Andrew J. Offutt, whose story "And Gone Tomorrow", about a man unexpectedly sent a hundred years into the future, won first prize and appeared in the December 1954 issue of If. The only other one of the seven announced winners who had a career as a science fiction writer was Leo P. Kelley. Quinn decided to move If to a monthly schedule with the March 1954 issue, perhaps because the competition had increased readership. It reverted to a bimonthly schedule with the June 1956 issue, as circulation dropped again.

In 1957, American News Company, by far the largest magazine distributor, was liquidated. Almost all the science fiction magazines had to find a new distributor, and the smaller independent companies remaining in the market often demanded monthly publication and a larger format from the magazines they took on. Many of the magazines did not have the advertising revenue required to support these changes, and within two or three years, many of them had disappeared: the number of science fiction magazines being published dropped from a high of 46 in 1953 to less than a dozen by the end of the decade. For a while If was hard to find on the news stands, but it survived. Quinn did try the slick format (using glossy paper, unlike the cheaper paper used for pulps and digests) for a companion magazine, Space Age, which he launched in November 1958; the experiment was unsuccessful, however. In an attempt to improve If's circulation, Quinn hired writer Damon Knight, whose first issue was October 1958. Circulation failed to increase, though this was at least partly due to the problems with distribution, and by early 1959, Quinn decided to sell the magazine. Knight's last issue was his third, dated February 1959.

=== Early 1960s ===
If's new owner was Robert Guinn, of Galaxy Publishing. The change of ownership was abrupt and led to a delay in publication, with the first issue under new editorship not appearing until July 1959. The editor was Horace Gold, who was also the editor of Galaxy Science Fiction; Galaxy had gone from a monthly to a bimonthly schedule at the start of 1959, and If and Galaxy appeared in alternate months for the next few years. In a 1975 retrospective article, Gold commented that his policy with If was to experiment, using new writers who had not yet established themselves. In the judgement of science fiction historian Mike Ashley, the effect was that If became the weaker of the two magazines, printing stories that were of lower quality than those Gold selected for Galaxy.

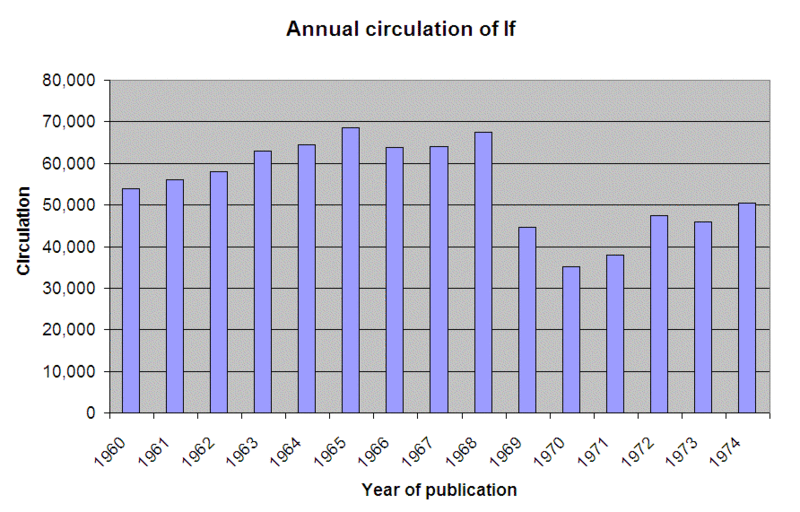
Annual circulation from 1960 to 1974

Frederik Pohl took over the editorship of both If and Galaxy in 1961. Gold had had a car accident with sufficiently severe health consequences to prevent him from being able to continue as editor. Pohl, who had been intermittently helping Gold with editorial duties for some time prior to the car accident, is first listed as editor of If on the masthead of the November 1961 issue, and as editor of Galaxy for the December 1961 issue, but he had been acting as editor of both magazines since at least midyear. Pohl paid one cent per word for the stories he bought for If, whereas Galaxy paid three cents per word, and like Gold, he regarded Galaxy as the leading magazine of the two, whereas If was somewhere he could work with new writers, and try experiments and whims. This developed into a selling point when a letter from a reader, Clayton Hamlin, prompted Pohl to declare that he would publish a new writer in every single issue of the magazine, though he was also able to attract well-known writers. When Pohl began his stint as editor, both magazines were operating at a loss; despite If's lower budget, Pohl found it more fun to edit, and commented that apparently the readers thought so, too; he was able to make If show a profit before Galaxy, adding, "What was fun for me seemed to be fun for them."

In April 1963, Galaxy Publishing brought out the first issue of Worlds of Tomorrow, another science fiction magazine, also edited by Pohl. The magazine published some well-received material and was profitable, but Guinn, the publisher and owner, decided in 1967 that it would be better to have Galaxy resume a monthly schedule; both Worlds of Tomorrow and Galaxy were bimonthly at that time, while If was monthly. With the August 1967 issue Worlds of Tomorrow was merged with If, though it was another year before Galaxy actually switched to a monthly schedule. By this time, If had become monthly again, starting with the July 1964 issue (though the schedule had an initial hiccup, omitting September 1964).

The circulation rose from 64,000 in 1965 to 67,000 in 1967; the modest 5% increase was exceeded only by Analog among the other science fiction magazines, and If won the Hugo Award for best professional SF magazine three years running during this period. However, in March 1969, Robert Guinn sold all four of his magazines, including Galaxy and If, to Arnold Abramson at Universal Publishing and Distribution Corporation (UPD). Pohl was in Rio de Janeiro when he heard the news, and decided to resign his position as editor rather than continue under the new management. He had been considering a return to a writing career for some time and the change in ownership precipitated his decision to leave.

=== Decline and merger with Galaxy ===
The new editor was Ejler Jakobsson, though Pohl continued to be listed as editor emeritus on the masthead until the July–August 1970 issue. Much of the editorial work was actually done by Judy-Lynn Benjamin, who was hired by Pohl in 1969 as an editorial assistant. The new regime failed to impress readers, and circulation dropped from over 67,000 for the year ending October 1968 to under 45,000 the following year, a drop of over 30%. If went bimonthly in May 1970, as Abramson attempted to juggle the frequency of publication of several of his titles to maximize profits; the page count and price were also adjusted more than once over the next year, again increasing profitability. Abramson also began a British distribution of If, reprinted with a separate cover, priced in British currency. Circulation figures of the time show an increase of about 6,000 copies, but if this includes sales in the UK is not clear.

In May 1973, Judy-Lynn Benjamin (Judy-Lynn del Rey since her 1971 marriage to Lester del Rey) resigned. She was briefly replaced by Albert Dytch, but within four months, Dytch in turn left, and in August 1973, James Baen joined UPD. He was made managing editor of If with effect from the January 1974 issue, and full editor one issue later; Jakobsson was listed as editor emeritus until the August 1974 issue. Baen had little opportunity to work with If, however, as financial problems at UPD combined with the increasing cost of paper (a consequence of the rising price of oil) led to a decision to combine If with Galaxy. Despite the fact that in 1974, If's circulation had exceeded Galaxy's for the first time, Galaxy was retained and If was merged with it beginning with the January 1975 issue.

=== Relaunches of the magazine ===
In 1986, an attempt was made to revive If as a semiprofessional magazine. The only issue, dated September–October 1986, was edited by Clifford Hong.

Worlds of IF was relaunched again in February 2024 by Starship Sloane Publishing, with Justin T. O'Conor Sloane as editor, Jean-Paul L. Garnier as deputy editor, Daniel Pomarède as science editor, and Robert Silverberg as a contributing editor. The first issue featured cover art by Bob Eggleton, with reprinted fiction by Silverberg and David Brin among other notables.

== Contents and reception ==
	Jan	Feb	Mar	Apr	May	Jun	Jul	Aug	Sep	Oct	Nov	Dec
1952			1/1		1/2		1/3		1/4		1/5	
1953	1/6		2/1		2/2		2/3		2/4		2/5	
1954	2/6		3/1	3/2	3/3	3/4	3/5	3/6	4/1	4/2	4/3	4/4
1955	4/5	4/6	5/1	5/2	5/3	5/4		5/5		5/6		6/1
1956		6/2		6/3		6/4		6/5		6/6		7/1
1957		7/2		7/3		7/4		7/5		7/6		8/1
1958		8/2		8/3		8/4		8/5		8/6		9/1
1959		9/2					8/6		9/4		9/5	
1960	9/6		10/1		10/2		10/3		10/4		10/5	
1961	10/6		11/1		11/2		11/3		11/4		11/5	
Issues of If from 1952 to 1961, showing volume/issue number. Editors were Paul W. Fairman (yellow), James L. Quinn (blue), Larry T. Shaw (pink), Quinn again (blue), Damon Knight (purple) and H. L. Gold (green).

The first issue of If, dated March 1952, went on sale on 7 January of that year. The lead story was Howard Browne's "Twelve Times Zero", a murder mystery with a science fictional resolution; other stories were from Ray Palmer, Richard Shaver, and Rog Phillips, all writers associated with the Ziff-Davis magazines. Browne was the editor of Ziff-Davis's Amazing Science Fiction, a leading magazine of the time, and had given Fairman his start in the field in the late 1940s. Fairman was familiar with Ziff-Davis's stable of writers, and his preference for them was a reflection of his experience, though this did not necessarily serve the magazine well—he referred to the acquisition of Browne's story as "the scoop of the century" and spoke in glowing terms of him in an introductory note despite the fact that Browne was reputed to detest science fiction. In addition to the fiction and the editorial by Fairman, it had a letter column, a profile of Wilson Tucker, a selection of science news, a guest editorial by Ken Slater, a well-known British fan, and an approving review of the TV show Tales of Tomorrow.

After Quinn dismissed Fairman and engaged Larry Shaw, the magazine improved significantly, and published several well-received stories, including James Blish's "A Case of Conscience" in the September 1953 issue, later to become the first part of Blish's Hugo Award-winning novel of the same name, about a Jesuit priest on a planet of aliens who have no religion but appear free of sin. The dominant science fiction magazines of the 1950s American market were Astounding, Galaxy, and Fantasy and Science Fiction, but If was in the next rank in terms of quality: SF historian Frank M. Robinson, for example, describes If as the "most major of the minors". Well-known writers who appeared in If in the 1950s include Harlan Ellison and Arthur C. Clarke: the original short story version of Clarke's novel The Songs of Distant Earth appeared in the June 1958 issue. Isaac Asimov's widely reprinted story "The Feeling of Power" appeared in February 1958.

	Jan	Feb	Mar	Apr	May	Jun	Jul	Aug	Sep	Oct	Nov	Dec
1962	11/6		12/1		12/2		12/3		12/4		12/5	
1963	12/6		13/1		13/2		13/3		13/4		13/5	
1964	13/6		14/1		14/2		14/3	14/4		14/5	14/6	14/7
1965	15/1	15/2	15/3	15/4	15/5	15/6	15/7	15/8	15/9	15/10	15/11	15/12
1966	16/1	16/2	16/3	16/4	16/5	16/6	16/7	16/8	16/9	16/10	16/11	16/12
1967	17/1	17/2	17/3	17/4	17/5	17/6	17/7	17/8	17/9	17/10	17/11	17/12
1968	18/1	18/2	18/3	18/4	18/5	18/6	18/7	18/8	18/9	18/10	18/11	18/12
1969	19/1	19/2	19/3	19/4	19/5		19/6		19/7	19/8	19/9	19/10
1970	20/1	20/2	20/3	20/4	20/5		20/6		20/7		20/8	
1971	20/9		20/10		20/11		20/12		21/1		21/2	
1972	21/3		21/4		21/5		21/6		21/7		21/8	
1973	21/9		21/10		21/11		21/12		22/1		22/2	
1974	22/3		22/4		22/5		22/6		22/7		22/8	
Issues of If from 1962 to 1974, showing volume/issue number. Editors were Frederik Pohl (orange), Ejler Jakobsson (pink), and James L. Baen (gray).

The period under Pohl is regarded as the magazine's heyday; the three consecutive Hugo Awards won from 1966 to 1968 broke a long period in which the award had been monopolized by Analog (the name to which Astounding changed in 1960) and Fantasy and Science Fiction. Frank Robinson commented that "Pohl was the only one who was surprised when he won three Hugos in a row for editing IF. It had been fun, and the fun had showed." Niven's "Neutron Star" appeared in October 1966, and Harlan Ellison's "I Have No Mouth and I Must Scream" appeared in March 1967; both won Hugo Awards. Pohl also managed to secure a new Skylark novel, Skylark DuQuesne, from E. E. Smith; the series had been started in the 1920s and was still popular with readers. Pohl also bought A. E. van Vogt's "The Expendables"; the story was van Vogt's first sale in 14 years and attracted long-time readers to the magazine. Another coup was the serialization of three novels by Robert A. Heinlein, including the award-winning The Moon Is a Harsh Mistress, which ran in five parts from December 1965 to April 1966.

Pohl's policy of publishing a story by a new writer in every issue led to a series called "If-firsts"; the first one, Joseph L. Green's "Once Around Arcturus", about the courtship between a man and woman of different planets, appeared in the September 1962 issue. Several of the writers featured in the If-first series, which were published from 1962 through 1965, became well-known, including Alexei Panshin; the most prominent was Larry Niven, whose first story, "The Coldest Place", appeared in December 1964. Niven later remarked that the story was immediately outdated; the plot relied on the discovery that the dark side of Mercury was the coldest place in the universe, but space probes had recently discovered that Mercury did in fact rotate asynchronously. Gardner Dozois also made his first sale to If, with "The Empty Man", about a man possessed by an alien, in the September 1966 issue, and Gene Wolfe's "Mountains Like Mice", about an abandoned group of colonists on Mars, appeared in the May 1966 issue. Technically this was not Wolfe's first sale, as he had already had "The Dead Man" published in the October 1965 issue of Sir!, but "Mountains Like Mice" had been written earlier. The Encyclopedia of Science Fiction describes the late 1960s as If's "heyday": Galaxy was considered the senior magazine for most of the fifteen years the two magazines were stablemates.

If's covers during the 1960s were typically action-oriented, showing monsters and aliens; and several of the stories Pohl published were directed at a younger audience. For example, Blish's Welcome to Mars, serialized under the title The Hour Before Earthrise in July to September 1966, was about a teenage genius whose antigravity device stranded him and his girlfriend on Mars. Ashley has suggested that If was attempting to acquire readership from the many new fans of science fiction who had been introduced to the genre through television, in particular via the popular 1960s shows Doctor Who and Star Trek. If also ran a friendly letter column, with more fan-oriented discussions than the other magazines, and between 1966 and 1968 a column by Lin Carter introduced readers to various aspects of science fiction fandom. These features are also likely to have appealed to a younger audience.

== Bibliographic details ==
Twelve issues of If, showing the major variations in cover design over the magazine's lifetime

If was a digest-sized magazine throughout its life. It began at 164 pages and with only the fifth issue, November 1952, dropped to 124 pages. The page count increased again to 134 pages with the July 1959 issue, and to 164 pages with the September 1965 issue; it stayed at this length until the September–October 1970 issue. The page count was then increased to 180 with the June 1971 issue, and reduced to 164 for the last issue, December 1974. It was priced at 35 cents to begin with, and increased to 40 cents with the March 1963 issue, to 50 cents with the December 1964 issue, to 60 cents with the August 1967 issue, and finally to 75 cents with the September–October 1970 issue. With the April 1972 issue, UPD began using card stock for the covers, rather than paper, and continued to do so until the magazine ceased publication.

If was originally subtitled Worlds of Science Fiction, but in November 1961 the cover logo was changed to Worlds of If Science Fiction. UPD formally changed the title to Worlds of If in the January/February 1972 issue and in September 1974, officially registered the title of the magazine as Worlds of If with the USPTO.

The magazine was bimonthly until the March 1954 issue, which was followed by April 1954, inaugurating a monthly period that ran until June 1955. This was followed by August 1955, resuming a bimonthly schedule that ran until July 1964, with only one irregularity, when the February 1959 issue was followed by July 1959. After July 1964, If ran a monthly schedule until April 1970, with three omissions: there were no issues dated September 1964, June 1969, or August 1969. From May–June 1970, the issues were bimonthly and bore the names of two months. This bimonthly sequence ran through the last issue at the end of 1974. The date the magazine printed on the cover reverted to a single month with the June 1971 issue, though the contents page still used two months to identify the issue. The volume numbering began with six issues to a volume: there were three errors on the magazine contents page, with volume 8 number 1 incorrectly printed as volume 7 number 6; volume 9 number 3 printed as volume 8 number 6; and volume 10 number 1 printed as volume 10 number 6. Volume 14, which began in March 1964, ran through the end of the year, with seven numbers; the remaining volumes had 12 numbers each except for volume 19 which had 10 and volume 22 which had 8.

Several British editions of If were produced. In 1953 and 1954, Strato Publications reprinted 15 issues, numbering them from 1 to 15; another 18 were reprinted between 1959 and 1962, with the issue numbers started at 1 again. Between January and November 1967 a UK edition appeared from Gold Star Publications; these were identical to the US edition dated ten months previously. Between 1972 and 1974, 15 of the UPD editions of If were imported, renumbered and repriced for UK distribution. The numbering, inexplicably, ran from 1 to 9, and then 11, 1, 13, 3, 4 and 5.

The editorial succession at If is as follows:

- Paul W. Fairman: March–September 1952
- James L. Quinn: November 1952 – August 1958. From May 1953 to March 1954, Larry T. Shaw was Associate Editor; he wrote editorials for at least three issues, beginning with September 1953, and generally did most of the editorial work.
- Damon Knight: October 1958 – February 1959
- H. L. Gold: July 1959 – November 1961
- Frederik Pohl, January 1962 – May 1969
- Ejler Jakobsson: October 1969 – January/February 1974
- Jim Baen: March/April–December 1974
- Clifford Hong: September/November 1986
- Justin T. O'Conor Sloane: February 2024 –

Eight selections of stories from If have been published. Two were edited by Quinn: The First World of If (1957) and The Second World of If (1958); four by Pohl: The Best Science Fiction from If (1964), The If Reader of Science Fiction (1966), The Second If Reader of Science Fiction (1968), and Worlds of If (1986); and two by Jakobsson, both published as by "The Editors of If": The Best from If (1973) and The Best from If Vol II (1974). In addition, two anthologies drew all their contents from If without mentioning the magazine: The 6 Fingers of Time and 5 Other Science Fiction Novelets (1965) and The Frozen Planet and Other Stories (1966). Both were edited by Samuel H. Post, who was not credited.

== Sources ==
- Ashley, Michael (1976). The History of the Science Fiction Magazine: Part 3 1946–1955. Chicago: Contemporary Books. ISBN 0-8092-7842-1.
- Ashley, Michael (1978). The History of the Science Fiction Magazine: Part 4 1956–1965. London: New English Library. ISBN 0-450-03438-0.
- Ashley, Mike (2007). Gateways to Forever: The Story of the Science-Fiction Magazines from 1970 to 1980. Liverpool: Liverpool University Press. ISBN 978-1-84631-003-4.
- Ashley, Mike (2005). Transformations: The Story of the Science Fiction Magazines from 1950 to 1970. Liverpool: Liverpool University Press. ISBN 0-85323-779-4.
- Clute, John; Nicholls, Peter (1993). The Encyclopedia of Science Fiction. New York: St. Martin's Press. ISBN 0-312-09618-6.
- Nicholls, Peter (1979). The Encyclopedia of Science Fiction. St Albans, Herts, UK: Granada Publishing. ISBN 0-586-05380-8.
- Pohl, Frederik (1979). The Way the Future Was. London: Gollancz. ISBN 0-575-02672-3.
- Robinson, Frank M. (1999). Science Fiction of the 20th Century: An Illustrated History. New York: Barnes & Noble. ISBN 0-7607-6572-3.
- Tuck, Donald H. (1982). The Encyclopedia of Science Fiction and Fantasy. Vol. 3. Chicago: Advent:Publishers. ISBN 0-911682-26-0.
