= Institute for Revenge =

- Genre: Drama; Thriller
- Written by: William Driskill
- Directed by: Ken Annakin
- Starring: Sam Groom; Lauren Hutton; George Hamilton; Leslie Nielsen; Ray Walston
- Music by: Lalo Schifrin
- Country of origin: United States
- Original language: English

Production
- Executive producers: William Driskill; Otto Salamon
- Producer: Bert Gold
- Production locations: Burbank, California; Palm Springs, California
- Cinematography: Roland 'Ozzie' Smith
- Editors: Robert M. Moss; J. Terry Williams
- Running time: 74 minutes
- Production company: Columbia Pictures Television

Original release
- Network: NBC
- Release: January 22, 1979

Institute for Revenge is a 1979 American made-for-television drama film starring Sam Groom, Lauren Hutton and George Hamilton.

== Plot summary ==
Frank Anders, an elderly retiree, is swindled by a high-powered Wall Street financier, Alan Robert (aka Alan Roberto). After exhausting all legal avenues to find justice and recover his lost savings, Anders is approached by a stranger with a mysterious business card. It is from a private agency known as the I.F.R. Upon contacting the firm, he learns the initials stand for "Institute for Revenge." Anders discusses his case against Roberto with the agency's head, Wellington, who, like Anders, is also elderly. However, the agency's resourceful personnel are young and energetic. And they are dedicated to their mission—to attain justice for those who, like Anders, are unable to.

After agreeing to take Anders' case, Wellington assembles a squad of "avengers," led by handsome, well-dressed John Schroeder, who will pose as a corporate raider, out to secure majority ownership of one of Mr. Roberto's lucrative business ventures. Schroeder is accompanied by Lilla Simms, role-playing the part of his beautiful live-in partner. To round out the team, there is T. J. Bradley, a young wizard aircraft mechanic, who is accompanied by a personable, versatile actress named Joanne Newcomb. Their job is to use their various talents to achieve two specific goals—to see to it that millionaire scam-artist Roberto loses his broker's license permanently and that Anders collect the money that Roberto stole from him.

== Cast ==
- Sam Groom as John Schroeder
- Lauren Hutton as Lilla Simms
- George Hamilton as Alan Roberto
- Leslie Nielsen as Hollis Barnes
- Ray Walston as Frank Anders
- Robert Coote as Wellington
- Lane Binkley as Joanne Newcomb
- T.J. McCavitt as T.J. Bradley
- Murray Salem as Sam
- Robert Emhardt as Senator
