= Sam Groom =

American actor (born 1938)

Sam Groom (born 1938) is an American film and television actor.

== Life and career ==
Groom, born in 1938, portrayed Tom Eldridge in the CBS drama Our Private World (1965). Following the cancellation of that prime-time serial, he took the role of Lee Pollock on The Edge of Night before appearing as Dr. Russ Matthews on Another World. He played the title role in the syndicated television series Dr. Simon Locke (1971), and its spinoff, Police Surgeon. Groom appeared on Gunsmoke in 1972 and 1973 (episodes "No Tomorrow" and "The Child Between" respectively). He also played Hal Sterling, the father of a castaway family, on the 1980s science fiction television series Otherworld. He later played Joseph Orsini in All My Children in 1993. During the 1980s, he was a spokesperson for American Motors, appearing in many commercials for the popular American Motors' Concord and American Motors' Eagle model lineups.

Groom made guest appearances in Law & Order; Murder, She Wrote; The Love Boat; Hill Street Blues; Quincy, M.E.; Gunsmoke; The Feather and Father Gang; The Bionic Woman; and The Time Tunnel as a young scientist named Jerry. In 1976, he appeared both in an episode of Sara and in Territorial Men, a television movie version of the series. His film career included roles in Act One (1963); The Baby Maker (1970); Time Travelers (1976); Run for the Roses (1977); Institute for Revenge (1979); Hanging by a Thread (1979); The Day the Loving Stopped (1981); Deadly Eyes (1982); and as John F. Kennedy in the television miniseries Blood Feud (1983).

Groom is currently a part of the faculty at HB Studio in New York City.

== See also ==
- List of people with surname Groom
