= Ed Valigursky =

Edward Ignatius Valigursky (October 16, 1926 in Arnold, Pennsylvania – September 7, 2009 in Cape Coral, Florida) was an American illustrator known for his portrayals of technology, and for his work in science fiction.

== Biography ==
Valigursky joined the United States Navy in 1943 or 1945, where he remained until 1946 or 1948. After he left the service, he used his GI Bill benefits to attend the Art Institute of Chicago, and then transferred to the Art Institute of Pittsburgh.

In 1952, he moved to New York City, where he worked for Ziff Davis as an art director. There, he began illustrating that company's pulp magazines, including Amazing Stories and Fantastic Adventures. In 1953, he began working for James L. Quinn's Quinn Publications, where he provided illustrations for If. He also provided over 100 cover images for Ace Books; however, this number is uncertain, because he did not always sign his work, and because in that era, Ace did not credit its cover artists.

Subsequently, he left science fiction for general fiction and non-fiction magazines; The Encyclopedia of Science Fiction notes that this was because those publications paid more.

== Recognition ==
Valigursky was a nominee for the 1956 Hugo Award for Best Professional Artist.

The Encyclopedia of Science Fiction found Valigursky's work to be "perfectly suited for the space operas and futuristic melodramas [of Ace Books]" and praised his depictions of robots and "his characteristic needle-nosed spaceships", but faulted those of his images that "focus on human figures" as "less interesting", concluding that although "Valigursky cannot be regarded as a great sf artist, (...) his distinctive style will always be fondly associated with the simple pleasure of reading unambitious, unpretentious space adventures."

In 1989, Popular Mechanics stated that he was "one of [America's] best-known illustrators of aircraft, ships, spacecraft, and other machines", and that his works were "on permanent display [at] the Pentagon [and] numerous naval and air force installations."
