= Booth Colman =

American actor (1923–2014)

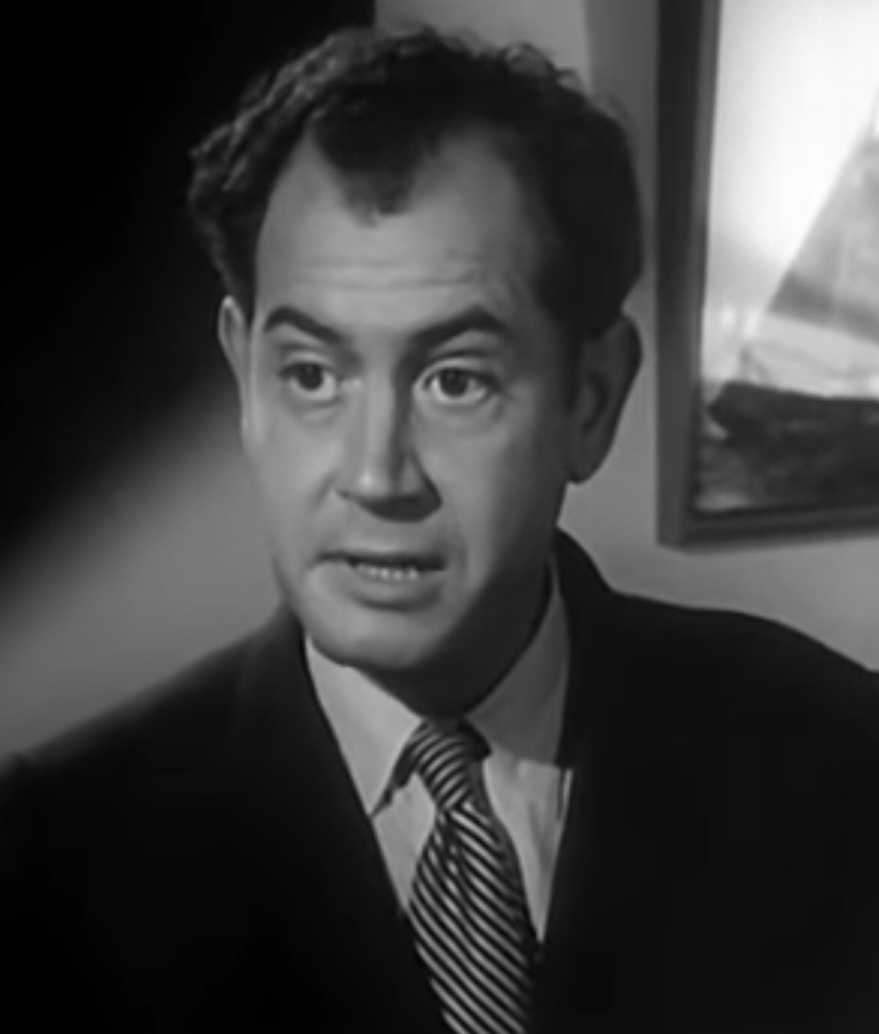
- Colman in Man with a Camera (1959)
- Born: March 8, 1923; Portland, Oregon, U.S.
- Died: December 15, 2014 (aged 91); Los Angeles, California, U.S.
- Education: University of Washington; University of Michigan
- Occupation: Actor
- Years active: 1952–2008
- Website: boothcolman.com

Booth Colman (March 8, 1923 – December 15, 2014) was an American film, television and stage actor. In his later years he played older authority figures, such as doctors and lawyers. Colman appeared in films since 1952, when he debuted (uncredited) in The Big Sky directed by Howard Hawks.

== Life and career ==
Colman was born to a Jewish parents Sol and Sona Cohn in Portland, Oregon. As a child actor in local productions, he became active in local radio. He studied Oriental language at the University of Washington and University of Michigan. During World War II, he enlisted in the United States Army on May 12, 1943, and attended language training at the University of Michigan from 1943 to 1944. After language training, he worked in New York City and was discharged from the army in 1944 at Fort Dix, New Jersey. While in New York, he began a long career in Broadway theater, first appearing in a production of Irwin Shaw's war drama The Assassin. He was soon invited to join Maurice Evans' acting company, where he continued to act on stage, and later in films. His other Broadway credits include Now I Lay Me Down to Sleep (1950), Tonight at 8:30 (1948), and Hamlet (1945).

He appeared dozens of times on prime-time television dramas and comedies. In 1964, he appeared in two full episodes of Perry Mason, one as a doctor in police investigations and the other as a prosecuting attorney. Other televisions appearances include My Three Sons (1962), Frasier, Gilligan's Island, McCloud and The Monkees. Films include Them! (1954), The Silver Chalice (1954), Moonfleet (1955), My Gun Is Quick (1957), Wild on the Beach (1965), Maryjane (1968), The Lawyer (1970), Scandalous John (1971), Time Travelers (1976), Norma Rae (1979) and Intolerable Cruelty (2003). In 1983, he portrayed the kindly scientist, Professor Hector Jerrold, in the ABC daytime melodrama General Hospital.

In 1974, Colman played the role of Dr. Zaius in the popular short-lived TV series, Planet of the Apes; the role made famous on the big screen by his former teacher, Maurice Evans. In the six episodes in which he appeared, he wore the original costume Evans used in Planet of the Apes and Beneath the Planet of the Apes.

Colman played Scrooge over 600 times on stage in A Christmas Carol at the Meadow Brook Theatre in the Detroit area.

== Death ==
He died in his sleep in Los Angeles at the age of 91 on December 15, 2014.

== Filmography ==
=== Film ===
| Year | Title | Role | Notes |
|---|---|---|---|
| 1952 | The Big Sky | Pascal | Uncredited |
| 1953 | Julius Caesar | Citizen of Rome | Uncredited |
| 1953 | Flight Nurse | Australian | Uncredited |
| 1954 | Secret of the Incas | Juan Fernandez | Uncredited |
| 1954 | Them! | Reporter | Uncredited |
| 1954 | Ring of Fear | Psychiatrist | Uncredited |
| 1954 | Living It Up | Fernandez | Uncredited |
| 1954 | The Adventures of Hajji Baba | Akim | Uncredited |
| 1954 | The Human Jungle | Wallace | |
| 1954 | The Silver Chalice | Hiram | |
| 1955 | Prince of Players | Ghost of Buckingham Palace | Uncredited |
| 1955 | The Prodigal | Barber | Uncredited |
| 1955 | Jump into Hell | Legionnaire | Uncredited |
| 1955 | Moonfleet | Capt. Stanhope | |
| 1956 | World Without End | Mories | |
| 1956 | Flight to Hong Kong | Maxler | |
| 1957 | My Gun Is Quick | Det. Pat Chambers | |
| 1958 | The Beast of Budapest | Lt. Stefko | |
| 1958 | The Case Against Brooklyn | George - TV Interviewer | Uncredited |
| 1958 | Tarawa Beachhead | Sam Pelligram | Uncredited |
| 1958 | Auntie Mame | Alan - Party Guest | Uncredited |
| 1958 | The Power of the Resurrection | James | |
| 1959 | The Man Who Understood Women | Max | Uncredited |
| 1960 | The Bramble Bush | Dr. Peterford | Uncredited |
| 1960 | Under Ten Flags | | |
| 1961 | Romanoff and Juliet | Customs Officer | |
| 1961 | The Comancheros | Hotel Clerk | Uncredited |
| 1964 | A Global Affair | United Nations Delegate | Uncredited |
| 1964 | Kisses for My President | TV Producer | Uncredited |
| 1964 | Fate Is the Hunter | Technician with Seagull feather | Uncredited |
| 1964 | Youngblood Hawke | TV Interviewer | Uncredited |
| 1964 | Raiders from Beneath the Sea | Purdy | |
| 1965 | Runaway Girl | Angelo Guglietta | |
| 1965 | Harlow | Minister | Uncredited |
| 1965 | Arizona Raiders | Ohio Gazette Editor | Uncredited |
| 1965 | Wild on the Beach | Dean Parker | |
| 1968 | Maryjane | Maynard Parlow | |
| 1970 | The Lawyer | Judge Crawford | |
| 1970 | The Great White Hope | Citizens Committee Man | Uncredited |
| 1971 | Scandalous John | Governor Murray | |
| 1973 | Time to Run | Officer Harvey | |
| 1974 | I Love You... Good-bye | Professor Halton | |
| 1979 | Norma Rae | Dr. Watson | |
| 2000 | Return to the Secret Garden | Old Man | |
| 2001 | The Man Who Wasn't There | Judge #2 | |
| 2003 | Intolerable Cruelty | Gutman Trial Judge | |

=== Television ===
| Year | Title | Role | Notes |
|---|---|---|---|
| 1950 | Somerset Maugham TV Theatre | | Episode: "The String of Beads" |
| 1952–1954 | Schlitz Playhouse of Stars | Napoleon | 2 episodes |
| 1953 | Mr. and Mrs. North | Reese | Episode: "Seven Sacred Rubies" |
| 1953 | Ford Television Theatre | | Episode: "The Doctor's Downfall" |
| 1953 | The Revlon Mirror Theater | | Episode: "Equal Justice" |
| 1953–1955 | Cavalcade of America | | 4 episodes |
| 1955 | Lux Video Theatre | Anatol France | Episode: "The Life of Emile Zola" |
| 1955 | Climax! | | Episode: "Flight 951" |
| 1955 | Science Fiction Theatre | Dr. McLeod | Episode: "Dead Storage" |
| 1956 | Passport to Danger | | Episode: "Marseilles" |
| 1956 | The Adventures of Jim Bowie | Jacques / Brissac / Lantanac | 3 episodes |
| 1956 | Matinee Theatre | | Episode: "Savrola" |
| 1956 | Telephone Time | | Episode: "Fortunatus" |
| 1956–1958 | Broken Arrow | Arthur Spruance / Wilkins | 2 episodes |
| 1957 | The George Burns and Gracie Allen Show | Art Roberts | Episode: "The Texan Italian" |
| 1957 | The Gray Ghost | Grady | Episode: "The Missing Colonel" |
| 1958 | Dragnet | | Episode: "The Big Grifter" |
| 1958 | How to Marry a Millionaire | Tompkins / Charlie | 2 episodes |
| 1958 | The Silent Service | Chief Torpedoman Swerdling | Episode: "The Silversides Story" |
| 1958 | Rescue 8 | Will Dorset / Dorton - Director | Episode: "Calamity Coach" |
| 1958 | The Veil | Edmond Valier | Episode: "The Crystal Ball" |
| 1958–1962 | Death Valley Days | Dr. Frank Shelton / Defense Attorney / Bob Stevenson | 3 episodes |
| 1959 | Man with a Camera | Idrees Lateef | Episode: "The Last Portrait" |
| 1959 | Yancy Derringer | Henry Duval | Episode: "The Louisiana Dude" |
| 1959 | Behind Closed Doors | Branko | Episode: "The Meeting" |
| 1959 | The Californians | Ralph Keel | Episode: "The Fugitive" |
| 1959 | Zorro | Pineda | Episode: "An Affair of Honor" |
| 1961 | Cain's Hundred | Doctor | Episode: "Degrees of Guilt" |
| 1961 | The Rifleman | Jeremiah | Episode: "The High Country" |
| 1961–1962 | Thriller | Lieutenant Bailey / Hotel Desk Clerk | 2 episodes |
| 1962 | Adventures in Paradise | Dr. Finney / Chitral | 2 episodes |
| 1962 | Route 66 | Dr. Snyder | Episode: "Even Stones Have Eyes" |
| 1962 | King of Diamonds | Robbins | Episode: "Carla" |
| 1962 | I'm Dickens, He's Fenster | | Episode: "Nurse Dickens" |
| 1962 | Have Gun – Will Travel | Mort Tyler | Episode: "Marshal of Sweetwater" |
| 1962 | Cheyenne | Colonel Travers | Episode: "Johnny Brassbuttons" |
| 1962–1963 | The Untouchables | Nicholas Continue / Mike Pavanos / Victor Bartok | 3 episodes |
| 1962–1966 | Bonanza | Parson Parley / Flint Durfee / Henry P. Quince | 4 episodes |
| 1962–1972 | My Three Sons | Dr. Fredericks / Mr. Kranzman / Kramer / Dr. Zoltan / Enoch Lieb | 5 episodes |
| 1963 | The Dick Powell Theatre | Warden | Episode: "Tissue of Hate" |
| 1963 | The Gallant Men | German Captain | Episode: "Ol' Buddy" |
| 1963 | GE True | Funeral Director | Episode: "The Black-Robed Ghost" |
| 1963 | 77 Sunset Strip | Walter Dorn / Judge Taylor | 2 episodes |
| 1963 | Temple Houston | | Episode: "The Twisted Rope" |
| 1963 | The Greatest Show on Earth | Boykin | Episode: "Garve" |
| 1963–1972 | Gunsmoke | Rand / Gant | 2 episodes |
| 1964 | The Outer Limits | Doctor Howard Warren | Episode: "ZZZZZ" |
| 1964 | Perry Mason | Prosecutor / Doctor Younger | 2 episodes |
| 1964 | Voyage to the Bottom of the Sea | Chairman | 2 episodes |
| 1964 | The Rogues | Hoagland | Episode: "The Day They Gave Diamonds Away" |
| 1964 | Ben Casey | Dr. Norman Dryfus | Episode: "Courage at 3:00 A.M." |
| 1965 | Profiles in Courage | Aaron Burr / Emerson | 2 episodes |
| 1965 | Slattery's People | Judge | Episode: "Question: Did He Who Made the Lamb Make Thee?" |
| 1965 | The Fugitive | Les Donaldson | Episode: "Trial by Fire" |
| 1965 | Gilligan's Island | Professor John Corwell | Episode: "Smile, You're on Mars Camera" |
| 1965 | The Wild Wild West | Ambassador Xavier Perkins | Episode: "The Night of the Dancing Death" |
| 1965–1968 | Run for Your Life | Doc / Prosecutor Colman | 2 episodes |
| 1965–1969 | Daniel Boone | Gov. Patrick Henry / Whitmore / High Pvt. A. Slimpsey | 4 episodes |
| 1965–1966 | The Farmer's Daughter | Judge / MacDougall | 2 episodes |
| 1966 | Hogan's Heroes | Captain Guenther | Episode: "The Safecracker Suite" |
| 1966 | The Monkees | The Chief | Episode: "The Spy Who Came in from the Cool" |
| 1966–1967 | I Dream of Jeannie | General Pichegru / Dean Geller | 2 episodes |
| 1966–1967 | The F.B.I. | Albert Vogel / Lane Morris / Martin Davis | 3 episodes |
| 1967 | Iron Horse | Man #3 | Episode: "The Golden Web" |
| 1967 | The Second Hundred Years | Barrows | Episode: "Little Lady X" |
| 1967 | Garrison's Gorillas | Ernst Gerloch | Episode: "Banker's Hours" |
| 1967 | Judd, for the Defense | Judge | Episode: "Death from a Flower Girl" |
| 1967–1970 | Mission: Impossible | Stravos / Dr. Huss | 2 episodes |
| 1967–1971 | Mannix | Leo Kolligian / Max Bonnett | 3 episodes |
| 1968 | The Invaders | Coroner Braemer | Episode: "The Possessed" |
| 1968 | Tarzan | Commissioner Lacing | Episode: "Rendezvous for Revenge" |
| 1968 | The Outsider | Benjamin Seaton | Episode: "What Flowers Daisies Are" |
| 1968–1969 | The Name of the Game | Volmer / Dr. Whitman | 2 episodes |
| 1968–1970 | The Flying Nun | Priest / Bishop Parnell | 2 episodes |
| 1969 | Marcus Welby, M.D. | Mr. Huntsman | Episode: "The Foal" |
| 1969 | Adam-12 | Judge Robert Ricks | Episode: "Log 123: Courtroom" |
| 1970 | Medical Center | Dr. Walter Persky | Episode: "The Deceived" |
| 1970 | The Virginian | Mr. Compton / Jeff Turner | 2 episodes |
| 1970 | Family Affair | Mr. Finletter | Episode: "The Inheritance" |
| 1970 | The Mod Squad | Dr. Grant Ames | Episode: "Who Are the Keepers, Who Are the Inmates?" |
| 1970 | Dan August | Dr. Germain | Episode: "The Color of Fury" |
| 1971 | Arnie | Minister | Episode: "Stand Up for Julius" |
| 1971 | Alias Smith and Jones | Telegraph Operator / Carlton | 2 episodes |
| 1971 | Gideon | Hezekiah | Television film |
| 1971 | The D.A. | Dr. Parkins | Episode: "The People vs. Drake" |
| 1971–1972 | The Smith Family | Ex Con | 2 episodes |
| 1971–1977 | McCloud | Coroner / Hines | 3 episodes |
| 1972 | Adventures of Nick Carter | Parsons | Television film |
| 1972 | Cannon | Dante Linquist | Episode: "That Was No Lady" |
| 1972–1976 | The Streets of San Francisco | Ira Foster / Jensen, Records Clerk | 2 episodes |
| 1973 | Barnaby Jones | Victor Sterne | Episode: "The Murdering Class" |
| 1973 | Kung Fu | Sentinel | Episode: "The Squawman" |
| 1973 | Love Story | Lewin | Episode: "When the Girls Came Out to Play" |
| 1974 | A Tree Grows in Brooklyn | Doctor | Television film |
| 1974 | Fools, Females and Fun | Wally | Television film |
| 1974 | Planet of the Apes | Zaius | 6 episodes |
| 1974 | Apple's Way | Mayor | Episode: "The Outsider" |
| 1974–1976 | Police Story | Pearl / Pathologist / Medical Examiner | 3 episodes |
| 1975 | Lincoln | Senator Samuel C. Pomeroy | Episode: "Sad Figure, Laughing" |
| 1975 | Lucas Tanner | Jerry Trevin | Episode: "A Touch of Bribery" |
| 1975 | Returning Home | Vern Miller | Television film |
| 1975 | The Blue Knight | Coroner | Episode: "Two to Make Deadly" |
| 1975 | Barbary Coast | Dr. Mattwick | Episode: "The Day Cable Was Hanged" |
| 1975–1976 | Switch | Phil Hardice / Seegar | 2 episodes |
| 1976 | Harry O | Sturgis | Episode: "Mister Five and Dime" |
| 1976 | Time Travelers | Dr. Amos Cummings | Television film |
| 1976 | City of Angels | | Episode: "The Bloodshot Eye" |
| 1976 | The Return of the World's Greatest Detective | Psychiatrist | Television film |
| 1976 | Francis Gary Powers: The True Story of the U-2 Spy Incident | | Television film |
| 1976 | Holmes & Yoyo | Mr. Austin | Episode: "The Thornhill Affair" |
| 1977 | Yesterday's Child | Doctor | Television film |
| 1977 | Baa Baa Black Sheep | Col. Richardson | Episode: "The Last Mission Over Sengai" |
| 1977 | Delvecchio | Judge Schnider | 2 episodes |
| 1977 | In the Glitter Palace | Kubishan | Television film |
| 1977 | Gibbsville | Mr. Cameron | Episode: "All I've Tried to Be" |
| 1977–1979 | Quincy, M.E. | Mr. Fenton / Dr. Edwards | 2 episodes |
| 1977–1981 | Lou Grant | Dr. Prentiss / Mr. McClintock / Judge / Mr. Curtis | 4 episodes |
| 1978 | Police Woman | Mr. Klemin | Episode: "The Young and the Fair" |
| 1978 | Project U.F.O. | Arthur Hammond | Episode: "Sighting 4019: The Believe It or Not Incident" |
| 1979 | The White Shadow | Pawn Brooker | Episode: "Wanna Bet?" |
| 1979 | The Waltons | Dr. Caldwell | Episode: "The Parting" |
| 1979 | How the West Was Won | Kingsley | Episode: "Hillary" |
| 1979 | The Best Place to Be | | Television film |
| 1979 | The Misadventures of Sheriff Lobo | The Professor | Episode: "The Day That Shark Ate Lobo" |
| 1979 | Marciano | Dr. Stevens | Television film |
| 1980 | Galactica 1980 | Rogers | Episode: "Space Croppers" |
| 1986 | The Young and the Restless | Dr. Felix Burke | 5 episodes |
| 1987 | Destination America | | Television film |
| 1988 | Shootdown | Bernard | Television film |
| 1991–1992 | Civil Wars | Judge Herbert Hoffer | 3 episodes |
| 1995 | Chicago Hope | Father Fatima | Episode: "Rise from the Dead" |
| 1997 | Star Trek: Voyager | Penno | Episode: "Nemesis" |
| 1999 | Air America | Nicolai Vyshenko | Episode: "American Gulag" |
| 2003 | Frasier | Mr. Slobodkin | Episode: "Daphne Does Dinner" |
| 2005 | Jake in Progress | The Ice Cream Man | Episode: "Desperate Houseguy" |
| 2006 | My Name Is Earl | Scientist | Episode: "Monkeys in Space" |
| 2008 | The Suite Life of Zack & Cody | Scooter | Episode: "Foiled Again" |
