= Salvage 1 =

American science fiction television series

- Genre: Science fiction
- Created by: Mike Lloyd Ross
- Starring: Andy Griffith; Joel Higgins; Trish Stewart; Richard Jaeckel; Jacqueline Scott; J. Jay Saunders; Heather McAdam
- Theme music composer: Walter Scharf
- Composers: Jack Hayes; Ken Harrison
- Country of origin: United States
- Original language: English
- No. of seasons: 2
- No. of episodes: 20 (4 unaired)

Production
- Executive producers: Harve Bennett; Harris Katleman
- Producers: Mike Lloyd Ross; Ralph Sariego; Craig Schiller
- Camera setup: Single-camera
- Running time: 60 minutes
- Production companies: Bennett/Katleman Productions; Columbia Pictures Television

Original release
- Network: ABC
- Release: January 20 – December 9, 1979

Related
- Salvage

Salvage 1 is an American science fiction series that was broadcast for 16 episodes (of the 20 produced) on ABC during 1979. The series was based on the pilot film, Salvage, broadcast in early 1979.

== Premise ==
Salvage operator Harry Broderick buys and sells scrap as well as electronics, aircraft and other equipment. Harry constantly has grandiose schemes to make money, sometimes not completely honestly. In the pilot, his dream is to recover equipment left on the Moon during Apollo Program missions for he believes the salvage value will make it a worthwhile venture. In the show's opening title narration, Harry states:

"I wanna build a spaceship, go to the Moon, salvage all the junk that's up there, bring it back, sell it."

He recruits former astronaut Skip Carmichael, who had departed from NASA because his revolutionary but unorthodox space flight theory was considered too risky. Skip leads Harry to Mel Slozar, a genius fuel and explosives expert who had been working as a pyrotechnics expert in the motion picture industry. Mel has formulated an extremely powerful but dangerous monopropellant, monohydrazine, that would enable not only single-stage-to-orbit but single-stage-to-the-Moon and back. FBI agent Jack Klinger is sent to investigate Mel's purchase of large amounts of explosive chemicals. They build a space vehicle named the Vulture and Skip and Mel voyage to the Moon, salvage the equipment and return.

The remainder of the series has the group embarking on various moneymaking ventures that Harry conceives, few of which involve the Vulture despite its prominence in the opening titles.

=== The Vulture ===
Harry built a spaceship dubbed the Vulture, made from reclaimed salvage and former NASA parts. A cement mixer, a gasoline tanker trailer, and several surplus rocket engines (bought at auction when the space program was in a slump) became the homemade spaceship. After the pilot, the Vulture was rarely used. One of its engines was destroyed in the second-season premiere and it was never used again in subsequent episodes.

== Cast ==
- Andy Griffith as Harry Broderick, owner of Jettison Scrap and Salvage Co.
- Joel Higgins as Addison "Skip" Carmichael, former NASA astronaut.
- Trish Stewart as Melanie "Mel" Slozar, who worked with Skip at NASA.
- J. Jay Saunders as Mack, a former engineer at NASA and Harry's technical assistant at Jettison.
- Richard Jaeckel as FBI agent Jack Klinger (first season only).
- Heather McAdam as Michelle Ryan, an orphan that Mel befriends and wants to adopt (second season only).

Jacqueline Scott played Lorene, the office manager at Jettison (who was also Harry's ex-wife) in the pilot, but the character was eliminated in the series.

== Episodes ==
=== Season 1 (1979) ===
No. overall	No. in season	Title	Directed by	Written by	Original release date
1	1	"Salvage"	Lee Philips	Mike Lloyd Ross	January 20, 1979
2	2	"Salvage"	Lee Philips	Mike Lloyd Ross	January 20, 1979
Harry puts together a ragtag team to realize his dream of going to the Moon and salvaging abandoned NASA equipment there.
3	3	"Dark Island"	Gene Nelson	Ruel Fischmann	January 29, 1979
Harry and his crew, who want to obtain dwarf spider monkeys for the San Diego Zoo, end up stranded on a remote island where they discover a giant ape.
4	4	"Shangri-la Lil"	Ron Satlof	Judy Burns	February 5, 1979
During a search for a B-25 bomber to salvage Harry finds a Japanese soldier who is unaware World War II has ended.
5	5	"Shelter Five"	Jim Benson	S : Geoffrey Fischer; T : Gerald K. Siegel	February 12, 1979
Harry buys a decommissioned military fallout shelter. An earthquake ruptures a water tank in the shelter, threatening to drown the young daughter of the facility's commanding officer.
6	6	"The Haunting of Manderly Mansion"	Ray Austin	Mike Robe	February 26, 1979
Harry buys a supposedly haunted house to salvage, but the ghost turns out to be an alien stranded on Earth.
7	7	"The Bugatti Treasure"	Edward M. Abroms	S : Mike Lloyd Ross; T : Richard Chapman & Ruel Fischmann	March 5, 1979
A 16th century map is found inside of a 1934 Bugatti coupe that Harry bought. Will the map lead to Cortez's treasure?
8	8	"The Golden Orbit: Part 1"	Ron Satlof	Robert Swanson	March 12, 1979
Harry wants to salvage a gold-plated satellite, while Skip is onboard a NASA spacecraft with a liquid nitrogen leak.
9	9	"The Golden Orbit: Part 2"	Ron Satlof	Robert Swanson	March 19, 1979
Harry needs to rescue Skip and the others on the damaged spacecraft, but Jack Klinger impounds Salvage 1.
10	10	"Operation Breakout"	Gerald Finnerman	Gerald K. Siegel	April 2, 1979
An African dictator kidnaps Jack Klinger and demands a U.S. missile, but the U.S. government will not respond to the demand. Harry and his crew work to rescue Klinger.
11	11	"Mermadon"	Ron Satlof	Mike Lloyd Ross	April 16, 1979
Harry befriends a runaway robot programmed to kill anyone believed to be a threat.
12	12	"Up, Up and Away"	Les Green	Robert Swanson	May 14, 1979
Harry survives a plane crash in a remote area, then faces outlaws determined to steal the counterfeit money in the plane.
13	13	"Energy Solution"	Ron Satlof	Richard Chapman & Ruel Fischmann	May 21, 1979
Melanie's plan to create crude oil causes an underground fire.
14	14	"Confederate Gold"	Ray Austin	T : Jack Turley; S/T : Robert Swanson	May 28, 1979
Harry and his crew search for Confederate gold, but are captured by local townspeople.

The first season ranked 48th out of 114 shows that season with an average 17.7/26 rating/share.

=== Season 2 (1979) ===
No. overall	No. in season	Title	Directed by	Written by	Original release date
15	1	"Hard Water: Part 1"	Les Green	Mike Lloyd Ross	November 4, 1979
Harry proposes to tow an iceberg to a drought-stricken island off southern California, but a rival salvage company steals their idea.
16	2	"Hard Water: Part 2"	Les Green	Mike Lloyd Ross	November 11, 1979
Harry's rival bungles the transport of the iceberg so it threatens San Francisco. Harry tries to tow the iceberg to safety before the Navy has to destroy it.
17	3	"Round Up"	Ron Satlof	S : Walter Bloch; T : Jeri Taylor	unaired
Harry and his crew try to save wild horses the government plans to slaughter.
18	4	"Harry's Doll"	Edward M. Abroms	Richard Pierce & Ruel Fischmann	unaired
Harry buys a racehorse that shows little promise of winning races.
19	5	"Dry Spell"	Ray Austin	Jeri Taylor	unaired
Harry visits his aunt's small town, which has had no rain in years.
20	6	"Diamond Volcano"	Dana Elcar	Geoffrey Fischer	unaired
Harry offers his crew a Hawaiian vacation, but Skip and Melanie discover he wants to mine for diamonds inside a dormant volcano.

Six episodes of the second season were produced before ABC cancelled the series. Only the two-part season opener was broadcast. The last four episodes were shown in 1990 on Nostalgia Television, and overseas in the UK in some ITV regions in 1981.

== Production ==
Science fiction author Isaac Asimov was the show's scientific adviser. (Note: Appeared only in closing credits of some Salvage 1 episodes after the pilot. Asimov also states in his autobiography, I, Asimov, that he served as an advisor for a few Salvage 1 episodes)

== Merchandise ==
Estes Rockets made a prototype of a model rocket version of the Vulture. It was never brought to market.
