= The Time Tunnel =

American sci-fi television series (1966–1967)

- Created by: Irwin Allen
- Starring: James Darren; Robert Colbert; Whit Bissell; John Zaremba; Lee Meriwether; Sam Groom; Wesley Lau
- Country of origin: United States
- No. of episodes: 30

Production
- Running time: approx. 50 minutes
- Production companies: Irwin Allen Productions; Kent Productions Inc. 20th Century-Fox Television

Original release
- Network: ABC
- Release: September 9, 1966 – April 7, 1967

The Time Tunnel is an American science-fiction television series written around a theme of time travel adventure; it starred James Darren and Robert Colbert. The show was creator-producer Irwin Allen's third science-fiction television series and was released by 20th Century Fox Television and broadcast on ABC. The show ran for one season of 30 episodes from September 9, 1966 to April 7, 1967. A new pilot was produced in 2002, but failed to proceed to a series.

== Premise ==
Project Tic-Toc is a top-secret U.S. government effort to build an experimental time machine, known as "The Time Tunnel" due to its appearance as an elliptical passageway. The base for Project Tic-Toc is a huge, hidden underground facility in Arizona, 800 floors deep and employing more than 12,000 specialized personnel in each of three complexes. The directors of the project are Dr. Douglas Phillips (Colbert), Dr. Anthony Newman (Darren), and Lt. General Heywood Kirk (Whit Bissell). The specialists assisting them are Dr. Raymond Swain (John Zaremba), a foremost expert in electronics, and Dr. Ann MacGregor (Lee Meriwether), an electrobiologist supervising the unit that determines how much force and heat a time traveler is able to withstand. The series is set in 1968, two years into the future from the actual broadcast season, 1966–1967.

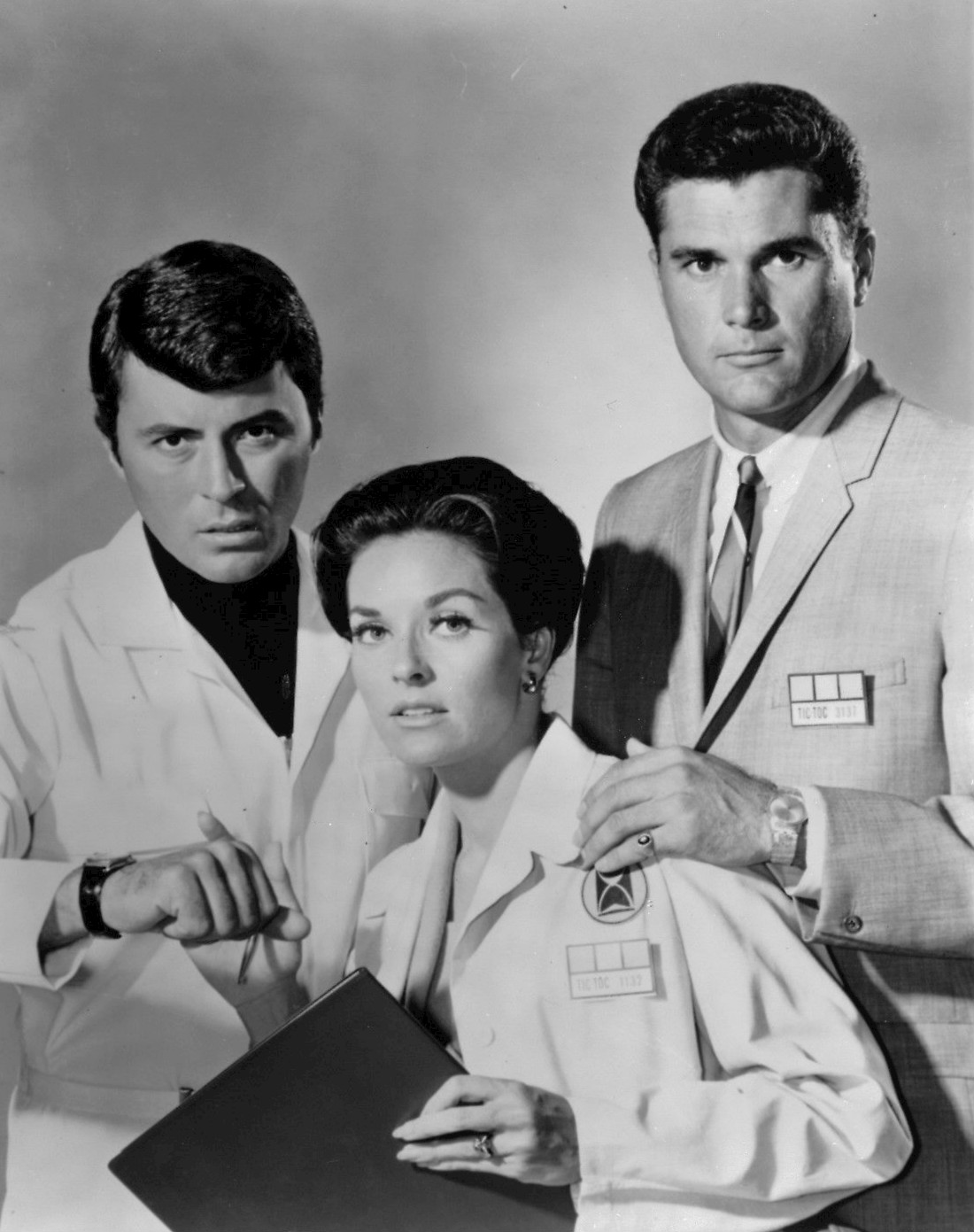
Doctors Newman (James Darren), MacGregor (Lee Meriwether), and Phillips (Robert Colbert), 1966

Project Tic-Toc is in its 10th year when United States Senator Leroy Clark (Gary Merrill) comes to investigate to determine whether the project, which has cost $7.5 billion (equivalent to $74 billion in 2025), is worth continuing. Senator Clark feels the project is a waste of government funds. When speaking to Phillips, Kirk, and Newman in front of the Time Tunnel, he delivers an ultimatum – either they send someone into time and return him during the course of his visit or their funding will cease. Tony volunteers for this endeavor, but he is turned down by project director Doug Phillips. Defying this decision, Tony sends himself into time. Doug follows shortly after to rescue him, but they both continue to be lost in time. Senator Clark returns to Washington with the promise that funding will not be cut off to the project, leaving General Kirk in charge.

The stage is set for the progress of the series as Tony and Doug are now "switched" from one period in history to another, allowing episodes to be set in the past and future. Episodes two through 23 begin with the following narration (voiced by Dick Tufeld):

Two American scientists are lost in the swirling maze of past and future ages, during the first experiments on America's greatest and most secret project, the Time Tunnel. Tony Newman and Doug Phillips now tumble helplessly toward a new fantastic adventure, somewhere along the infinite corridors of time.

Tony and Doug become participants in past events such as the sinking of the Titanic, the attack on Pearl Harbor, the eruption of Krakatoa, Custer's Last Stand, and the Battle of the Alamo, among others. General Kirk, Ray, and Ann in the control room are able to locate them in time and space, observe them, occasionally communicate with them through voice contact, and send help. The series was abruptly cancelled in the summer of 1967 by ABC, before they were able to film the episode in which Tony and Doug are safely returned to the Time Tunnel complex. Tony's personal biography is referred to in some episodes. In the first episodes, he tells the visiting Senator that he was born in 1938, which means that he was 30 years old at the time of the project. However, in the third episode, it is stated clearly that he was seven years old when the Japanese attack on Pearl Harbor took place, which means he was born in 1934. This contradiction is never explained throughout the series.

== Possibility of time travel ==
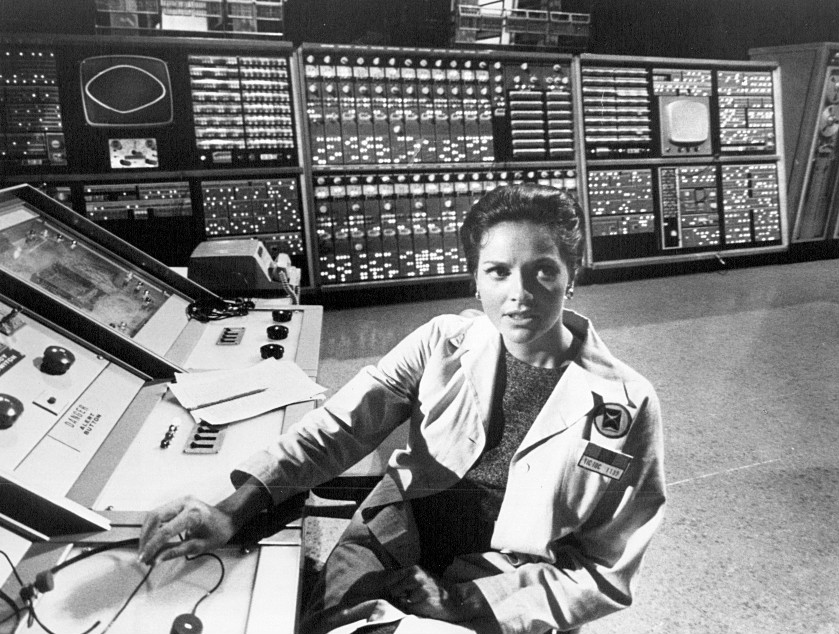
Lee Meriwether as Dr. Ann MacGregor

According to the plot, time travel is facilitated by time being portrayed as a static continuum, accessible at any point through the Time Tunnel as a corridor spanning its infinite reaches. When Senator Clark sees an image of the Titanic on the image screen in the course of episode one, he is told by Dr. Swain that he is seeing "the living past", and Althea Hall is told by Tony Newman that the past and the future are the same. The Time Tunnel is also a portal connecting the Time Tunnel "complex" with the same time periods in which Doug and Tony are located. Other people can also be relocated by the Time Tunnel from their time to another time as Machiavelli is switched from his own time to the time of the Gettysburg campaign of 1863. Bringing people (other than Tony and Doug) to the present happens often in the series, but the only occasion in which Tony and Doug return to their own time occurs in "Merlin the Magician", when the great wizard uses magic to bring them home in suspended animation so he can instruct them to perform a mission for him.

In the course of the series, Doug, Tony, and the Time Tunnel personnel discover that events of the past can be altered to some extent by the intrusion of the time travelers, and in a few cases, their historical research allows for it. Episode 26 ("Attack of the Barbarians") explores the scenario of one of the time travelers falling in love with someone from the past: Tony and the Princess Serit, daughter of Kublai Khan. Marco Polo tells Doug, "Can they not touch each other?" History itself hints at the possibility of Serit marrying Tony as Ann informs General Kirk. The historical information on Billy the Kid's victims alarms Ann, Ray, and the General, as it records that he killed two strangers near Lincoln, New Mexico, in April 1881—just when Tony, Doug, and Billy the Kid are brought together.

== Production ==
The production used sets, stock footage, and props left over from the large number of period dramas made by the 20th Century Fox film company. Even black-and-white shots purporting to show the Titanic sinking were tinted for use in this color production. Only a few actors were costumed for a given episode, interspersed with cuts of great masses of people similarly dressed from original features. Only one set was constructed for the show, that of the Time Tunnel's main control room. For the pilot episode, a large control-room set was built, and a longer Time Tunnel was created using optical matte shots. After the pilot episode, location changes occurred for the production of the series; Colbert and Darren shot their scenes in another studio, on the 20th Century Fox backlot, or on location, while those who portrayed the Time Tunnel personnel filmed all their scenes on a revised and smaller Time Tunnel control-room set (due to the production having to use a smaller sound stage than used during the pilot filming). Some episodes featured space aliens who wore costumes and carried props originally created for other Irwin Allen television and film productions. Prop sets were similarly reused. The prop computer, however, had an unusual degree of verisimilitude because it was an array of memory modules from the Air Force's recently decommissioned SAGE computer.

Continuity errors and errors in historical fact occurred in the series. In the premiere episode, "Rendezvous with Yesterday", Captain Smith of the Titanic is called Malcolm, when historically, his name was Edward. The names of the secondary officers are also fictitious, though Walter Lord's best-selling nonfiction book about the event, A Night to Remember, had been released nine years earlier.

The music for the opening and closing credits heard in each episode of the series was composed by John Williams (credited, as in Lost in Space, as "Johnny Williams"). GNP Crescendo later released an album featuring Williams' work and the score composed by George Duning for the episode "The Death Merchant".

The series won an Emmy Award in 1967, for Individual Achievements in Cinematography. The award went to L. B. "Bill" Abbott, for his photographic special effects.

== Recurring elements ==
- A short "teaser" from the following week's episode was shown at the end of each episode as Doug and Tony arrived at their next destination, with one exception: episode three's ending has a quasi-teaser before the true ending teaser. This is a scene where Tony lands 10 years before 1968 in the desert, at the Time Tunnel complex. He tries to tell Doug that he works there, and he knows him. This was probably used just to fill out time for the episode since it is followed by a normal teaser for the next episode.
- The introduction to the scale of the project (over 36,000 people and huge underground buildings) is never seen after the first episode except for two clips of the giant power generator flashing, and tunnel security running across a walkway. New matte paintings and models were created specifically for The Time Tunnel pilot episode.
- Most episodes involved the capture or detention of Doug, Tony, or both, their escape, their recapture, and their escape again, before their move to the next episode.
- Nearly all location shooting was filmed in and around Southern California. This caused scenes set in different parts of the country (or the world) to have the same general hilly landscape with arid-type trees and brush typical to the local region where filming occurred.
- The majority of episodes placed Tony and Doug in stories set in past historical contexts.
- Aliens and people from the future were similarly dressed, often in metallic silver clothing, like other Irwin Allen television series of the same era.
- Many episodes used stock footage from previous 20th Century-Fox and Irwin Allen productions. These shots ran the gamut from episodes on General Custer, to the sinking of the Titanic, and many other historical events.

== Episodes ==
While the episodes were first shown in 1966, the show's setting begins in 1968, two years into the then-future.

No.	Title	Arrival date	Directed by	Written by	Arrival location	Original release date
1	"Rendezvous with Yesterday"	April 13, 1912	Irwin Allen	S : Irwin Allen; S/T : Shimon Wincelberg and Harold Jack Bloom	RMS Titanic	September 9, 1966
U.S. Senator Leroy Clark (Gary Merrill) arrives in Arizona to evaluate Project Tic-Toc, which is researching time travel. Dr. Doug Phillips ushers Clark into a subterranean complex where he meets Lt. General Heywood Kirk. As chairman of the Senate oversight committee, Clark can either authorize or end the Time Tunnel funding. To prove time travel is possible, Dr. Tony Newman secretly enters the Tunnel and lands aboard the Titanic the day before it sinks. Doug later follows Tony into the past in an attempt to rescue him. Doug finds Tony and they enter the wireless room to send an SOS message, though the ship's crew apprehends them. When the ship strikes an iceberg as Tony and Doug predicted, the captain (Michael Rennie) orders the "abandon ship" procedure. Thrown off the ship by an explosion, Tony and Doug are successfully suspended in time by the Time Tunnel team. Senator Clark gives assurances that funding will continue as the time team attempt to rescue Tony and Doug. The DVD release included the series' original "pilot" that runs about 53 minutes rather than the standard 49 minutes. Deleted material was added to two subsequent episodes.
2	"One Way to the Moon"	1978	Harry Harris	William Welch	Spacecraft	September 16, 1966
Tony and Doug land aboard a spacecraft's service module just before blast-off. The spacecraft, part of the M.E.M. (Mars Excursion Module) ten years in Tony and Doug's future, will be the first U.S. crewed spaceflight to Mars. The crew then lands on the Moon to refuel and continue the mission. Tony and Doug are discovered and considered spies. Back at the Time Tunnel complex, three M.E.M. officers arrive: Killian (Barry Kelley), Brandon (Ross Elliott), and Beard (James T. Callahan). Brandon and Beard are spies, and Brandon sabotages the Time Tunnel control panel. When Brandon is exposed and tries to escape, Beard fatally shoots him. Tony and Doug, left on the Moon, are safely time shifted.
3	"End of the World"	May 21, 1910	Sobey Martin	S : Peter Germano; S/T : William Welch	A mining community	September 23, 1966
The Time Tunnel control room monitor Halley's Comet's 1910 return that caused worldwide panic after Tony and Doug are relocated there. They attempt to organize a rescue party for over 200 miners trapped in a mine cave-in. The townspeople have departed to await the end of the world that Prof. Ainsley (Gregory Morton), an astronomer at a nearby observatory, has predicted. Doug convinces Ainsley that his calculations were wrong, and together they convince townspeople that the world will not end. The miners are saved. Tony and Doug vanish into oblivion together, but are separated briefly: Tony ending up outside Project Tic-Tok in 1958 before then shortly being sent on to reunite with Doug passing through time again.
4	"The Day the Sky Fell In"	December 6, 1941	William Hale	Ellis St. Joseph	Honolulu, Hawaii	September 30, 1966
Tony and Doug arrive inside the Japanese consulate in Honolulu the day before the attack on Pearl Harbor. As a young boy, Tony was living in Honolulu at that time. Tony's father (Linden Chiles), a lieutenant commander in the United States Navy, was never seen after the attack. When the adult Tony tries warning his father of the impending attack, he dismisses the danger. Tony finally helps his father transmit a warning to a doomed ship. The elder Newman then dies in his son's arms.
5	"The Last Patrol"	January 6, 1815	Sobey Martin	Bob and Wanda Duncan	near New Orleans, Louisiana	October 7, 1966
Tony and Doug arrive in Louisiana the day before the final battle of the War of 1812. They are captured as spies and sentenced to execution. A present-day British Army officer, General Southall (Carroll O'Connor), is brought to the Time Tunnel so the team can establish Tony and Doug's location. General Southall insists he go back in time to order Colonel Southall, his ancestor, to release Tony and Doug and learn why he led his troops into the opposing army's strongest point. Note: This episode said that the battle occurred on January 7; it actually occurred on January 8.
6	"Crack of Doom"	August 27, 1883	William Hale	William Welch	Krakatoa in Maritime Southeast Asia	October 14, 1966
Tony and Doug arrive on Krakatoa island the day it erupts in August 1883. Karnutu (Victor Lundin), the chief guide, believes Doug and Tony are devils causing the eruption and tries sacrificing them to stop it. Doug and Tony only have a few hours to convince scientists (Ellen Burstyn and Torin Thatcher) to leave the island before the biggest eruption in recorded history. Karnutu is thwarted and falls into the lava pit. Doug and Tony persuade the scientists and the remaining guides to escape to Sumatra. The Time Tunnel team shifts Tony and Doug just before the big eruption. Note: It is revealed in this episode that moving in time is all a matter of rapid acceleration.
7	"Revenge of the Gods"	April 23, 1184 BC	Sobey Martin	William Read Woodfield and Allan Balter	Near Troy in Anatolia	October 21, 1966
Tony and Doug arrive near the city of Troy after the tenth year of the siege by the Achaeans (Mycenaean Greekss). Ulysses (John Doucette), the Greek commander, takes Doug and Tony to be gods from Olympus to the disgust of Sardis (Joseph Ruskin), one of Ulysses's commanders. Doug is captured and tortured in Troy. Tony distinguishes himself in a battle against the Trojans. Tony joins the Greeks in the Trojan Horse to capture and sack Troy. Both Sardis and Paris (Paul Carr) are killed, and Queen Helen (Dee Hartford) and Doug are rescued.
8	"Massacre"	June 24, 1876	Murray Golden	Carey Wilber	Big Horn County, Montana Territory	October 28, 1966
Tony and Doug land in 1876 Montana the day before the Battle of the Little Bighorn. Chief Crazy Horse captures Tony, but Doug and a soldier escape. Tony demonstrates his bravery to Sitting Bull, moving him to adopt Tony. Doug and Tim make their way to the 7th Cavalry. Doug is unable to convince Lt. Colonel George Armstrong Custer to rescue Tony or reconsider his plan to fight the Sioux at the Little Big Horn. The Time Tunnel team brings back warrior Yellow Elk, who Crazy Horse sent to thwart Sitting Bull's plan to send a peace offer to Custer. Yellow Elk is stopped from ambushing Tony on his way to Custer with the offer. Later, Yellow Elk prevents Tony and Doug being killed just before they discover the outcome of "Custer's Last Stand".
9	"Devil's Island"	March 14, 1895	Jerry Hopper	Bob and Wanda Duncan	Devil's Island in South America	November 11, 1966
Tony and Doug arrive on the French penal colony of Devil's Island just as new prisoners arrive. They are mistaken for two prisoners who have escaped and are imprisoned in their stead. The other prisoners are uninterested in escape until Captain Alfred Dreyfus (Ted Roter) arrives on the island, but this is part of the French government's scheme to eliminate Dreyfus by killing him if he attempts to escape.
10	"Reign of Terror"	October 8, 1793	Sobey Martin	William Welch	Paris, France	November 18, 1966
Tony and Doug arrive in Paris, France, in the middle of the French Revolution. A shopkeeper offers to help them leave the city if they will help him free Marie Antoinette. Instead, they help the Dauphin, Louis XVII, to escape with the shopkeeper as his guide and protector. Tony and Doug are confronted by an ancestor of General Kirk, who is a dead ringer for him. The ancestor, General Querque, seeks to use the ring as evidence to incriminate Marie Antoinette and lead to her execution. Doug and Tony distract a young artillery lieutenant, Napoléon Bonaparte, so the shopkeeper and the dauphin can board a ship taking them to freedom. Doug and Tony are transferred to another time period just moments before being shot. Note: This episode said that Marie Antoinette was executed shortly after noon on October 15; the execution actually took place on October 16.
11	"Secret Weapon"	June 16, 1956	Sobey Martin	Theodore Apstein	Southeastern Europe	November 25, 1966
A general in The Pentagon takes advantage of Tony and Doug's arriving at a certain time and location to send them on a spy mission. They are sent a message to meet a contact who will take them to a secret Soviet project, A-13, a project similar to Project Tic-Toc, though not yet fully functional. Also, the project's chief scientist (Nehemiah Persoff) is currently (in 1968) defecting to the United States. Tony and Doug pose as scientists and return valuable information on the project and the defector.
12	"The Death Trap"	February 21, 1861	William Hale	Leonard Stadd	Baltimore, Maryland	December 2, 1966
Tony and Doug land in 19th century Baltimore, Maryland amid an Abolitionist plot to assassinate President-elect Abraham Lincoln (Ford Rainey). Ringleader Jeremiah Gebhardt (Scott Marlowe) has constructed a time bomb to plant on Lincoln's train. When Lincoln's train arrives at the abandoned depot, Jeremiah investigates. Detective Allan Pinkerton (R.G. Armstrong) interrogates Doug as Lincoln's train arrives at the depot. After Pinkerton delays Lincoln's train due to the assassination plot, Jeremiah decides to bomb the depot.
13	"The Alamo"	1836	Sobey Martin	Bob and Wanda Duncan	The Alamo Mission	December 9, 1966
Tony and Doug land in 19th-century Texas, just outside the Alamo. Captain Reynerson (John Lupton) beckons Tony and Doug to the fort to evade Mexican soldiers. Commander Colonel William B. Travis (Rhodes Reason) ignores Tony's warning of Santa Anna's impending attack. Tony and Doug are locked in a storeroom after Doug sustains a blow to the head. At the Time Tunnel complex, Dr. Swain obtains a strong "transfer fix" for Doug, but instead picks up Col. Travis, who is shown the onscreen fall of the Alamo, along with his own death. Tony and Doug are safely shifted to a different time.
14	"Night of the Long Knives"	Mid May 1886	Paul Stanley	William Welch	Thar Desert in India	December 16, 1966
Tony and Doug arrive in the Thar desert, where Doug is immediately captured by Afghanistan rebels. Tony is shot and presumed dead, but is found by Rudyard Kipling and taken to the local British fort. Rebellion against the British occupiers is rising, and the local commander has been ordered to not attack the rebels. However, one of the scientists has escaped and must convince the British to attack the rebels, freeing Dr. Phillips and stopping the Night Of The Long Knives, the signal to begin the general uprising.
15	"Invasion"	June 4, 1944	Sobey Martin	Bob and Wanda Duncan	Cherbourg, France	December 23, 1966
Two nights before the D-Day invasion of Europe, Tony and Doug witness the French Resistance's attack on a Nazi installation. Nazis capture Tony and Doug and take them to Gestapo headquarters, where Doug is to serve as a guinea pig for a brainwashing experiment to kill Tony. Tony makes his way from the Gestapo headquarters and is captured by the French Resistance leader.
16	"The Revenge of Robin Hood"	June 14, 1215	William Hale	Leonard Stadd	King John's Castle, England	December 30, 1966
Tony arrives in a dungeon. The Earl of Huntingdon, formerly Robin Hood (Donald Harron), is petitioning King John (John Crawford) to sign the Magna Carta, or the barons (who have raised armies) will overthrow the king. Doug arrives outside the throne room and overhears the end of the conversation. They meet in the dungeon and overcome the guards. Tony and Doug escape, but Huntingdon does not. On their way to warn the barons, Tony and Doug are captured by the Merry Men. After escaping the king's men, rescuing the Earl of Huntingdon and kidnapping the king, the episode ends with King John reluctantly signing the Magna Carta.
17	"Kill Two by Two"	February 17, 1945	Herschel Daugherty	Bob and Wanda Duncan	Minami Iwo	January 6, 1967
Tony and Doug arrive about 700 miles southeast of Tokyo, Japan in the South Pacific, two days before the Battle of Iwo Jima. They overpower the observer on the island to radio the position of the U.S. Navy ships. They are captured when Lieutenant Nakamura (Mako) surprises them. He surprisingly offers them an opportunity to capture or kill the Japanese soldiers. Nakamura gives Doug and Tony a one-hour head start but no weapons. Tony has a badly sprained ankle, so Doug sneaks back and takes five grenades from the supply room. The two sides play a dangerous game of cat and mouse, but Lieutenant Nakamura seems strangely suicidal.
18	"Visitors from Beyond the Stars"	1885	Sobey Martin	Bob and Wanda Duncan	In space above Mullins, Arizona Territory	January 13, 1967
Tony and Doug arrive on an alien spacecraft in space above the Americas in 1885. Two aliens soon appear and force Tony and Doug into a translation chamber. The aliens intend to take over the earth and almost succeed. Doug is under the aliens' control. Tony needs the sheriff's and the bar owner's help to take the aliens' control unit from them. Meanwhile, two other aliens appear in the Time Tunnel control room and demand the team prove that their alien ship was not destroyed, or face destruction of the Earth. After being shown an image of the ship leaving Earth safely, the aliens leave. This episode makes use of Bernard Herrmann's music from the film The Day the Earth Stood Still and 'high tech sci-fi' sound effects from the film Forbidden Planet.
19	"The Ghost of Nero"	October 23, 1915	Sobey Martin	Leonard Stadd	Italian Alps in Villa Galba, Northern Italy	January 20, 1967
Tony and Doug arrive at the Italian Alps during World War I, and enter the cellar to avoid an artillery bombardment. Tony and Doug hide and accidentally find a secret passage to the estate's upper floors, where the owner, Count Galba (a descendant of the same named Roman Emperor), offers to protect them from the Germans. The ghost of Nero possesses a German officer and tries to kill the nobleman by possessing Tony. Project HQ utilizes the services of a paranormal researcher Dr. Steinholtz (John Hoyt), who suggests zapping Tony with 1,000,000 volts of electricity for one millisecond through the Tunnel to force the ghost out. Nero is transported instead and almost destroys HQ before the scientists can send him back. Eventually, Nero's ghost binds itself to Corporal Benito Mussolini.Tony and Doug are "switched". Note: Italy declared war on Austria-Hungary in May 1915, but it was not until August 1916 that Italy declared war on Germany. Count Galba also appeals to Nero for help against the "Huns", a common nickname for the Germans in WWI, but the real Huns invaded Italy four centuries after Nero's demise. This episode makes frequent use of Bernard Herrmann's music from the film The Day the Earth Stood Still.
20	"The Walls of Jericho"	1550 BC	Nathan Juran	Ellis St. Joseph	Near Jericho in the West Bank	January 27, 1967
Tony and Doug arrive outside of the tent of Joshua during the night, two days before the Israelite siege of Jericho ends. Doug is captured and sent to the dungeon to be tortured as an Israelite spy. Tony rescues Doug from the dungeon, and they take refuge at a safe house, but a servant betrays them for a reward. The walls of the city fall as what appears to be a tornado traces the destruction. Tony and Doug are transported to a new era. Special note: In some time zones, during the original broadcast of this episode, the program was interrupted by an ABC News Bulletin regarding the death of three astronauts (Virgil "Gus" Grissom, Edward White and Roger Chaffee) in a fire in the Apollo 1 command module, while preparing for launch of the first Apollo space mission, on the launch pad at the Kennedy Space Center. In other time zones, the interruption came while Rango was airing.
21	"Idol of Death"	October 2, 1519	Sobey Martin	Bob and Wanda Duncan	near Veracruz, Mexico	February 3, 1967
Hernán Cortés (Anthony Caruso) has captured the royal family of the Tlaxcalan people of Mexico during the Spanish conquest of the Aztec Empire. Doug and Tony arrive before the torture begins and are captured trying to save the royals. Once Cortés gets the information he wants, he kills the king and queen but keeps the timid royal heir alive for the moment. While Cortés is away watching the burning of his ships to prevent the rebellion of his troops, a member of the tribe frees the royal heir as well as Tony and Doug. The four of them try to retrieve the mask before the Spaniards gain it.
22	"Billy the Kid"	April 23, 1881	Nathan Juran	William Welch	Lincoln, New Mexico Territory	February 10, 1967
Tony and Doug arrive in Lincoln, New Mexico Territory. Billy the Kid (Robert Walker Jr.) pursues Tony and Doug and catches them in an abandoned shack outside of town. Before Doug and Tony can be shot, Lt. General Heywood Kirk sends an audio transmission to the room stating that Billy is surrounded by law enforcement. Tony and Doug manage to overpower Billy and tie him up. Tony goes back to town to get help from the sheriff, but is mistaken for the Kid and arrested. Billy demands a showdown in the streets, but Sheriff Pat Garrett and Doug arrive and save him. Garrett arrests Billy and his cohort, and Tony and Doug are "switched" to a new point in time.
23	"Pirates of Deadman's Island"	April 9, 1805	Sobey Martin	Barney Slater	Near the Barbary Coast of Africa	February 17, 1967
Tony and Doug arrive somewhere in the Mediterranean on a pirate ship during the First Barbary War and are captured and taken to an island. Captain Beal (Victor Jory), a Barbary pirate, orders that the strangers be shot. The Time Tunnel personnel accidentally transfer Captain Beal back to HQ, where he kidnaps Ann. She persuades him to go back to his ship, where he is intentionally killed by one of his own crew. The newly retired Time Tunnel staff doctor, Dr. Benjamin Berkhart (Regis Toomey), insists on going back to save Tony and Doug, and help the wounded American sailors. Tony and Doug are switched to their next adventure. Note: This is the last episode to have the opening narration.
24	"Chase Through Time"	1547 and two other time periods	Sobey Martin	Carey Wilber	Grand Canyon, a futuristic beehive community, a Pleistocene rainforest	February 24, 1967
Tony and Doug arrive near the Grand Canyon, Arizona, in 1547. Back at HQ, a spy (Robert Duvall) for an unspecified country or organization has planted a nuclear bomb somewhere in the complex. The Tunnel had been tuned to the location of Doug and Tony, so the spy also arrives near the Grand Canyon. Tony and Doug are told they must apprehend the spy and get him to tell them the location of the bomb. But the lock on the time period drifts and moves the spy to another time, so Tony and Doug are sent after him. This episode also makes use of music from The Day the Earth Stood Still and 'high tech sci-fi' sound effects from Forbidden Planet, along with 'dinosaur' scenes lifted from Allen's The Lost World.
25	"The Death Merchant"	July 2, 1863	Nathan Juran	Bob and Wanda Duncan	Adams County, Pennsylvania	March 3, 1967
Tony and Doug arrive amid the Battle of Gettysburg during the American Civil War. Tony is knocked out by an artillery blast. Doug retreats from the battlefield with a small group of Union soldiers. The commander has him wear a Union uniform to avoid being shot. The Time Tunnel team remotely revive Tony and he is found by Confederate soldiers. Suffering from amnesia, Tony takes Doug prisoner and they fight, which results in Tony regaining his memory. The Time Tunnel transfers Machiavelli (Malachi Throne) back to his own time and Tony and Doug to a new adventure.
26	"Attack of the Barbarians"	1287	Sobey Martin	Robert Hamner	East Asia	March 10, 1967
Doug and Tony arrive somewhere in Mongolia or Eastern China. Mongols capture and take them to Batu Khan (Arthur Batanides). Batu, a grandson of Genghis Khan, feels he is the rightful heir of Genghis, but must defeat Kublai Khan. Doug is believed dead, and Tony is tortured on the rack for information about a nearby enemy fortress. Batu's forces launch a massive assault on the fortress. Doug and Tony make artillery shells by mixing gunpowder and potassium nitrate in empty water jugs. General Kirk is able to send back igniters to make the bombs successful. The tide is turned in the battle, and Tony and Doug are relocated. Note: This episode is supposed to take place in 1287, but Batu Khan died in 1259, when Marco Polo was 5 years old, 12 years before Marco began his travels to the Orient.
27	"Merlin the Magician"	544	Harry Harris	William Welch	Cornwall, England	March 17, 1967
Merlin the magician appears in Time Tunnel HQ and freezes the personnel. He then brings Tony and Doug out of their "time limbo" (between destinations) back to the Time Tunnel control room in suspended animation so that he can instruct them to do what he asks, though they may die in the effort. He then sends them to Cornwall in the year 544. There, they fight off a band of Vikings and encounter a young man named Arthur Pendragon whose father has been killed by the Viking raiders. Merlin appears and orders Tony and Doug to protect Arthur at all costs. Arthur declares he will make Doug and Tony his first knights, but they are transferred by the Tunnel. Note: The episode places Vikings in England approximately 250 years before the Viking Age and their first recorded appearance in the British Isles. Historians date the beginning of the Viking Age as 8 June 793, the day of the first Viking raid on the abbey on Lindisfarne.
28	"The Kidnappers"	8433	Sobey Martin	William Welch	Planet orbiting Canopus	March 24, 1967
An alien time traveler from the future called OTT (acronym for "Official Time Traveler") (played by Del Monroe) appears in the Time Tunnel control room and abducts Dr. Ann MacGregor. Ray discovers a metal punched card presumably dropped by OTT that has a set of space-time coordinates. Kirk directs Ray to transfer Doug and Tony to those coordinates, which place them on a planet in the system of the star Canopus in the year 8433 A.D. They are in a futuristic complex run by a curator (Michael Ansara), who has begun to compile all the data of the history of the Earth by extracting the memories of all its historical figures. When the curator and the guards go dormant at night, Doug, Tony and Ann remain awake to retrieve the time-space converter and escape. They outwit and kill OTT, who by a power pack remains awake to patrol the alien complex; Ann sends herself back to the Time Tunnel control room with the converter by way of the alien time machine, and Doug and Tony are transferred away in the nick of time. This episode also makes use of Bernard Herrmann's music from the film The Day the Earth Stood Still. Note: This episode gives the distance to Canopus as 98 light years, a distance thought likely in 1967, whereas it is now known to be 310 ± 20 light years.
29	"Raiders from Outer Space"	November 2, 1883	Nathan Juran	Bob and Wanda Duncan	Near Khartoum, Sudan	March 31, 1967
Tony and Doug arrive in the middle of the Siege of Khartoum between British and Arab forces in the Sudan. This chapter is loosely based on the campaign of General Gordon. In their efforts to hide from the battling armies, they encounter two aliens who take them prisoner. The alien leader (from Aristos) then contacts the Time Tunnel control center and tells them not to interfere. Unable to attack the aliens effectively with the resources at hand, Tony, Doug, and the British soldier fetch grenades and gunpowder from Khartoum. They attack the alien base, but have insufficient resources left to destroy it. However, just before the bomb explodes in the Time Tunnel control room, the Time Tunnel transfers the bomb to the alien base, destroying it a few minutes later. Note: The Battle of Khartoum was fought in 1884−1885.
30	"Town of Terror"	September 10, 1978	Herschel Daugherty	Carey Wilber	Fictional town of Cliffport, Maine	April 7, 1967
Tony and Doug arrive in a hotel cellar containing sophisticated equipment. When they get to the lobby of the hotel, the proprietor (played by Mabel Albertson) tells them that there is no cellar. When they attempt to show her, she immobilizes them. The Time Tunnel frees them from their immobilization by moving them. Doug and Tony flee and are pursued. A force field around the town prevents their escape, but two young people—Joan (Heather Young) and Pete (Gary Haynes)—soon encounter them. Tony and Doug find out that the townspeople have been immobilized and aliens are using the forms of the townspeople to appear as humans. The aliens are planning to transport all of the oxygen from Earth's atmosphere to their atmosphere-poor home planet of Andros. The aliens also start sucking oxygen out of the Time Tunnel headquarters, nearly asphyxiating the staff. Doug and Tony successfully destroy the alien control room, destroying their ability to remove Earth's oxygen, freeing the townspeople and saving Time Tunnel personnel.

== Cancellation ==
Although The Time Tunnel was scheduled on Fridays (often considered the "Friday night death slot" for TV programs), the ratings for the series were solid. ABC pointed to The Time Tunnel as one of the few successes in a disastrous schedule.

A series titled The Legend of Custer was lobbied to drop The Time Tunnel in favor of Custer. The network headquarters gave green light for Custer, and The Time Tunnel was cancelled.

The Legend of Custer was itself cancelled after airing 17 low-rated episodes, skewered by critics and performed worse than The Time Tunnel.

== In other media ==
=== Tie-in novels ===
In January 1967 a promotional novel, The Time Tunnel, was published by Pyramid Books. Its author Murray Leinster, had written a novel of the same name in 1964 entirely unrelated to the television series.

Leinster used four of the main characters: Tony Newman, Doug Phillips, General Kirk, and Ann MacGregor and initial antagonist Senator Clark. Unlike in the television series, Project Tic-Toc is secretly founded and financed through the Defense Department without the consent of Congress. General Kirk is a retired Air Force General rather than an active duty Army General. Also differing from the series, Senator Clark here demands the end of Project Tic-Toc out of fear of grandfather paradox which could result in the erasure of the current timeline. The action takes place during the Johnstown Flood of May 31, 1889, where the traveler's save Clark's grandmother, Julie Bowen, and the Texas prairie near Adobe Walls, Texas, on June 26, 1874, prior to the historic battle on June 27. Lastly, they visit Saint Louis, Missouri, sometime in the distant future. during an alien invasion. In the Saint Louis library Doug discovers that he will marry Ann MacGregor. They then return to the present.

This was followed, also in 1967, by Timeslip: Time Tunnel Adventure #2, written again by Murray Leinster. The front and back covers feature photos from the series. In the novel an experimental nuclear missile is sent through the Time Tunnel, but lands up at the bottom of a pond in Mexico City, in the 1840s. Newman and Phillips are sent out to make the event "unhappen".

=== Comic books ===
A short-lived comic book was published by Gold Key Comics (Western Publishing Co.) in 1966–1967. These were reprinted by Hermes Press in 2012. In the first issue, the travelers meet Abraham Lincoln on the day of his assassination, then visit Pompeii in 79 A.D, then visit 1980 when a trip Mars takes place. In the second issue, the travelers visit D-Day 1944 and discover Nazis armed with weapons from the future, then visit Custer in 1876 on the day of his death.

=== DVD releases ===
20th Century Fox Home Entertainment released the entire series on DVD in Region 1 in 2006 in two volumes. Volume Two includes the unaired 2002 pilot and the made-for-TV film Time Travelers as special features. The DVD box sets include nearly all full-length, uncut and unedited original network prints, but one episode, "Chase Through Time", was edited.

In Region 2, Revelation Films released the entire series on DVD in the UK in one complete series box set.

In Region 4, Madman Entertainment released the complete series on DVD in Australia on August 20, 2014.

=== Blu-ray releases ===
In Region B, Revelation Films has released the entire series on Blu-ray in the UK in one set. Though made for the UK, the Blu-ray set is in fact all-region and plays in US players.

=== Record album ===
The Time Tunnel ABC-TV Japanese book with record album was released in 1967. 33⅓ RPM record was licensed and manufactured for exclusive release in Japan by Asahi Sonorama company and was released during the show's original airing. The record is pressed in blue-vinyl and contains the time-travel drama "Adventure in the Lost World". The highlight of this package is the colorful 12-page booklet which showcases original storybook artwork of the record's episode with the intrepid time travelers being terrorized by rampaging dinosaurs and angry cavemen.

=== Soundtrack albums ===
An album of music from the series, featuring the episodes "Rendezvous With Yesterday" (tracks 2-4) and "The Death Merchant" (tracks 5 and 6) was released by GNP Crescendo as part of the collection The Fantasy Worlds of Irwin Allen.

In 2021, La-La Land Records released two three-CD volumes of music from every episode of the series, including music cues.

==== Episodes with original music ====
Listed in production order.

- "Rendezvous with Yesterday" (John Williams)
- "End of the World" (Lyn Murray)
- "One Way to the Moon" (Lyn Murray)
- "Revenge of the Gods" (Leith Stevens)
- "Secret Weapon" (Paul Sawtell)
- "The Day the Sky Fell In" (Paul Sawtell)
- "The Last Patrol" (Lyn Murray)
- "Crack of Doom" (Robert Drasnin)
- "Massacre" (Joseph Mullendore)
- "Reign of Terror" (Leith Stevens)
- "The Death Trap" (Robert Drasnin)
- "The Death Merchant" (George Duning)

=== Games ===
The Time Tunnel boxed board game from Ideal Toys (No. 2326-7) was released in 1966. The playing board design shows characters and events from the prehistoric era into the future. The box insert has a spinner board and other parts include playing cards, tokens, and marker disks. The second game is The Time Tunnel: Spin-To-Win, a 1967 boxed board game from Pressman Toys, which features a box insert playing board that has a tunnel-like design representing different past years in history and plastic tops are spun on the playing board to determine "Time Travels".

Bally Manufacturing created a pinball machine called Time Tunnel in 1971 based loosely on the TV series, but production was stopped due to copyright infringement. The game was re-released with revised artwork as Space Time.

=== Other merchandise ===
- The Time Tunnel coloring book
- The Time Tunnel Viewmaster set – Saalfield #9561, 1966A story book to color, 80 pages, Sawyer #B491, 1966. Three Viewmaster slides from "Rendezvous With Yesterday" and 16-page story booklet that tells the pilot episode.

=== Audio drama ===
Big Finish Productions released a box set of audio dramas, entitled Irwin Allen's The Time Tunnel: The Nightmare Begins in February 2025. A second release entitled Irwin Allen's The Time Tunnel: The Dimensions of Time scheduled for November of that year. This acts as a sequel to the original 1960s series.

== After the original run ==
In 1982, five feature-length television films were assembled from 10 complete individual episodes with portions of the first episode as introductory material. Aliens from Another Planet, was produced using episodes 24 ("Chase Through Time") and 18 ("Visitors from Beyond the Stars"). Revenge of the Gods was a compilation of episodes 7 ("Revenge of the Gods") and 20 ("The Walls of Jericho"). Old Legends Never Die edited together episodes 27 ("Merlin the Magician") and 16 ("The Revenge of Robin Hood"). Kill or Be Killed comprised episodes 4 ("The Day the Sky Fell In") and 17 ("Kill Two by Two"). Raiders from Outer Space was compiled from episodes 28 ("The Kidnappers") and 2 ("One Way to the Moon"). The five "films" were made available to tv stations to fit either a 2-hour slot (100 minutes) or a 90-minute slot (75 minutes), with different edits for time.

== Remakes ==
To date, three attempts have been made to resurrect the show. Two produced a pilot episode, and another got no further than a script.

=== 2002 remake ===
In 2002, Fox showed interest in remaking this series. A pilot was produced by Twentieth Century Fox Television, Fox Television Studios, and Regency Television in association with Irwin Allen Properties. Kevin Burns and Jon Jashni were executive producers. Sheila Allen was credited as one of the producers. The series was not ordered by Fox so as to make room in its schedule for Joss Whedon's Firefly.

The pilot had a darker and more serious tone than the original 1966 series. Doug Phillips (David Conrad) is the main character, and the other is Toni Newman (Andrea Roth). The unaired pilot episode is available on DVD from Fox Home Entertainment on The Time Tunnel: Volume Two.

In this remake, the 2002 Time Tunnel is a Department of Energy research project into nuclear fusion, which produces nearly limitless energy. When the reactor was initiated (not shown in the episode), that caused an unintended "time storm" which uncontrollably changed history. The DOE was able to anchor one end of the storm by using the Tunnel like a lightning rod.

On their way into the tunnel complex, Flynn tells Doug Phillips, a former friend, that the latter has been recruited because he has a detailed knowledge of the Battle of Hürtgen Forest. The head of the Time Tunnel project likens their team to FEMA—they don't send a team back for a rain storm but they do for hurricanes. However, they can only go through time to where the other end of the storm is at the current moment, so they have a limited period to fix what is wrong and to be retrieved by the Time Tunnel.

The team (Doug, Toni, Flynn, J.D., and Wix) must travel to the Battle of Hürtgen Forest in 1944 Germany during World War II. They plan to retrieve a person moved there by the time storm from 1546. During the mission, Doug Phillips meets his grandfather, a soldier who will be killed in the battle. Doug knows this, but cannot tell his ancestor and save his life because it would change history. Toni Newman tells Doug she used to have three brothers and two sisters before the time storm accident but is now an only child. The time travelers learn the displaced person is a now-confused medieval monk who carries bubonic plague. When the team is almost captured, two members switch to German uniforms and pretend to be Colonel Klink and (Sergeant) Schultz, complete with fake documents. Everyone who came in contact with the monk is given an antibiotic injection and the time ripples stop, but Flynn has been fatally stabbed, so he reveals Phillips was a lonely single man before the time storm, but he now has a family. Flynn tells Phillips this information to give him an incentive to keep the timeline intact.

=== 2006 remake ===
The SciFi Channel announced in 2005 to create a new pilot for its 2006/07 season. Allen's wife, Sheila, and two producers of the 2002 FOX remake (Kevin Burns and Jon Jashni) began work on the new pilot. John Turman (Hulk) wrote the script. The series never went beyond a pilot script.

== Parodies ==
A recurring sketch called Drunk In Time starred Alexei Sayle and Peter Capaldi as two men so inebriated that they weren't aware they were time travellers. Featuring a mock up of the original Project Tic-Toc set and animated Time Tunnel-style title sequence, the main characters are also called Doug and Tony. The six sketches featured in The All New Alexei Sayle Show in 1995.

Capaldi would later play another time traveller, the Twelfth Doctor in Doctor Who.

== See also ==
- List of time travel science fiction
- The Time Machine
- Time travel in fiction
- Tunnel Through Time
