= Paul W. Fairman =

American novelist (1909–1977)

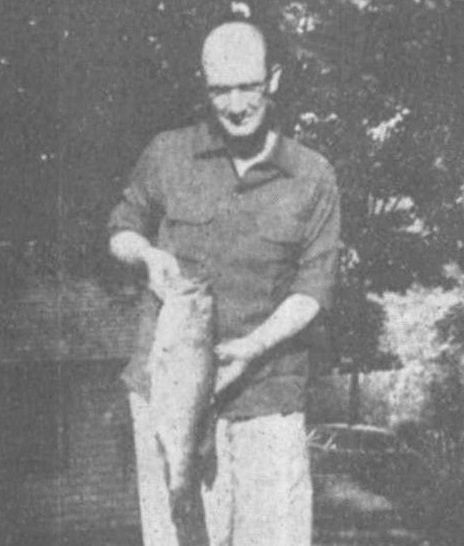
Paul W. Fairman c.1956

Paul Warren Fairman (1909–1977) was an editor and writer in a variety of genres under his own name and under pseudonyms. His detective story "Late Rain" was published in the February 1947 issue of Mammoth Detective. He published his story "No Teeth for the Tiger" in the February 1950 issue of Amazing Stories. Two years later, he was the founding editor of If, but only edited four issues. In 1955, he became the editor of Amazing Stories and Fantastic. He held that dual position until 1958. His science fiction short stories "Deadly City" and "The Cosmic Frame" were made into motion pictures.

== Career ==
Fairman left Ziff Davis, the magazines' publisher, when he was hired as managing editor of Ellery Queen's Mystery Magazine in 1958 by its new publisher B. G. Davis, who had left ZD to found his own Davis Publications, and purchased EQMM from Mercury Press as his first major act; Fairman continued till 1963. when he left to focus on writing his own work, often under different names. He ghost-wrote several juveniles, such as The Runaway Robot (1965), based on outlines by Lester del Rey, whose name appeared on the books. He also wrote the Sherlock Holmes part of Ellery Queen's A Study In Terror (1966), in which Ellery is anonymously sent a previously unknown manuscript written by John Watson, M.D.

== Movie and television adaptations ==
His short story "Deadly City", which appeared in the March 1953 issue of If magazine under the pseudonym Ivar Jorgensen, was made into the motion picture Target Earth. The story is about an alien invasion of Chicago and the evacuation of the city. The aliens had destroyed several Michigan towns, killing all the inhabitants, and had moved on to Illinois. The plot revolves around five characters who remain in the deserted city. They have to survive in a city devoid of people and facing annihilation by alien invaders.

His short story "The Cosmic Frame", published in the May 1955 Amazing Stories, was made into the 1957 science fiction movie Invasion of the Saucer Men and was remade, although uncredited, in 1965 as The Eye Creatures. The 1960 The Twilight Zone episode "People Are Alike All Over" was based upon his 1952 short story "Brothers Beyond the Void". His short story "Some Day They'll Give Us Guns" was filmed for the 1952 TV series The Unexpected, which was also known as Times Square Playhouse.

His short story "Beast of the Void" (currently available in Weird Science Fiction Tales: 101 Weird Scifi Stories Vol. 2, Civitas Library Classics) was published in 1956, and introduced the concept of amorphous intelligent matter in space capable of re-forming as perfect living copies of creatures from the memories of human explorers, including the protagonist's lost wife. (A similar theme was greatly expanded by Stanislaw Lem for his 1961 novel "Solaris", which was later filmed by Andrei Tarkovsky in 1972 and by Steven Soderbergh in 2002.)

== Novels ==
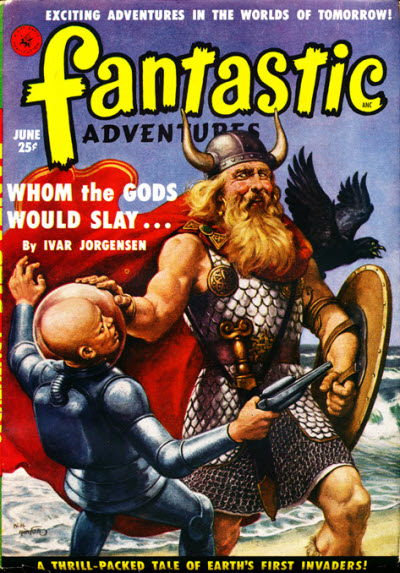
Fairman's short novel "Whom The Gods Would Slay" was the cover story in the June 1951 issue of Fantastic Adventures, but would not appear in book form until 1968

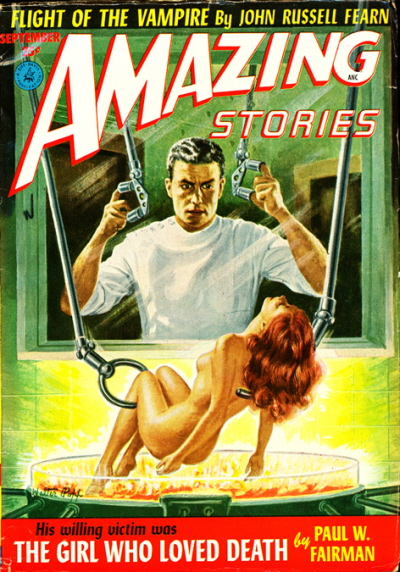
Fairman's novella "The Girl Who Loved Death" was the cover story in the September 1952 issue of Amazing Stories

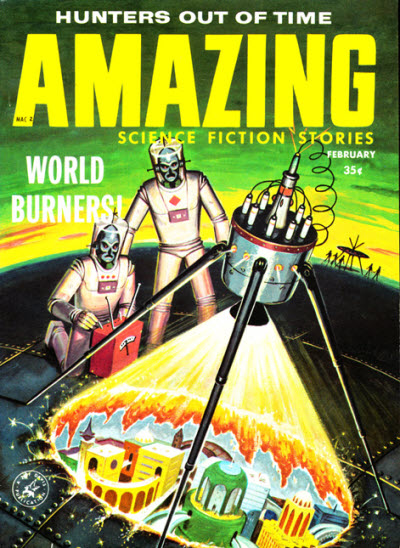
Fairman's "The World Burners" was cover-featured on the February 1959 issue of Amazing Stories

- The Glass Ladder (1950)
- Invasion From the Deep (1951)
- Rest in Agony (1963) [as by Ivar Jorgensen]
- Ten From Infinity (1963) [as by Ivar Jorgensen]
- The World Grabbers (1964)
- City Under the Sea (1965)
- The Forgetful Robot (1968)
- I, the Machine (1968)
- Whom the Gods Would Slay (1968) [as by Ivar Jorgensen]
- The Deadly Sky (1971) [as by Ivar Jorgensen]
- The Doomsday Exhibit (1971)
- That Girl (1971) [a gothic spin-off of the Marlo Thomas TV series]
- The Frankenstein Wheel (1972)
- The Diabolist (1972)
- Junior Bonner (1972), filmed as Junior Bonner (1972)
- The Girl With Something Extra (1973)

== Novels as ghost-writer ==
Fairman ghost-wrote the following novels based on extensive outlines by Lester del Rey.

- The Runaway Robot (1965)
- Rocket from Infinity (1966)
- The Infinite Worlds of Maybe (1966)
- The Scheme of Things (1966)
- Tunnel Through Time (1966)
- Siege Perilous (1966; The Man Without a Planet, 1969)
- Prisoners of Space (1968)

== Short stories ==
- Late Rain (February, 1947) Mammoth Detective
- The Body of Madelon Spain (August, 1947) Mammoth Detective
- Hallowed Be the Name (August, 1947) Mammoth Mystery
- No Hero Stuff (September, 1947) Mammoth Detective
- The Guns of God (November, 1947)'
- Bullets For Breakfast (February, 1948) Mammoth Western
- The Lady and the Lynch Mob (August, 1948) Mammoth Western
- Nesters Die Hard (November, 1948) Mammoth Western
- Dead Man's Gold (December, 1948) Mammoth Western
- The Memoirs of John Shevlin - The West’s Greatest Detective: The Case of the O’Henry Ending (December, 1949) Mammoth Western
- Devil on the Mountain (1949) Mammoth Western Quarterly
- The Broken Doll (July, 1950) Fantastic Adventures
- No Teeth for the Tiger (February, 1950) Amazing Stories
- Never Trust a Martian! (January, 1951) Amazing Stories
- Whom the Gods Would Slay (1951) [as by Ivar Jorgensen]
- Nine Worlds West (1951) [as by Clee Garson]
- Invasion from the Deep (1951)
- Witness for the Defense (1951)
- The Man with the Clutching Hand (1951)
- The Terrible Puppets (1951)
- The Man Who Stopped at Nothing (1951)
- Proud Asteroid (1951)
- Deadly Cargo (December, 1951) Fantastic Adventures
- The Missing Symbol (1952) [as by Ivar Jorgensen]
- Rest in Agony (1952) [as by Ivar Jorgensen]
- The Secret of Gallows Hill (1952)
- A Child Is Missing (1952)
- Brothers Beyond the Void (1952)
- Strange Blood (1952)
- The Dog with the Weird Tale (1952)
- The Jack of Planets (1952)
- Let's Have a Little Reverence (1952)
- "Someday They'll Give Us Guns" (1952) starring Bobby Driscoll.
- The Woman in Skin 13 (1952)
- The Third Ear (1952)
- The Girl Who Loved Death (1952)
- Deadly City (1953), filmed as Target Earth (film) (1954)
- Side Road to Glory (1953) [as by Robert Eggert Lee]
- The Cosmic Frame (1955), filmed as Invasion of the Saucer Men (1957)
- Beyond the Black Horizon (1955)
- The Smashers (1955)
- One Man to Kill (1955)
- This Is My Son (1955)
- The Man in the Ice Box (1955)
- All Walls Were Mist (1955)
- The Beasts of the Void (1956)
- Black Blockade (1956)
- Secret of the Martians (1956)
- The Treasure is Mine! (1956)
- The Beasts in the Void (1956)
- Dalrymple's Equation (1956)
- Jason and the Maker (1956)
- Traitor's Choice (1956)
- "I'll Think You Dead!" (1956)
- The Body Hunters (1959)
- The World Burners (1959)
- Give Me My Body! (1959)
- A Great Night in the Heavens (1959)
- Culture for the Planets (1968)
- Not Born to Greatness (1968)
- Delenda Est Carthago (1968)
- Interlude in the Desert (1968)
- Robots Should Stick Together (1968)
- The Pit (1968)
- The Minefield (1968)
- Mastermind of Zark (1968)
- Phantoms of Zark (1968)
- The Brown Package (1968)
- Long Hop (1968)
- The Gallant Lady (1968)
- The Space Museum (1968)
- Those Remarkable Ravencrafts (1968)
- Lost in a Junkyard (1968)

== Essays ==
- They Write . . . (1952)
- Introducing the Author: Paul W. Fairman (1956)
- A New Kind of Fiction (1957)
- Of Men and Dreams (1957)
- It Began With a Letter from the Russians (1958)
- Jehovah's Witnesses Aren't Science Fiction (1958)
