= Pohl & Kornbluth =

The writing team of Frederik Pohl and Cyril M. Kornbluth, both successful science fiction writers in their own right, produced some of the most acclaimed science fiction novels of the 1950s. They were both members of the Futurians.

Their four science fiction novels were:

- The Space Merchants (1952)
- Search the Sky (1954)
- Gladiator-At-Law (1955)
- Wolfbane (1959)

They also published two non-science-fiction novels, A Town Is Drowning and Presidential Year, under their own names, and two pulp novels, Sorority House and The Man of Cold Rages, published under the pseudonym Jordan Park.

Their short stories included:

- "Critical Mass" (1962), completed by Pohl after Kornbluth's death in 1958.
