= The Best of C. M. Kornbluth =

1976 collection of short stories by C. M. Kornbluth

- Cover of first edition
- Author: C. M. Kornbluth
- Cover artist: Gary Viskupic
- Language: English
- Series: Ballantine's Classic Library of Science Fiction
- Genre: Science fiction
- Publisher: Doubleday
- Publication date: 1976
- Publication place: United States
- Media type: Print (hardcover)
- Pages: 312
- OCLC: 2213213
- Preceded by: The Best of John W. Campbell
- Followed by: The Best of Philip K. Dick

The Best of C. M. Kornbluth is a collection of science fiction and fantasy short stories by American author C. M. Kornbluth, edited by Frederik Pohl. It was first published in hardback by Nelson Doubleday in October 1976 and in paperback by Ballantine Books in January 1977, as a volume in its Classic Library of Science Fiction. A second hardcover edition was issued by Taplinger in November 1977, and an ebook edition by Faded Page in December 2017.

== Summary ==
The book contains nineteen short works of fiction and an afterword by the author (reprinted from his 1954 collection The Explorers), together with an introduction by editor Frederik Pohl.

== Contents ==
- "An Appreciation" [introduction] (Frederik Pohl)
- "The Rocket of 1955" (from Escape, Aug. 1939)
- "The Words of Guru" (from Stirring Science Stories, Jun. 1941)
- "The Only Thing We Learn" (from Startling Stories, Jul. 1949)
- "The Adventurer" (from Space Science Fiction, May 1953)
- "The Little Black Bag" (from Astounding Science Fiction, Jul. 1950)
- "The Luckiest Man in Denv" (from Galaxy Science Fiction, Jun. 1952)
- "The Silly Season" (from The Magazine of Fantasy & Science Fiction, Fall 1950)
- "The Remorseful" (from Star Science Fiction Stories No.2, Dec. 1953)
- "Gomez" (from The Explorers, Aug. 1954)
- "The Advent on Channel Twelve" (from Star Science Fiction Stories No.4, Nov. 1958)
- "The Marching Morons" (from Galaxy Science Fiction, Apr. 1951)
- "The Last Man Left in the Bar" (from Infinity Science Fiction, Oct. 1957)
- "The Mindworm" (from Worlds Beyond, Dec. 1950)
- "With These Hands" (from Galaxy Science Fiction, Dec. 1951)
- "Shark Ship" (from Vanguard Science Fiction, Jun. 1958)
- "Friend to Man" (from 10 Story Fantasy, Spr. 1951)
- "The Altar at Midnight" (from Galaxy Science Fiction, Nov. 1952)
- "Dominoes" (from Star Science Fiction Stories, Feb. 1953)
- "Two Dooms" (from Venture Science Fiction Magazine, Jul. 1958)
- "About the Author" (from The Explorers, Aug. 1954)

== Reception ==
Lester del Rey in Analog Science Fiction/Science Fact writes that the collection indeed "includes some of [Kornbluth's] very best work, as well as a few earlier stories written before his style had fully evolved." He name checks several of the story, notably "the classic 'The Little Black Bag,' which any other writer would have turned into a long (and less forceful) novel." He concludes "I regret that a few of my favorites are not included. I'd like 'Thirteen O'Clock' and 'That Share of Glory.' But we can't have everything, and I'm glad to have so much of Cyril's writing in one book. Recommended."

Spider Robinson in Galaxy Science Fiction praises this collection, saying "I haven't enjoyed a book so much in years."

Mark Rich writes "Critics judging Kornbluth by this anthology, edited by Pohl, have seen a growing bitterness in his later stories. This reflects editorial choice more than reality, because Kornbluth also wrote delightful humor in his last years, in stories not collected here. These tales demonstrate Kornbluth's effective use of everyday individuals from a variety of ethnic backgrounds as well as his well-tuned ear for dialect."

The book was also reviewed by Michael Bishop in Delap's F & SF Review, May 1977, and Philip Stephensen-Payne in Paperback Parlour.
