= A Mile Beyond the Moon =

- Cover of the first edition
- Author: C. M. Kornbluth
- Illustrator: Remy Charlip
- Language: English
- Genre: Science fiction
- Publisher: Doubleday Books
- Publication date: 1958
- Publication place: United States
- Media type: Print (Hardcover)
- Pages: 239
- OCLC: 1196208

A Mile Beyond the Moon is a collection of science fiction stories by American writer C. M. Kornbluth, originally published as a Doubleday hardcover in 1958, shortly after Kornbluth's death. A Science Fiction Book Club edition appeared in 1959, with an abridged paperback edition following from Macfadden Books in 1962. Macfadden reissued the collection in 1966 and, as Manor Books, in 1972 and 1976. A German translation (Die Worte des Guru) appeared in 1974, and an Italian translation (Oltre la Luna) in 1987. While no further editions of the collection were published, all the stories are contained in NESFA's 1997 His Share of Glory: The Complete Short Science Fiction of C. M. Kornbluth.

== Contents ==
- "Make Mine Mars" (Science Fiction Adventures 1952)
- "The Meddlers"* (Science Fiction Adventures 1953)
- "The Events Leading Down to the Tragedy" (F&SF 1958)
- "The Little Black Bag" (Astounding 1950)
- "Everybody Knows Joe" (Fantastic Universe 1953)
- "Time Bum" (Fantastic 1953)
- "Passion Pills"* (original)
- "Virginia" (Venture 1958)
- "The Slave"* (Science Fiction Adventures 1957)
- "Kazam Collects" (Stirring Science Stories 1941)
- "The Last Man Left in the Bar" (Infinity 1947)
- "The Adventurer" (Space Science Fiction 1953)
- "The Words of Guru" (Stirring Science Stories 1941)
- "Shark Ship" (Vanguard 1958)
- "Two Dooms"* (Venture 1958)

"Kazam Collects" was originally published under the S. D. Gottesman byline. "The Words of Guru" was originally published as by Kenneth Falconer. "Shark Ship", which was first published as "Reap the Dark Tide", was nominated for the 1959 Hugo Award for Best Novelette, one of three nominations Kornbluth's work received in the year after his death. Stories marked with an asterisk* were omitted from the paperback editions.

== Reception ==
Robert Silverberg described A Mile Beyond the Moon as "an uneven collection", noting that it "represents a dozen facets of Kornbluth's writing; there are potboilers and classics here, wryly irreverent and powerfully somber pieces, straightforward ones and involutely Joycean ones". Hans Stefan Santesson recommended the collection, saying that "Kornbluth would turn a quizzical and slightly cynical eye on the frailties of the individual in that dimly sensed Tomorrow towards which we were -- and are -- moving". P. Schuyler Miller called Kornbluth "one of our greatest talents in science fiction" and described the stories as "representative of his extremely varied talent -- not as memorable as his novels, but top stuff". Frederik Pohl wrote that "What is most notable about a Kornbluth story is that his characters are always perfectly at ease in their surroundings."
