= Science Fiction Adventures =

Science Fiction Adventures may refer to one of several science fiction magazines

- Science Fiction Adventures, an American magazine published between 1952 and 1954 as one of John Raymond's science fiction magazines
- Science Fiction Adventures (1956 magazine), an American magazine published between 1956 and 1958
- Science Fiction Adventures (British magazine), a British magazine published between 1958 and 1963, initially as a reprint of the 1956 American magazine
