= Kornbluth =

Origin
- Origin: German

The name Kornbluth or Kornblut (German literally for: "grain blood") may refer to:

== People ==
- Anne Kornblut (born 1973), American journalist
- Cyril M. Kornbluth (1923–1958), American science fiction author
- Frances Kornbluth (1920-2014), American abstract expressionist painter
- Jacob Kornbluth, director
- Jesse Kornbluth (1946–2025), American magazine writer and author
- Josh Kornbluth (born 1959), American comedic monologuist
- Sally Kornbluth, eighteenth president of MIT

== Other ==
- Pohl & Kornbluth, the writing team of Frederik Pohl and Cyril M. Kornbluth
- Dr. Walter Kornbluth, fictional character in the 1984 movie Splash (film)

== See also ==
- Kornblit
