= The Marching Morons (collection) =

- Cover of the first edition
- Author: C. M. Kornbluth
- Language: English
- Genre: Science fiction
- Publisher: Ballantine Books
- Publication date: 1959
- Publication place: United States
- Media type: Print (paperback)
- Pages: 158
- OCLC: 4054077

The Marching Morons (and Other Famous Science Fiction Stories) is a collection of stories by Cyril M. Kornbluth, originally published in paperback by Ballantine Books in 1959. Ballantine reissued the collection in 1963. A Spanish translation, Desfile de Cretines, appeared in 1964. In 1972, the novella from which the collection takes its name was selected by SFWA members as one of the ten best novellas published in the genre before 1966.

== Contents ==
- "The Marching Morons" (Galaxy 1951)
- "Dominoes" (Star Science Fiction Stories No.1 1953)
- "The Luckiest Man in Denv" (Galaxy 1952)
- "The Silly Season" (F&SF 1950)
- "MS. Found in a Chinese Fortune Cookie" (F&SF 1957)
- "The Only Thing We Learn" (Startling Stories 1949)
- "The Cosmic Charge Account" (F&SF 1956)
- "I Never Ast No Favors" (F&SF 1954)
- "The Remorseful" (Star Science Fiction Stories No.2 1953)

"The Luckiest Man in Denv" was originally published under Kornbluth's "Simon Eisner" pseudonym.

== Reception ==
Amazing Stories reviewer S. E. Cotts found the stories "uniformly excellent", saying that Kornbluth "had an uncanny aim in his satire and social criticism; yet his writing was never blunt or obvious. He had a low-key way of presenting the consequences of rapid technological advance which was no less gripping for all its subtlety." P. Schuyler Miller described the stories as "a prime sample of how science fiction can probe and tease at the innards of our society, and reveal the benign and malignant growths that we pretend aren't there". Hans Stefan Santesson recommended the collection in Fantastic Universe, saying Kornbluth "was witty and he was satirical". Frederik Pohl also reviewed the book favorably, saying "What is most notable about a Kornbluth story is that his characters are always perfectly at ease in their surroundings".
