= Kornblit =

Kornblit, Korenblit, or Kornblihtt is a surname. Notable people with the surname include:

- Alberto Kornblihtt (born 1954), Argentine molecular biologist
- Alexander Tairov (born Korenblit; 1885–1950), Russian/Soviet theatre director
- Simon Kornblit (1933–2010), Belgian-born American studio executive and actor
- Zalman Kornblit, Romanian Jewish playwright

== See also ==
- Kornbluth
