= The Gene Bomb =

1996 non-fiction book by David E. Comings

- Author: David E. Comings
- Language: English
- Genre: Non-fiction
- Publisher: Hope Press
- Publication date: 1996

The Gene Bomb is a 1996 book by David E. Comings, self-published by Hope Press, that puts forth the theory that higher education and advanced technology may unintentionally favor the selection of genes that increase the likelihood of ADHD, autism, drug addiction, learning disorders, and behavior problems.

== Contents ==
Comings claims that the prevalence of intellectual disorders is rising and I.Q. is decreasing, claiming that society is inadvertently creating delays for the highly educated that reduce their reproductivity and causes them to have children later in life, thus raising the odds of certain conditions like autism.

Additionally, he claims that those having learning disorders tend to drop out of school earlier and have more children, thus passing on learning disorders at a higher rate. Environmental and societal factors are usually accepted as the cause, but Comings argues the opposite.

== Reception ==
According to a review of the book in the British Developmental Medicine and Child Neurology journal, "The arguments are developed in this book with an alarming lack of scientific accuracy and satisfactory supporting evidence." The review concludes that the book "is an apocalyptic, irrational, and emotional treatise which opens up scientifically unsound issues that have already been formally buried". A book review in the Journal of Medical Genetics said, "This is the sort of book which gets geneticists a bad name", adding that some facts "are simply wrong", while vital facts "are simply missing". Comings replied, in a Letter to the Editor, that the review "missed the whole point of the book and presented to the readers of this journal a distorted view of the issues I attempted to raise".

Other Tourette syndrome (TS) researchers say of Comings' Tourette's research that his "assertions fall outside of the mainstream of the very extensive TS literature that has developed over the past 2 decades".

== See also ==
- Dysgenics
- Idiocracy, a 2006 black comedy film that mirrors this theory.
- The Marching Morons by Cyril M. Kornbluth
