= The Wonder Effect =

1962 collection of science fiction stories by Frederik Pohl and Cyril M. Kornbluth

Cover of the first edition.

The Wonder Effect is a collection of science fiction stories by American writers Frederik Pohl and Cyril M. Kornbluth, published by Ballantine Books in 1962.

The first novelette, "Critical Mass", is a science fiction piece by Pohl and Kornbluth first published in Galaxy Science Fiction magazine in February 1962, almost four years after Kornbluth's death. According to a foreword by Pohl in the later collection Critical Mass, the story was assembled from notes Kornbluth made for three story ideas, plus one of Pohl's own from 1954. After Kornbluth's death, his widow turned over his story notes and drafts to Pohl, who completed a dozen or so stories based on this material, most of which were eventually collected in this volume and in the later Critical Mass.

== Contents ==
- "Critical Mass" (from Galaxy Science Fiction, February 1962)
- "A Gentle Dying" (Galaxy Science Fiction, June 1961)
- "Nightmare with Zeppelins" (Galaxy Science Fiction, December 1958)
- "Best Friend" (Super Science Novels, May 1941)
- "The World of Myrion Flowers" (the Magazine of Fantasy and Science Fiction, October 1961)
- "Trouble in Time" (Astonishing Stories, December 1940)
- "The Engineer" (Infinity Science Fiction, February 1956)
- "Mars-Tube" (Astonishing Stories, September 1941)
- "The Quaker Cannon" (Analog Science Fiction and Fact, August 1961)
