= Not This August =

1955 novel by Cyril M. Kornbluth

- Dust-jacket from the first edition
- Author: C.M. Kornbluth
- Cover artist: Mel Hunter
- Language: English
- Genre: Science fiction novel
- Publisher: Doubleday
- Publication date: 1955
- Publication place: United States
- Media type: Print (hardback)
- Pages: 190 pp

Not This August, also known as Christmas Eve, is a Hugo Award shortlisted science fiction novel by Cyril M. Kornbluth. It was originally published in 1955 by Doubleday. It was serialized in Maclean's magazine (Canada) in May and June 1955. A revised edition with a new foreword and afterword by Frederik Pohl was published in 1981 by Tor Books, ISBN 0-523-48518-2. The title comes from author Ernest Hemingway's "Notes on the Next War".

== Plot summary ==
In 1965, the United States and Canada have been at war with the Soviet Union and the Chinese People's Republic for three years. Both sides' atomic weapons are ineffective as surface-to-air missiles shoot down any bombers or guided missiles, so ground forces have done most of the fighting. The Communist nations—whose armies vastly outnumber the North Americans—conquered Western Europe, invaded South America, and are moving toward Texas. All American males must perform agricultural work to feed the armed forces or be drafted into military, construction, or factory service. Food, electricity, and gasoline are rationed, only two CONELRAD stations broadcast on radio, and New York City is reportedly under martial law.

Billy Justin, a 37-year-old commercial artist, and Korean War veteran, is working as a dairy farmer in Chiunga County, New York, when the radio announces that Soviet and Chinese forces have overrun the Canadian-American line at El Paso, Texas. In New Mexico, the Communist armies capture the Los Alamos National Laboratory and destroy the incomplete Yankee Doodle, a satellite capable of dropping hydrogen bombs from orbit that are impossible to shoot down.

The President of the United States surrenders to the Communists, who over the next several months partition the country at the Mississippi River and set up a joint puppet state, the North American People's Democratic Republic. Other than a military garrison, disarmament of the civilian population, searches for fissionable material, and establishing production quotas for food, the surrender of the United States leaves Chiunga Center largely untouched. The Soviets execute local fifth column members who had secretly aided the invasion to prevent them from organizing against the new government but are otherwise relatively peaceful and amenable to the black market.

A paraplegic comes to Justin's farm asking for work; he is General Hollerith, a veteran of the previous war. He and Justin join a conspiracy to finish the real satellite, a crewed space station buried in Chiunga County that the United States had been building for 15 years. It requires parts and engineering knowledge to launch. MVD troops arrive, shoot the corrupt Soviet soldiers, and are much more cruel. To Justin's knowledge, they capture all of the conspirators but himself and the general.

Justin deduces that the contacts he needs to make are in Washington, Pennsylvania. With a traveling preacher, Sparhawk, Justin walks hundreds of miles from Chiunga Center to Washington, benefiting from the Democratic Republic's policy of respecting the Americans' freedom of religion. At Washington, Justin receives instructions from the nationwide resistance movement for an attack planned for Christmas Eve on Chiunga Center to liberate the satellite.

Despite the Soviets' arrest and torture of a local farmer, they are ignorant of what "Christmas Eve", a mild oath they have heard sworn by various citizens, means until the battle begins. Coordinated by Hollerith, bridges around the area are blown up, and nearby arsenals are sabotaged. The townspeople, many of whom are veterans, battle the Soviets as the space station launches.

Hollerith's forces triumph and the Americans transmit an ultimatum to the Soviets and Chinese: The satellite is armed and will destroy Moscow and Peking in 24 hours if occupation forces do not withdraw from American soil and free all prisoners of war. Hollerith offers Justin important positions in the new government and society, but he refuses them and kneels in prayer with Sparhawk, fearing the fulfillment of mutual assured destruction.

== Reception ==
Galaxy reviewer Floyd C. Gale praised the novel as "believable throughout and thoroughly frightening." The Boston Herald gave a positive review, and the Chicago Tribune called it "The most shockingly realistic science fiction book since Orwell's '1984'...."

== See also ==
- 1955 in science fiction
- Face to Face with Communism
- Invasion, U.S.A. (1952 film)
- Invasion literature
