= Microcosmic God =

Short story by Theodore Sturgeon

- Short story by Theodore Sturgeon
- Country: United States
- Language: English
- Genre: Science fiction

Publication
- Published in: Astounding Science Fiction
- Publication type: Periodical
- Media type: Magazine
- Publication date: 1941

"Microcosmic God" is a science fiction novelette by American writer Theodore Sturgeon. Originally published in April 1941 in the magazine Astounding Science Fiction, it was recognized as one of the best science fiction short stories published before the Nebula Awards by the Science Fiction Writers of America in 1970, and was named as one of the best science fiction stories in polls by Analog Science Fiction and Fact (the renamed Astounding) in 1971 and Locus in 1999. In 1976, it was also published as a comic book version (drawn by Adolfo Buylla) in issue 3 of Starstream: Adventures in Science Fiction, a comic anthology in four issues by Gold Key Comics.

== Plot summary ==
A highly reclusive biochemist named Kidder produces inventions that transform human life, bringing improvements across several fields of science and engineering. Through all of this, he is never interested in any personal gain of money, besides what he needs to live on his island alone, and especially not fame. His bank takes a hold of all those aspects, specifically a man named Conant, who is the only one allowed to contact Kidder's island. Kidder is a brilliant scientist, but the best he can do as a human is to turn others' ideas into usable or improved products – he cannot innovate. Consequently, he gets impatient with the slow progress of human innovation and develops a synthetic life form which he calls "Neoterics", tiny intelligent beings whom he keeps captive in an isolated artificial environment. These creatures live at a greatly accelerated rate and therefore have a very short lifespan, producing many generations over a short period of time. Due to enforced competition among groups of Neoterics, they provide the innovations that Kidder seeks. Kidder asserts his authority over the Neoterics by killing off half the population of Neoterics, referencing it as an example of his power. Kidder communicates with the colony via "teletype," communications which the Neoterics come to consider divine.

Conant talks Kidder into a new project, and once he has the information he needs, he threatens Kidder and takes over the island. He tries to expand the size of the project, hoping to use a Neoteric design for a new source of power that will be used all around the world, making him incredibly rich. When the banker attempts to kill Kidder and the workers who had assisted in building the power plant, Kidder asks the Neoterics to throw up an impenetrable force field around his home. He failed to save all men but one, excitedly introducing Johansen to his greatest little invention.

The story ends years later. It is unknown whether or not Kidder is still alive under the shield, but it is certain that the Neoterics have continued to develop technology far beyond anything controlled by humans.

== Awards and criticism ==
"Microcosmic God" was among the stories selected in 1970 by the Science Fiction Writers of America as one of the best science fiction short stories published before the creation of the Nebula Awards. As such, it was published in The Science Fiction Hall of Fame Volume One, 1929-1964.

The novelette was also recognized as the 13th best all-time short science fiction story in a 1971 Analog Science Fact & Fiction poll (tied with Cyril M. Kornbluth's "The Little Black Bag"), and as the 42nd best all-time science fiction novelette in a 1999 Locus poll (tied with Edmond Hamilton's "What's It Like Out There?").

The Neoterics make an illustrative reappearance in the 2008 management book Groundswell, developed by employees at Forrester Research: Neoterics are said to "outpace any human research lab since they try, fail, and adapt so much more quickly than ordinary slow-paced humans", and are thus presented as "apt metaphor for the current state of the Internet", where Web 2.0 technologies and the many people involved generate similarly "rapid prototyping, failure, and adaptation."

== Cultural influence ==
Microcosmic God is an early example of the use of the "pocket universe" concept in science fiction. The concept of a microcosmic universe manipulated or created within a larger, parent universe developed by Sturgeon was later to be reconstructed in television on shows like The Twilight Zone, The Outer Limits, The Simpsons, Futurama, South Park, and Rick and Morty.

- "The Little People" (The Twilight Zone, 1962)
- "Wolf 359" (The Outer Limits, 1964)
- "The Genesis Tub"" (from "Treehouse of Horror VII", The Simpsons, 1996)
- "Godfellas" (Futurama, 2002)
- "Simpsons Already Did It" (South Park, 2002)
- "Daichi's First Hair" (Den-noh Coil, 2007)
- "The Ricks Must Be Crazy" (Rick and Morty, 2015)
