= The Marching Morons =

1951 science fiction story by Cyril Kornbluth

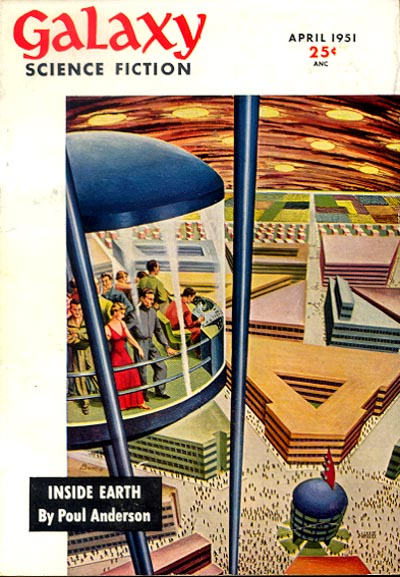
"The Marching Morons" was originally published in the April 1951 issue of Galaxy Science Fiction.

"The Marching Morons" is a science fiction story by American writer Cyril M. Kornbluth, originally published in Galaxy in April 1951. It was included in The Science Fiction Hall of Fame, Volume Two after being voted one of the best novellas up to 1965.

== Background ==
In the "Introduction" to The Best of C. M. Kornbluth, Frederik Pohl (Kornbluth's friend and collaborator) explains some of the inspiration to "The Marching Morons". The work was written after Pohl suggested that Kornbluth write a follow-up story that focuses on the future presented in the short story "The Little Black Bag". In contrast to the "little black bag" arriving in the past from the future, Kornbluth wanted to write about a man arriving in the future from the past. To explain sending a man to the future, Kornbluth borrowed from David Butler's 1930 science fiction film Just Imagine, in which a man is struck by lightning, trapped in suspended animation, and reanimated in the future. In "The Marching Morons", after the character John Barlow is told how he had been in a state of suspended animation, Barlow mutters, "Like that movie."

== Plot ==
In 1988, real estate agent and con artist John Barlow is placed in suspended animation after a freak accident. He is revived in the distant future, in a confusing world filled with hypersexualized advertisements, vapid entertainment, and people who exhibit erratic, nonsensical behavior. Shortly after being revived, Barlow is introduced to two men, Tinny-Peete and Ryan-Ngana, who inform him that the lamentable state of society is the fault of the "morons", the world's vast population of unintelligent people, who greatly outnumber the much smaller population of intelligent people.

Tinny-Peete and Ryan-Ngana explain to Barlow that the most urgent crisis of their time is the population problem ("Poprob"). Historically, people of higher intelligence often chose to have few children (or no children at all) for pragmatic reasons, while people of lower intelligence, compelled by their sex drives, had larger families and reproduced in greater numbers. By the far-future era in which Barlow has awakened, this unbalanced trend has been carried to its logical extreme, with a total world population of five billion morons (with an average IQ of 45) living under the supervision of three million members of an elite, intellectual upper-class who secretly govern world affairs. Both Tinny-Peete and Ryan-Ngana are members of this group.

The simple-minded morons cannot be left to govern themselves or else the world will descend into chaos and devastating war. As a result, the elite minority are effectively "enslaved" by the moron majority, working themselves to exhaustion while attempting to maintain global order and stability. Controlling the morons' population growth is impractical for several reasons, but unless some corrective action is taken, the inevitable outcome will be the depletion of Earth's dwindling natural resources, followed by the total collapse of human civilization. All attempts to solve Poprob have failed, and the elite hope that Barlow, as a man from a different time and with a different perspective on the problem, might be able to offer a novel solution.

Barlow has an idea, but he refuses to elaborate until Tinny-Peete and Ryan-Ngana agree to formally name him dictator of the entire world, promising him wealth, power, and fame. Taking inspiration from his knowledge of fraudulent real estate deals, propaganda techniques employed by Nazi Germany during the Holocaust, and the myth of lemmings drowning themselves in the sea, Barlow devises a plan for the extermination of the moron population. Barlow orchestrates a massive propaganda campaign encouraging the morons to migrate to the planet Venus, which is billed as a tropical paradise. The overcrowded and inefficient cities in which the morons reside are to be dismantled, their steel used to construct fleets of "spaceships" ostensibly intended to ferry people to Venus; in reality, the spaceships are not capable of making the trip – the best spaceship ever made had crashed on the moon – but they are capable of getting their passengers out of sight of the other morons, to some unspecified location where billions can be killed without damaging Earth's biosphere. To allay any suspicion, forged postcards are sent from Venusian "colonists" to their families, describing Venus as a lush tropical paradise and encouraging them to follow. The United States Congress, under the control of the elite, promotes the colonization of Venus as an extension of manifest destiny and guarantees Venusian settlers permanent land rights on the planet. This sparks widespread nationalistic fervor as the various nations of Earth all adopt similar approaches and race to reach Venus in order to stake their own claims. As more and more morons leave, the ensuing loneliness compels the rest to follow.

Barlow's plan is a complete success; Earth is gradually emptied of morons and Poprob is solved. While reviewing his ledger, Barlow comes across an entry for an unauthorized project called "Poprobterm". When he demands an explanation, his assistants lead him to a one-man rocket, force him aboard, and immediately launch the rocket into space; the sudden acceleration crushes Barlow against the floor, killing him. The elite, disgusted by Barlow's ruthlessness, cruelty, and egotistical demands, have disposed of him as part of the "final cleanup" of Poprob.

== See also ==
- The City Without Jews
- A Day Without a Mexican
- Fertility and intelligence
- Flynn effect
- Eugenics and Dysgenics
- The Gene Bomb
- Harrison Bergeron
- Idiocracy
- The Man Who Sold the Moon
- Search the Sky
- The Space Merchants

== Sources ==
- Pohl, Frederik (1976). "Introduction". The Best of C. M. Kornbluth. New York: Taplinger. ISBN 0-8008-0723-5.
