= Face to Face with Communism =

- Production company: Department of the Air Force
- Release date: 1951
- Running time: 26 minutes
- Country: United States

Face to Face with Communism (1951) is an American Cold War propaganda film. It dramatized the effects on a small town of an imagined invasion of the United States by the Soviet Union. Its running time was 26 minutes.

== See also ==
- Battle Beneath the Earth (1967)
- Invasion, U.S.A. (1952 film)
- Invasion literature
- Mosinee, Wis., mock Communist takeover (1950)
- Not This August (1955)
- Red Nightmare (1962)
- Rocket Attack U.S.A. (1958)
