= Gunner Cade =

1952 novel by Cyril Kornbluth and Judith Merril

- Dust-jacket from the first edition
- Author: Cyril Judd
- Cover artist: Paul Bacon
- Language: English
- Genre: Science fiction
- Publisher: Simon & Schuster
- Publication date: 1952
- Publication place: United States
- Media type: Print (hardback)
- Pages: 218 pp

Gunner Cade is a science fiction novel by American writers Cyril M. Kornbluth and Judith Merril (the second and last written together under their Cyril Judd pseudonym), originally serialized in Astounding Science Fiction in 1952. It was issued in hardcover by Simon & Schuster later that year, with an Ace Double paperback following in 1957. Gollancz issued a British hardcover in 1964, with a Penguin paperback following in 1966. The Science Fiction Book Club published an edition in 1965, with a Dell paperback appearing in 1969. Reprint editions (in various languages) continued to appear in the 1970s and 1980s. NESFA Press included the novel in a 2008 omnibus of Kornbluth and Merril novels, Spaced Out.

Gunner Cade began as a synopsis, "Time of Troubles", written entirely by Kornbluth. The co-authors broke the story down into planned 5000-word segments, which they wrote alternately. "Cyril would write what was supposed to be a five-thousand-word section in about three thousand words. I would then go back and rewrite his section to make it five thousand words", Merril remembered. "Then I would write the next five-thousand-word section in eight thousand words. He would rewrite my section to shorten it". They completed the novel in six weeks, writing quickly because both were "desperately broke".

The novel deals with the transformation of Cade, the title character, from a loyal member of the elite police force of an authoritarian interplanetary regime into an individualistic rebel. Kornbluth and Merril crafted the novel to appeal to Astounding SF editor John W. Campbell, using Fritz Leiber's Gather, Darkness! as their model. "We did a really interesting analytical breakdown of what Campbell would and wouldn't buy", Merril later wrote. "The scientific stuff had to be there, but the sort of spiritual fantasy element had to be there as well. Also, the novel had to contain the sort of humor that made sense to Campbell".

== Reception ==
Basil Davenport praised Gunner Cade in The New York Times, calling it "a first-rate melodrama of the neo-Graustarkian school which is one of the shapes of interplanetary fiction. For both action and literacy, this is a long way ahead of most". Michael Moorcock found the novel "a good, intelligently written adventure SF tale, which at times gives a very real impression of a possible future society. . . . Exciting, unpretentious stuff in the best tradition". Boucher and McComas, however, dismissed it as "a competent but not particularly palatable rehash of standard ideas".

Samuel R. Delany remembers that "Brutal and authority-fixated Cade's transformation, as he learns compassion, to understand human rights and a higher sense of ethics, was as powerful to me as a thirteen-year-old reader as anything I'd read. Robert Markley declared that Gunner Cade "updates the anti-totalitarianism of Yevgeny Zamiatin's We . . . Kornbluth and Merril's nightmarish capitalism treats humans, minerals, and foodstuffs as commodities that are used brutally, unthinkingly, without regard to consequences".

Ken Ramstead reviewed Gunner Cade and Takeoff in Ares Magazine #17 and commented that "After completing Takeoff, I had to wonder why it had not been given prime billing over Gunner Cade. Takeoff is certainly the superior work, a joy to read and well worth the slog through the murk of Gunner Cade to get to it."
