= Cyril Judd =

Cyril Judd was a joint pseudonym used by American writers Cyril M. Kornbluth and Judith Merril for their two novels:

- Gunner Cade (1952); serialized in Astounding Science Fiction in 1952.
- Outpost Mars (1952, reprinted as Sin in Space in 1961; serialised as Mars Child in Galaxy Science Fiction in 1951.)
