= Critical Mass (Pohl and Kornbluth short story) =

- Short story by Frederik Pohl and Cyril M. Kornbluth
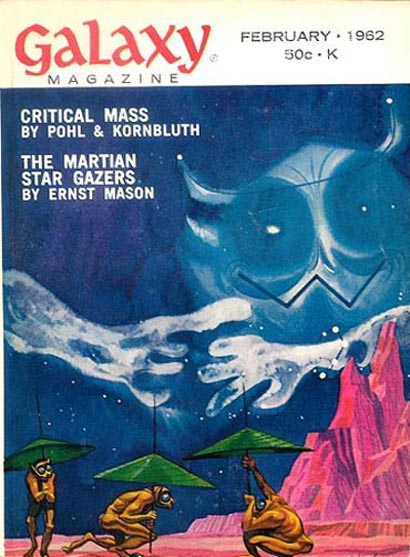
- Country: USA
- Language: English
- Genre: Science fiction short story

Publication
- Published in: Galaxy Science Fiction
- Publication type: Periodical
- Media type: Print (Magazine)
- Publication date: February 1962

"Critical Mass" is a science fiction novelette by American writers Frederik Pohl and Cyril M. Kornbluth. It was first published in Galaxy Science Fiction magazine in February 1962, almost four years after Kornbluth's death. According to a foreword by Pohl in a collection also called Critical Mass, the story was assembled from notes Kornbluth made for three story ideas, plus one of Pohl's own from 1954. After Kornbluth's death, his widow turned over his story notes and drafts to Pohl. Pohl completed a dozen or so stories based on this material, most of which were eventually collected in the volume "The Wonder Effect" which contained most of the same stories as the later "Critical Mass" collection.

Arthur C. Clarke also wrote a short story with this title. It is included in his collection Tales from the White Hart.

== Plot introduction ==
The story takes place in 1998. The Cold War has continued for about 50 years. America is in a state of constant readiness for nuclear attack. Shelter drills are an everyday occurrence. They are accompanied by military exercises which rehearse destroying attacking aircraft and missiles. Despite this, life goes on as it always has. People gripe about the drills, but would far rather talk about political issues or, better yet, baseball.

The lives of three people, a newly minted civil engineering graduate, a statistician and a magazine editor, intersect. This starts a chain reaction which leads to the overturning of the status quo.

An important character in the story is the President of the United States. A former New Jersey accountant, state senator and Governor, who nonetheless thinks of himself as a "hard riding, hard drinking Southern gentleman", he is a front for an army of advisers and fixers who tell him what to say through a wireless earphone. He leads the "Middle Roaders", apparently a Republican faction. The opposition are the "Nationalists" who favor a sudden first strike, or "sneak punch" against the Communists. The Democratic party is despised, being routinely referred to as the "Party of Treason".

The burning political issue in Congress and the nation is the "Civilian Shelters Bill", or "C.S.B.", a plan to build deep air-raid shelters capable of housing the entire nation. So disconnected is the President that he knows nothing about this. The other obsession, the Baseball All-Star Game, is something he knows all about, and is looking forward to watching. This is the man who, at the end of the story, has to pick up the pieces and move the nation forward.

== Explanation of the title ==
As is revealed in the story, society has attained a state where, like a critical mass of fissionable material, one random event will lead to a complete transformation. The metaphor is extended by the story explicitly likening one character to a neutron, another to a nucleus, and the President to a neutron moderator. The accidental collision of the characters initiates the chain reaction.

== Plot summary ==
Walter Chase, a fresh graduate of Civil Engineering from "Eastern University", is a man on the make. Having been skillfully steered into his education with the promise of a guaranteed job on the Shelter programs to come, he regards all the people he meets as potential stepping stones on his way up the ladder. Those who do not look like good prospects he efficiently discards, an example being his college girlfriend whose father is only a passed-over Federal bureaucrat. Leaving college behind, he heads towards his destiny, the first stop being the staff of Senator David Horton, of Indiana, a passionate and slightly unstable advocate of the Civilian Shelters Bill.

Arturo Denzer, whom we first encounter bracing himself to face the day with the aid of vitamins, aspirin, thyroid extract, caffeine, nicotine and amphetamine, is ironically the editor of Nature's Way Magazine, specializing in reviews of "natural" food products. Getting to work is a matter of negotiating robotic elevators and taxis, all of whom attempt to draw him into unwanted conversations about the All-Star Game and the Civilian Shelters Bill. The worst is the taxi, which being a "Black and White hack", addresses him as "Mac". Arriving at his office in Washington D.C., he finds that a crucial lab report is missing, so he and his assistant, Maggie Frome, have to personally travel to the labs to collect it. On the way, they stop the taxi bothering them by pretending to be lovers "making out" in the back seat. The taxis are programmed simply to wink and chuckle at this. In reality they are discussing the upcoming edition of the magazine.

At the Nature's Way labs Arturo Denzer and Maggie Frome encounter the scientist Valendora, who prepared the report they came to collect. Valendora is disgusted when his boss at the lab decides that certain harmful side-effects of the product, Aztec Cocawine, can be overlooked. At this point an air-raid drill throws everything into confusion. Denzer and Maggie have to spend time in the shelter where everyone around them wants to discuss, as loudly as possible, the upcoming All-Star Game or the C.S.B. Frustrated beyond measure, Maggie yells at those near her to shut up, uttering the rude "P-word" (politics), much to Denzer's dismay.

President Braden appears at the daily White House press briefing, where it becomes apparent that he simply parrots what he hears in his earphone. The assembled correspondents likewise pretend that he is talking "off the cuff". Asked about C.S.B. the President delivers a formulaic speech about moving it forward, even though he knows nothing about it. He then has a meeting with Senator Horton, who almost has a meltdown in the Oval Office, so frustrated is he with the lack of progress of the bill. After Horton leaves, Braden tries to find out about C.S.B., only to be told by Senator Jim Harkness, who chairs the committee Horton sits on, that the whole thing is just an issue that has to be kept on the boil for as long as possible, there being no other significant political issues to use as a platform for re-election. Harkness is contemptuous of Horton, regarding him as a makeweight on the committee and a loose cannon politically. He recommends that the President "put some money" in Horton's district before the next election.

Emerging from the air-raid shelter, Denzer and Maggie are arrested because they are not wearing mandatory dosimeters. Tossed into a holding cell with other miscreants and drunks, they encounter Valendora and Chase, who are similarly inconvenienced. Valendora has a statistics article he needs to get to a reputable journal. Chase has a thesis that requires Senator Horton's urgent attention. Denzer has his own deadline to worry about. Fortunately at their arraignment Maggie spots a friend, another journalist who is covering the court for her newspaper. They retrieve what they think is Denzer's envelope from a pile, hand her the material to take to Nature's Way with instructions to the magazine compositor to rush it into print. Then they settle down to wait their turn to make bail.

To their horror, when they emerge to get a copy of the magazine, instantly printed on the sidewalk by yet another robot, they find that the materials they sent were Chase's thesis and Valendora's journal article. Digested by the magazine's computer they announce to the world that, according to Valendora, the All-Star Game is the most likely time for a "sneak punch" attack by the Communists, and according to Chase, the planned Civilian Shelters will be ineffective even against chemical explosives, let alone nuclear bombs. Valendora offers another, less scientific, prediction.

"I estimate that within five minutes we will all be back in the calabazo" (i.e. jail).

The story continues "But he was wrong. It was actually less than three."

The final act takes place in the President's office during the All-Star Game, with Senator Horton explaining why the four of them, then sitting meekly on a couch nearby, have just saved the country. Publishing Valendora's article not only caused the armed forces to check their own data and go on alert, it caused the Communists to hold back because the element of surprise had been lost. The nation's obsession with the All-Star Game would have caused everyone to be "looking the other way" as the attack commenced. Horton notes that Nazi Germany used a similar tactic of scheduling attacks for holidays and long weekends. At the same time as Valendora's analysis deflected the attack, Chase's thesis effectively deflated C.S.B. This removed the issue platform that the President's party had intended to milk for all it was worth, aiming to re-elect him in 2000.

Here the President finds himself cast adrift. The voice in his ear is silent. His aides cannot help him. Looking at his clean desktop, where once Harry S. Truman had a sign saying "The buck stops here", he sees that even without a sign, this is the place where decisions have to be made, for better or worse. He tells Horton about his days at West Point, when he wrote what, to him, was a revelatory history paper about societal obsessions, such as monarchy and slavery, that got bigger and more all-consuming until they collapsed. His hopes for distinction were dashed when his tutor pointed out that Arnold J. Toynbee had already covered the same ground. Still, he realizes that he has been witness to just such a collapse. Summoning what leadership he can muster, he decides that he and only he can take the next step. He explains this to Horton.

Back on the street, Chase, Valendora and Denzer face their own futures. Chase may be able to salvage his former college relationship. Valendora has to get to his journal's office to update his article. And Denzer begins to realize that Maggie Frome may be more than just an assistant to him. He flags down a taxi and they climb into the back seat. The taxi chuckles and winks on cue, but this time the couple are not pretending.
