= Science Fiction Adventures (British magazine) =

British digest-size science fiction magazine (1958–63)

Science Fiction Adventures was a British digest-size science fiction magazine, published from 1958 to 1963 by Nova Publications as a companion to New Worlds and Science Fantasy. It was edited by John Carnell. Science Fiction Adventures began as a reprint of the American magazine of the same name, Science Fiction Adventures, but after only three issues the American version ceased publication. Instead of closing down the British version, which had growing circulation, Nova decided to continue publishing it with new material. The fifth issue was the last which contained stories reprinted from the American magazine, though Carnell did occasionally reprint stories thereafter from other sources.

== Publication history and contents ==
	Jan	Feb	Mar	Apr	May	Jun	Jul	Aug	Sep	Oct	Nov	Dec
1958			1		2		3		4		5	
1959	6		7		8		9			10	11	12
1960		13			14		15		16		17	
1961	18		19		20		21		22		23	
1962	24		25		26		27		28		29	
1963	30		31		32							
Issues of Science Fiction Adventures, showing issue numbers. The editor was John Carnell throughout.

In 1956, John Carnell, the editor of the British science fiction (sf) magazines New Worlds and Science Fantasy, attended the World Science Fiction Convention in New York, where he met Larry Shaw and Irwin Stein. Shaw was the editor of an American sf magazine, Science Fiction Adventures, which Stein's company, Royal Publications, was planning to launch at the end of the year. Carnell and Stein agreed on a British reprint edition, to be a sister magazine to the two Carnell was already editing. In the event it took over a year to work out the details, and it was not until March 1958 that the first issue appeared.

Carnell's plan was to use longer stories in the British SF Adventures, and the first issue included three novelettes from the June and September 1957 American magazine: Cyril Kornbluth's "The Slave", Robert Silverberg's "Chalice of Death" (under his "Calvin M. Knox" pseudonym), and Algis Budrys's "Yesterday's Man". In the summer of 1958 Stein shut down the American magazine, but since sales of the new British version were strong, Carnell decided to keep it going, with a combination of reprinted stories from other sources, and new stories acquired specifically for SF Adventures. The first issue consisting of entirely new stories was dated January 1959.

Notable fiction included J. G. Ballard's The Drowned World, Michael Moorcock's The Blood Red Game, and John Brunner's Times Without Number, published as series of short stories. The magazine was cancelled because of declining sales after 32 issues, with the final issue dated May 1963. Carnell hoped this would be a temporary hiatus, but the following year Nova went out of business, and Science Fiction Adventures was never revived.

== Bibliographic details ==
The editor for all thirty-two issues was John Carnell, and the publisher was Nova Publications of London. There were five volumes of six numbers and a final volume of two numbers, but the numbering ran consecutively, so that volume 1 number 6 was following by volume 2 number 7. It was bimonthly, except for a short period at the end of 1959, when the September issue was skipped and then three consecutive monthly issues appeared from October to December. All issues were 112 pages except for 21, which was 116 pages; it was priced at 2/- until issue 18, and 2/6 for the remaining 14 issues.
