= David E. Comings =

American medical geneticist

David Comings
- Born: March 8, 1935 (age 91); Beacon, New York
- Education: University of Illinois; Feinberg School of Medicine
- Spouse: Sally (m. 2008)
- Scientific career
- Workplaces: City of Hope National Medical Center

David E. Comings (born March 8, 1935) is an American medical geneticist and former chief of genetics at the City of Hope National Medical Center in Duarte, California, a position he held from 1966 until his 2002 retirement. He has served as the president of the American Society of Human Genetics (1988) and the editor-in-chief of The American Journal of Human Genetics (1979–86). He has been a fellow of the American Society for Clinical Investigation since 1968. He is known for his research on the genetics of Tourette's syndrome, which he began studying in 1980 with his wife, Brenda Comings. He has also studied the role of genetics in nicotine addiction and alcoholism. Although Dr. Comings retired in 2002 (and closed his laboratory at the end of 2003), he remained active in the field through 2016. He currently directs 'The Comings Foundation': a private foundation (www.TheComingsFoundation.org) devoted to combatting climate change and advancing the Medical Sciences.

== Books ==
- Tourette Syndrome and Human Behavior (Hope Press, 1990)
- Search for the Tourette Syndrome and Human Behavior Genes (Hope Press, 1996)
- The Gene Bomb (Hope Press, 1996)
- Did Man Create God?: is Your Spiritual Brain at Peace with Your Thinking Brain? (Hope Press, 2008)
