= Outpost Mars =

1951 novel by Cyril Kornbluth

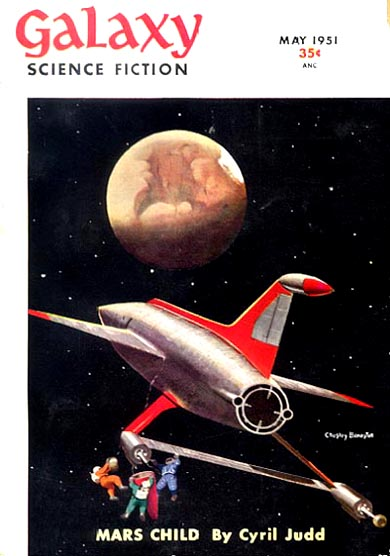
Cover of the Galaxy Science Fiction magazine, May 1951 issue, featuring Mars Child.

Outpost Mars is a short science fiction novel by American writers Cyril M. Kornbluth and Judith Merril, published under their pseudonym Cyril Judd. It was originally a three-part serial in Galaxy Science Fiction in 1951 under the title "Mars Child" and was first published under the title Outpost Mars in 1952 by Abelard Press, New York. It was reprinted as Sin in Space in 1961.

== Plot summary ==
The story is based on the growth of a fictional Mars settlement. After 40 years of settlement, Mars has developed into a thriving mining and farming colony, trading four times a year with Earth via rocket. The people of Sun Lake are trying to establish themselves as a self-sufficient community, contrasted with nearby industrial establishments like the Brenner Pharmaceuticals Corporation. Now a legal crisis with Brenner Pharmaceuticals threatens to destroy all the colony's hard work. A small fortune's worth of a drug deadlier than heroin, called Marcaine, has been stolen from a factory near the colony, and Hugo Brenner, the notorious drug dealer and manufacturer, has come to the colony to accuse the council of harboring a drug thief and smuggler. The clock ticks with less than a week until the next rocket shipment goes out; the council goes into a mad search to find a culprit or the missing drugs as they face being shut down and starved out. The book follows the daily routine of the colony's doctor, Tony Hellman: handling several medical problems throughout the colony, delivering a baby, administering checkups, as well as tending to regular patients. By looking into the suspicious murder of a nearby pregnant woman and health complications with the newborn, Sunny, Tony continues to unravel the mystery of the stolen Marcaine. Even after the packing areas and labs are scoured, the drugs are still missing.

Eight new passengers fly over from Marsport to the colony, one of them being a famous writer Douglas Graham. Small child-sized footprints turn up in the desert and the story grabs Graham's interest. Graham, Hellman and his assistant Anna make a series of spectacular discoveries that lead to the unearthing of a secret mutant dwarf species of Mars that has been eating the stolen Marcaine as its natural food source.
