= The Syndic =

1953 novel by Cyril Kornbluth

- First edition
- Author: Cyril M. Kornbluth
- Cover artist: Paul Galdone
- Language: English
- Genre: Science fiction
- Publisher: Doubleday
- Publication date: October 1953
- Publication place: United States
- Media type: Print (hardback & paperback)
- Pages: 223
- OCLC: 1077490

The Syndic is a 1953 science fiction novel by Cyril M. Kornbluth.

== Plot summary ==
The prologue introduces the setting, a future North America divided between rival criminal gangs, the Syndic on the East Coast and the Mob in Chicago, who have driven the federal government into exile in Iceland, Ireland and other North Atlantic islands. Life has more or less returned to normal in Syndic territory – as long as protection money is paid on time. The rest of the world has collapsed into either peasant life or tribalism.

Attitudes to sex are generally tolerant, with free sex outside of marriage and both polygamy and polyandry accepted. (However, male homosexuality is not, and lesbianism is never mentioned.)

The protagonist, Charles Orsino, is a low-ranking member of the Syndic who collects protection money in New York. After a failed assassination attempt, he is invited to a meeting of the leaders of the Syndic, who suspect that the exiled government were responsible. To discover the truth, Charles volunteers to go undercover to infiltrate the government, with a false personality created by hypnosis to fool lie detectors. He is taken to the main naval base on the shores of Ireland. He also visits Ireland outside of government territory: it is tribal and governed by sorceresses who have genuine powers of telepathy. It is mentioned in passing that England is also tribal and much weaker.

While escaping home, he also visits Mob territory and finds it much more disorganized. He proposes that the Syndic become more like a regular government to protect itself. But his mentor rejects this, and the book ends on that note.

== Reception and influences ==
The Encyclopedia of Science Fiction noted that the novel had wrongly been seen as "deficient" in comparison with Kornbluth's collaborative work, concluding that aspects of the Syndic government structure were "effective and even prophetic."

The novel's exploration of agorism or anarcho-capitalism proved popular with libertarians. The novel also explored the underexplored topic of a mafia state, or mafianism, in a positive light. The novel had an influence on the libertarian Samuel Edward Konkin III, who considered it an under-appreciated classic. It was also inducted into the Prometheus Award Hall of Fame in 1986.
