= Science Fiction Adventures (1956 magazine) =

American digest-size science fiction magazine (1956–58)

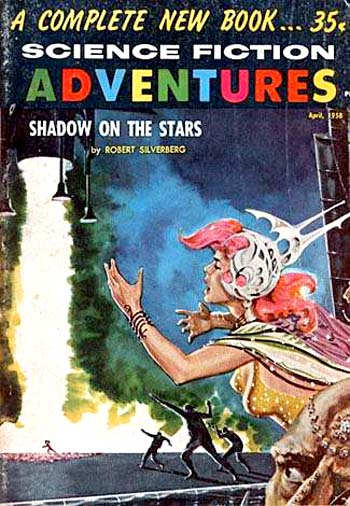
- Cover of the April 1958 issue, by Ed Emshwiller
- Editor: Larry Shaw
- Publisher: Royal Publications
- First issue: December 1956

Science Fiction Adventures was an American digest-size science fiction magazine, published from 1956 to 1958 by Irwin Stein's Royal Publications as a companion to Infinity Science Fiction, which had been launched in 1955. Larry Shaw was the editor for all 12 issues. Science Fiction Adventures focused on longer fiction than appeared in Infinity; these were often labeled as novels, though they were rarely longer than 20,000 words. Shaw declared in his first editorial that he wanted to bring back a "sense of wonder", and he printed straightforward action-adventure stories. Two other magazines of the period, Imagination and Imaginative Tales, had similar editorial approaches, but science fiction historian Mike Ashley considers that Science Fiction Adventures contained the best fiction of the three. Robert Silverberg was a prolific contributor, under his own name and under the pseudonym "Calvin M. Knox", and he also collaborated with Randall Garrett on two stories in the first issue, under two different pseudonyms. Other well-known writers occasionally appeared, including Harlan Ellison, Cyril M. Kornbluth, Algis Budrys, and Harry Harrison. Ed Emshwiller contributed cover art for nine of the twelve issues, and one of the other three was among John Schoenherr's earliest sales.

The magazine was canceled because of disappointing sales; the final issue was dated June 1958, and Infinity only lasted a few months longer. A British reprint edition commenced in early 1958, edited by John Carnell; after the American original ceased publication, Carnell kept the magazine going for 32 issues by using reprints from other sources and by printing original material.

== Publication history ==
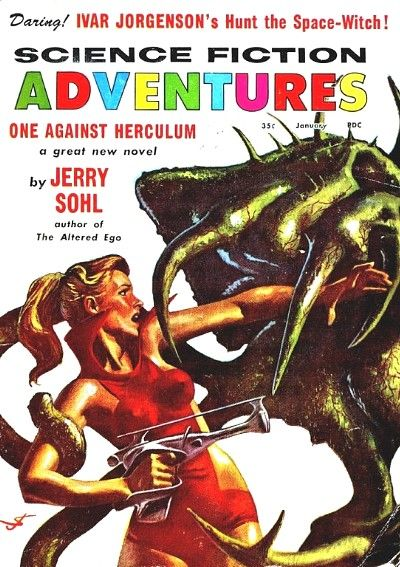
Cover of the January 1958 issue, by John Schoenherr

In 1955, Irwin Stein, the owner of Royal Publications, launched two magazines: Infinity Science Fiction and Suspect Detective Stories. Both were edited by Larry Shaw, and the first issue of each was dated November 1955. Shaw was knowledgeable about science fiction (sf), and put more of his efforts into Infinity, which established itself sufficiently for Stein to continue publication for several years. Suspect, which published action-adventure crime fiction, was less successful. Sf historian Mike Ashley describes it as having "no personality or individuality", and crime fiction historian Michael Cook finds it "adequate but not outstanding ... these were not poor stories. Just more of the same". Suspect's schedule was intended to be bimonthly, but this began to slip with the third issue, and after five issues Stein decided to scrap Suspect and start another science fiction title instead. To avoid applying for another second-class mailing permit, which would delay the launch of the new magazine, he simply retitled Suspect to Science Fiction Adventures and continued the volume numbering scheme, so that the first issue was volume 1, number 6. This led some readers to believe that the magazine was a revival of the Science Fiction Adventures edited by Lester del Rey and Harry Harrison for nine issues between 1952 and 1954, but there was no connection. The US Post Office decided that this was a new magazine, and not just a title change, and forced Stein to obtain a new mailing permit for Science Fiction Adventures, so Stein abandoned the pretence that it was the same magazine as Suspect Detective Stories, and the second issue became volume 1, number 2.

SF Adventures and Infinity both began on a bimonthly schedule, which meant that they stayed on newsstands for two months at a time, helping sales. Stein was unwilling to give up this benefit completely so, in 1957, when he decided to increase the magazines' frequency, he put them both on a six-week schedule, but kept the cover date showing a single month. (Note: The change in schedule began with the June 1957 issue. The April 1957 issue had gone on sale in early February; the June issue went on sale on March 28.) This led to some reader complaints: one wrote in to Infinity to say "My confusion is hopeless! Go monthly!" In 1958 Stein returned both magazines to a bimonthly schedule.

At the World Science Fiction Convention in 1956, when Stein announced the launch of SF Adventures, John Carnell, the British editor of New Worlds, approached Stein to ask if he could set up a British reprint edition of Stein's magazine. Stein agreed, but it took a year to make the arrangements, so the first issue of the British Science Fiction Adventures appeared in early 1958. Towards the end of the US Science Fiction Adventure's run, Stein took two of the long stories that had been bought for SF Adventures and published them in Infinity instead, hoping to boost its sales, but Stein gave up on both magazines by the end of 1958. He had decided instead to launch two magazines, Monster Parade and Monsters and Things, to take advantage of the new interest in horror and science fiction movies. Carnell continued publication of the British version, using reprints from other titles as well as new stories, and eventually produced 32 issues.

== Contents ==
In Shaw's editorial in the first issue, he lamented that science fiction was losing a sense of wonder, and "[was not] as much fun to read as it used to be". He claimed that by focusing on adventure fiction "carried by a good story", Science Fiction Adventures would "be an antidote for that situation". Ashley considers that Shaw intended to attract younger readers than Infinity was aimed at. Shaw's policy of printing longer stories was highlighted on the first issue's cover by a banner proclaiming "3 Complete New Action Novels", though this was misleading as the stories rarely exceeded 20,000 words. The first issue's lead story, "Starcombers", by Edmond Hamilton, was only 15,000 words, and the other two stories, both pseudonymous collaborations by Robert Silverberg and Randall Garrett, were shorter still. Ashley describes Shaw's editorial policy as "no different to that of Imagination or Imaginative Tales", two sf magazines of the day that focused on action stories, but adds that "SF Adventures contained stronger material". Ashley considers Silverberg's contributions to be among the best work of his early career; it included the "Chalice of Death" series, three stories written as by Calvin M. Knox that appeared in book form as Lest We Forget Thee, Earth in 1958. Silverberg was by far the most prolific contributor, providing over a quarter of the magazine's contents, often in collaboration with Garrett. Six of Silverberg's early novels first saw print in SF Adventures. Harlan Ellison appeared regularly, and Shaw also obtained stories from Algis Budrys, Cyril Kornbluth, Harry Harrison, and John Brunner. Most of the cover art was supplied by Ed Emshwiller; of the three covers he did not paint, one was an early effort by John Schoenherr.

== Bibliographical details ==
Issues of Science Fiction Adventures showing volume/issue number
Year	Jan	Feb	Mar	Apr	May	Jun	Jul	Aug	Sep	Oct	Nov	Dec
1956												1/6
1957		1/2		1/3		1/4		1/5	1/6	2/1		2/2
1958	2/3		2/4	2/5		2/6						
Larry Shaw was editor throughout.

The editor for all twelve issues was Larry Shaw, and the publisher was Royal Publications of New York. There were two volumes, each of six numbers; the first issue, dated December 1956, was numbered volume 1 number 6 because of Stein's attempt to make the magazine a continuation of Suspect Detective Stories, but thereafter the numbering was completely regular. The last issue was dated June 1958. Each issue was 128 pages and was priced at 35 cents.

== Sources ==
- Ashley, Mike (1985a). "Science Fiction Adventures (1956–1958)". In Tymn, Marshall B.; Ashley, Mike (eds.). Science Fiction, Fantasy, and Weird Fiction Magazines. Westport, Connecticut: Greenwood Press. pp. 524–526. ISBN 0-313-21221-X.
- Ashley, Mike (1985b). "Science Fiction Adventures (1958–1963)". In Tymn, Marshall B.; Ashley, Mike (eds.). Science Fiction, Fantasy, and Weird Fiction Magazines. Westport, Connecticut: Greenwood Press. pp. 526–529. ISBN 0-313-21221-X.
- Ashley, Mike (2005). Transformations: The Story of the Science Fiction Magazines from 1950 to 1970. Liverpool: Liverpool University Press. ISBN 0-85323-779-4.
- Cook, Michael L. (1983). "Suspect Detective Stories". In Cook, Michael L. (ed.). Mystery, Detective, and Espionage Magazines. Westport, Connecticut: Greenwood Press. pp. 548–550. ISBN 0-313-23310-1.
- Marchesani, Joseph (1985). "Infinity Science Fiction". In Tymn, Marshall B.; Ashley, Mike (eds.). Science Fiction, Fantasy and Weird Fiction Magazines. Westport, Connecticut: Greenwood Press. pp. 352–355. ISBN 0-313-21221-X.
- Shaw, Larry (November 1955). "The Editor's Space". Science Fiction Adventures. 1: 50.
- Tuck, Donald H. (1982). The Encyclopedia of Science Fiction and Fantasy: Volume 3. Chicago: Advent: Publishers. ISBN 0-911682-26-0.
- Weinberg, Robert (1988a). "Emshwiller, Edmund Alexander". In Weinberg, Robert (ed.). A Biographical Dictionary of Science Fiction and Fantasy Artists. Westport, Connecticut: Greenwood Press. pp. 101–105. ISBN 0-313-24349-2.
- Weinberg, Robert (1988b). "Schoenherr, John". In Weinberg, Robert (ed.). A Biographical Dictionary of Science Fiction and Fantasy Artists. Westport, Connecticut: Greenwood Press. pp. 239–241. ISBN 0-313-24349-2.
