= The Explorers (collection) =

- Cover of the first edition
- Author: C. M. Kornbluth
- Illustrator: Jack Faragasso
- Language: English
- Genre: Science fiction
- Publisher: Ballantine Books
- Publication date: 1954
- Publication place: United States
- Media type: Print (paperback)
- Pages: 145
- OCLC: 1870118

The Explorers is a collection of science fiction stories by American writer C. M. Kornbluth, originally published in paperback by Ballantine Books in 1954. Ballantine reissued the collection, which was Kornbluth's first, in 1963. While no further editions of the collection were published, six of its nine stories were included in Ballantine's 1977 The Best of C. M. Kornbluth, and all the stories are contained in NESFA's 1997 His Share of Glory: The Complete Short Science Fiction of C. M. Kornbluth.

== Contents ==
- "Foreword" (Frederik Pohl)
- "Gomez" (original)
- "The Mindworm" (Worlds Beyond 1950)
- "The Rocket of 1955" (Stirring Science Stories 1941)
- "The Altar at Midnight" (Galaxy 1952)
- "Thirteen O’Clock" (Stirring Science Stories 1941)
- "The Goodly Creatures" (F&SF 1952)
- "Friend to Man" (Ten Story Fantasy 1951)
- "With These Hands" (Galaxy 1951)
- "That Share of Glory" (Astounding 1952)
- "The Explorers" (afterword, Kornbluth)

"Thirteen O'Clock" was originally published under the Cecil Corwin byline. "The Rocket of 1955" first appeared in 1939 in Escape, an amateur magazine published by one of Kornbluth's friends.

== Reception ==
Writing in The New York Times Book Review. J. Francis McComas said "I know of no better introduction to [Kornbluth's] remarkable work than this collection of his more recent short stories". He praised Kornbluth's "gift with language" and "his future worlds postulated with an ironic appreciation of human frailty [and] his deadpan extension of ridiculous present-day institutions to their ultimate idiocy".

Anthony Boucher declared that "Kornbluth's sharp observation is everywhere present, and in most of the stories his bitter insight into the hearts and souls of future men (and by implication, into our own)". Damon Knight noted that all the stories were "written with distinction" and that even though several stories "explore a dangerous dead end in science fiction", each "represents the triumph of a master technician over an inappropriate form". Groff Conklin concluded that "Kornbluth's first short story collection is a distinguished one throughout". P. Schuyler Miller recommended the collection, singling out "With These Hands" for "projecting the plight of the creative artist in a wholly mechanized world".
