= The Mindworm =

- Short story by Cyril M. Kornbluth
- Country: USA
- Language: English
- Genre: Science fiction

Publication
- Published in: Worlds Beyond
- Publication type: Periodical
- Publisher: Hillman Periodicals
- Media type: Print (Magazine)
- Publication date: December 1950

"The Mindworm" is a science fiction short story written by American writer Cyril M. Kornbluth, first published in 1950. It combines the themes of mutant power, telepathy and ancient superstition.

== Plot summary ==
The protagonist, the Mindworm of the title, is an orphan, the result of a liaison between a U.S. Navy lieutenant and a nurse aboard ship during viewing of early atomic tests. He is a mutant, as a result of the atomic fallout after the testing, and he can "hear" the thoughts of others around him.

Cast out into the world as a young adult, he is about to be gang raped by hoboes when he discovers an ability to feed off strong emotions, killing one of his assailants in the process. He uses this to eliminate the rest of his attackers. He moves from town to town, eavesdropping on the thoughts of people around him, and using his abilities to induce the intense emotion he craves, and to gain material wealth. The thoughts he hears often represent a brutal side of America, as he hears the large and small cruelties people inflict on each other, ranging from family quarrels to beatings carried out in dark alleyways.

He can hear thoughts in other languages, though he cannot understand them. As he moves into communities where new Eastern European immigrants have congregated, he starts hearing the term "wompyear". Just as he realizes that this is their pronunciation of the word "vampire" and they have recognized him, his neighbors burst in and kill him.
