= Lest We Forget Thee, Earth =

Science fiction novel by Robert Silverberg

First edition (publ. Ace Books) Cover art by Ed Valigursky

Lest We Forget Thee, Earth is a fix-up novel derived from three short stories written by Robert Silverberg under the pen-name Calvin M. Knox and released in 1958. They are, in order; "Chalice of Death", "Earth Shall Live Again!" and "Vengeance of the Space Armada". This novel extends the three stories previously published in 1957 and 1958 in the magazine Science Fiction Adventures.

The story revolves around Hallam Navarre, a young Earthman serving as an advisor to the Galactic Overlord, Joroiran II. Running late to audience day, he discovers his position has been temporarily taken over by his rival Kausirn, and that Joroiran is none too happy about his tardiness. Hastily creating the excuse that he was searching for the mythical "Chalice of Death", he thinks he is out of trouble, only to discover that now Joroiran expects him to set off with fellow Earthman Domrik Carso in a quest to find it. The Earthmen change their quest and decide to search for the even more mythical Earth instead. Eventually they meet another Earthwoman, Helna Winstin and together they set off to discover the truth about their ancestral home planet, and the legendary "Chalice of Death".
