= Medical bag =

Bag for medical supplies

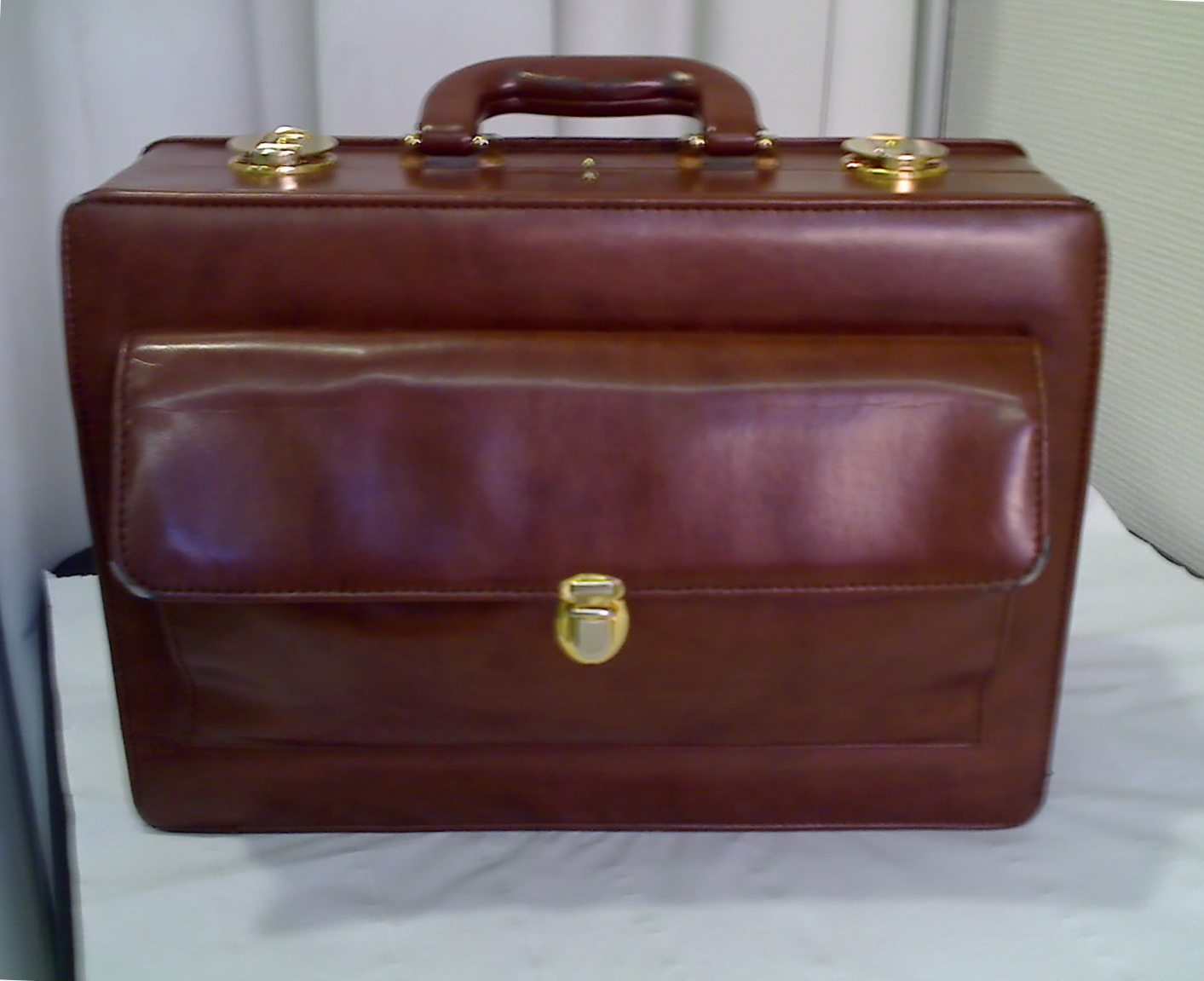
Doctor's bag

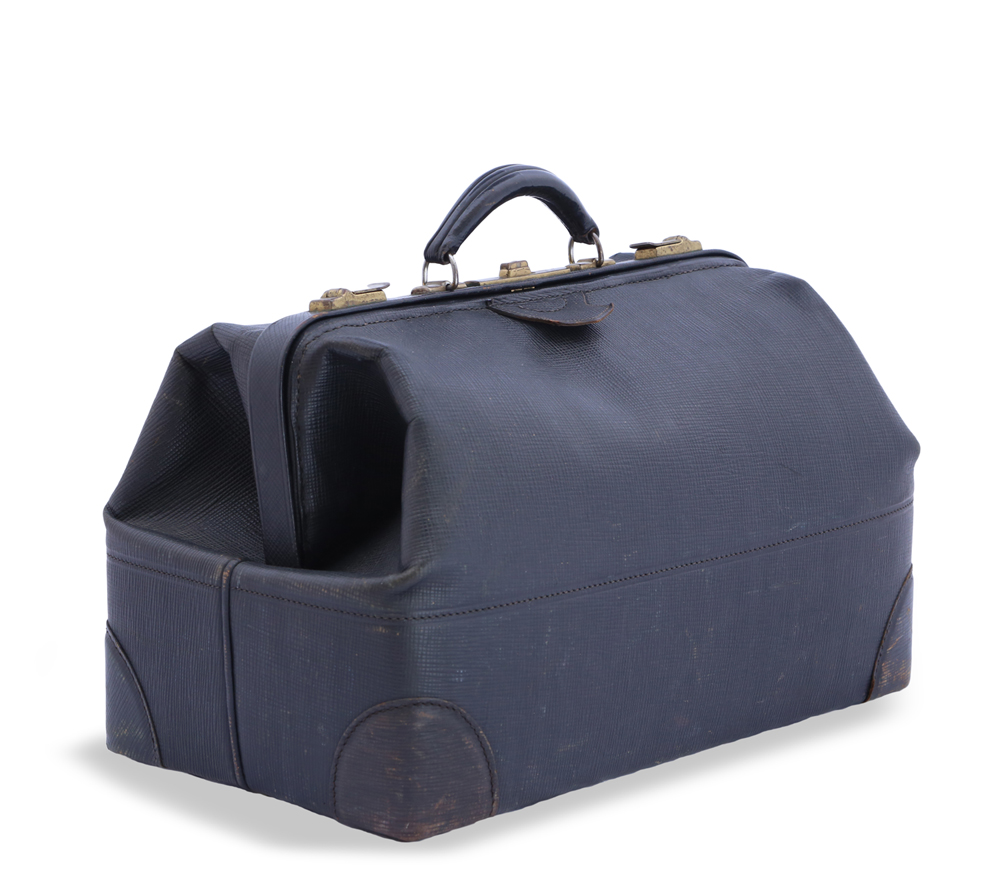
Traditional design

A medical bag (also called a doctor's bag or physician's bag) is a portable bag used by a physician or other medical professional to transport medical supplies and medicine.

Traditionally, the medical bag was made of leather, opened on the top with a split-handle design. During the American Civil War, physician's medical saddle bags were used. Modern medical bags are made of various materials and come in various designs that can include many pockets, pouches, and zippered or hook-and-loop openings.

Indigenous North American medicine men and shamans use a medicine bag. A battle bag is used in the military.

== See also ==
- First aid kit
- Gladstone bag
- The Little Black Bag
