= Zalman Kornblit =

Zalman Kornblit was a Jewish playwright, active in Yiddish theater in Romania in the early 20th century. His works included Eternal Diaspora (1906) and translations of Karl Gutzkow's Uriel Acosta and Friedrich Schiller's Thieves.
