= Invasion, U.S.A. (1952 film) =

1952 drama film

- Theatrical release poster
- Directed by: Alfred E. Green
- Written by: Robert Smith; Franz Schulz
- Based on: Story by Robert Smith; Franz Spencer
- Produced by: Albert Zugsmith; Robert Smith
- Starring: Gerald Mohr; Peggie Castle; Dan O'Herlihy
- Cinematography: John L. Russell
- Edited by: W. Donn Hayes
- Music by: Albert Glasser
- Production company: American Pictures Corp.
- Distributed by: Columbia Pictures
- Release date: December 10, 1952
- Running time: 74 minutes
- Country: United States
- Language: English
- Budget: $187,000
- Box office: $1.2 million

Invasion, U.S.A. (sometimes stylized Invasion USA) is a 1952 American drama film directed by Alfred E. Green and starring Gerald Mohr, Peggie Castle and Dan O'Herlihy. The screenplay is based on a story by Robert Smith and Franz Spencer about the invasion of the United States by an unnamed communist enemy, presumably the Soviet Union.

== Plot ==
In a New York bar, the brooding, mysterious forecaster Mr. Ohman is seated alone, drinking brandy. He engages in discussions with a cross-section of affluent Americans at the bar, including television newscaster Vince Potter, beautiful society woman Carla Sanford, a California industrialist, an Arizona rancher and a congressman. International news is bad, but the Americans do not want to hear it. They all enjoy their material wealth, dislike communism, want lower taxes and reject the need for industrial support of government. Ohman tells them that many Americans want safety and security but do not want to make any sacrifices to ensure it.

Suddenly, the news becomes worse. Communists are staging air attacks over Seal Point, Alaska and then Nome. Paratroops have landed on Alaskan airfields. Soon, the enemy's plan of attack becomes clear: civilian airfields are captured as staging areas while military airfields are A-bombed. American forces attack the enemy's homeland with Convair B-36 sorties, but the enemy moves steadily into Washington and Oregon. Shipyards in Puget Sound are hit with atomic attacks, causing massive casualties.

The Americans at the bar scramble to defend against the enemy attacks. Potter and Sanford become romantically interested in each other. Potter continues to broadcast while Sanford volunteers at a blood drive. The industrialist and the rancher return to their homes and find themselves on the front lines. The industrialist is caught in the battle for San Francisco and is shot in his office. The rancher is near Boulder Dam when it is destroyed by a nuclear missile, causing a tidal wave that floods much of the country downriver and overcomes the rancher and his family as they attempt to flee from it. The president delivers ineffectual broadcasts with inflated claims of counterattacks in order to rally the morale of the people. The enemy continues to advance with stealth attacks by troops dressed in American uniforms, including a paratrooper attack on the U.S. Capitol that kills the congressman. New York is hit with an atomic bomb and Potter is killed at Sanford's apartment by enemy soldiers. Threatened with rape, Sanford jumps to her death from the building.

Back at the bar, all five characters emerge from a hypnotic state that Ohman has induced. After being reassured that the tragic events were all an illusion, they hurry away to help boost the country's military preparedness, and Potter and Sanford resume the romance that had begun as part of the illusion.

== Cast ==
- Gerald Mohr as Vince Potter
- Peggie Castle as Carla Sanford
- Dan O'Herlihy as Mr. Ohman
- Robert Bice as George Sylvester
- Tom Kennedy as Tim the Bartender
- Wade Crosby as Congressman Arthur V. Harroway
- Erik Blythe as Ed Mulfory
- Phyllis Coates as Mrs. Mulfory
- Aram Katcher as Factory Window Washer
- Knox Manning as Himself
- Edward G. Robinson Jr. as Radio Dispatcher
- Noel Neill as Airline Ticket Agent
- Clarence A. Shoop as Army Major
- Joseph Granby as President of the United States (uncredited)
- William Schallert as Newscaster (uncredited)
- John Crawford as Man in Bar (uncredited)

== Production ==
Invasion, U.S.A. was the second film produced by American Pictures Corporation. The company planned to produce six films per year for five years, using a total budget of $3.5 million. The budget for Invasion, U.S.A. was $127,000, with $60,000 deferred. The producers had the cooperation of American civil-defense authorities.

Harold Daniels was to direct, but he was instead assigned to American Pictures Corporation's Port Sinister and was replaced by Alfred E. Green. Of the original actors who had been cast, Ron Randell withdrew, Clete Roberts was replaced by William Schallert and Michael O'Shea was replaced by Gerald Mohr. Filming began on March 26, 1952 at Motion Picture Center Studios.

The film is largely composed of stock footage from the World War II era.

== Reception ==
In a contemporary review for The New York Times, critic Oscar Godbout wrote:

It is a "message" picture. All the actors in it, especially the leads, Gerald Mohr, Peggie Castle, Dan O'Herlihy and Robert Bice. are dismal in their roles. They build their edifice of horror on the foundation that the United States must be strong and prepared and, if we're not, an utter ravaging is our fate. Complacency must be abolished and a warrior's posture assumed. With this premise established, the picture blithely ignores the possibility that peace might be obtained by free strength backing up reason and negotiation, and embarks on a pictorial essay in carnage, devastation, death and spiritual crucifixion. The whole bloody stew of cold brutality is resolved when the protagonists wake up to find they have been hypnotized in a bar by a TV magician. They leave the saloon en masse to donate blood and turn tractor factories into tank plants. This frank espousal of raw strength without thought sets it apart from the American heritage of quick thinking and dry powder, in that order.

Critic Edwin Schallert (his son played a newscaster in the film) of the Los Angeles Times wrote:

"Invasion U.S.A." may best be classified as a missed opportunity. It is what the movie trade might call an exploitation picture, dealing imaginatively with what could possibly happen if an enemy launched an atomic attack upon the United States. The picture is one that should have been made on the grand scale, and would then have been highly effective. Instead it is in the hodge-podge quickie class, with seemingly an overload of stock film shots, and inadequate special effects. The idea embodied in the screenplay will, however, probably come through to audiences that are not too discriminating. Perhaps that is all the sponsors of the feature anticipated.

== Legacy ==
Invasion, U.S.A. was shown on television in the late 1960s. In 1994, it was spoofed in Episode 602 of the television show Mystery Science Theater 3000 along with the 1950 education short A Date with Your Family.

== Home media ==
Invasion, U.S.A. was released in VHS format in 1998, and then on DVD in 2002. A special edition in 2009 featured two original civil-defense audio recordings on the alternate DVD audio track: The Complacent Americans and If the Bomb Falls: A Recorded Guide to Survival. This edition also featured the theatrical trailer for the 1956 reissue as well as interviews with stars Dan O'Herlihy, William Schallert and Noel Neill. The original and controversial short film Red Nightmare, narrated by Jack Webb, was also included in the bonus features.

== See also ==
- Face to Face with Communism
- Invasion U.S.A. (1985 film)
- Is This Tomorrow, a 1947 comic book with a similar plot
- Rocket Attack U.S.A.
- Invasion literature
