= Gladiator-At-Law =

1955 novel by Cyril M. Kornbluth

- First edition
- Author: Frederik Pohl and Cyril M. Kornbluth
- Language: English
- Genre: Science fiction
- Publisher: Ballantine Books
- Publication date: June 1955
- Publication place: United States
- Media type: Print (Paperback)
- Pages: 171
- OCLC: 13532842

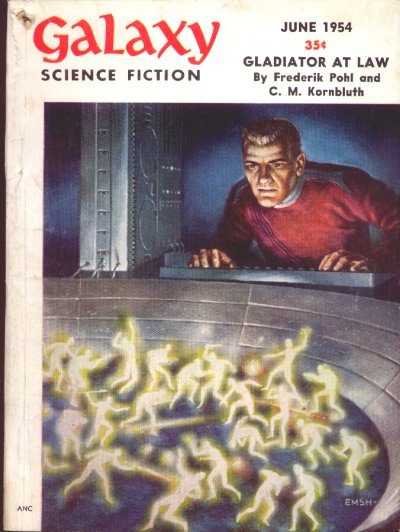
Gladiator-at-Law was serialized in Galaxy Science Fiction in 1954, illustrated by Ed Emshwiller

Gladiator-At-Law is a satirical science fiction novel by American writers Frederik Pohl and Cyril M. Kornbluth. It was first published in 1955 by Ballantine Books and republished in 1986 by Baen Books.

== Plot introduction ==
In this novel corporate lawyers, especially the secretive firm of "Green, Charlesworth", have gained a stranglehold on the world. Business Law is an extremely lucrative career, while Criminal Law pays enough to afford some of the luxuries of life but not enough to save for the future.

Success means living in a luxurious automated "bubble home" constructed by "GML", a corporation which is nominally public but whose shares are never traded openly. All work contracts include GML housing as part of the pay scale. Not having a contract job means having to live in a community such as "Belly Rave", originally a post-war suburban development for returning soldiers, now a slum ruled by gangs of teenagers and children.

For the common people, there are bread-and-circuses entertainments in the form of gladiatorial games of various kinds, with monetary rewards for the winners. Some games pit elderly people against each other armed with padded clubs, but others are more deadly.

There are two main protagonists. One is Norvell Bligh, a nebbish designer of game spectacles for a second-rank corporation who is thrown out of his job and his GML home. His wife returns with him to her roots in the slum, kicking her daughter out to join a gang and bring in some money.

The other is Charles Mundin, an attorney making a living in criminal practice, barred from more lucrative commercial work by the licensing monopolies of the large law firms.

== Plot summary ==
Monmouth City, New Jersey consists of luxurious GML bubble homes which can change shape at the whim of their occupants, and anticipate their every need. At the edge of Monmouth City is the slum of Belly Rave, originally a gimcrack suburb built on a landfill and sold to unsuspecting young couples.

Charles Mundin and Norvell Bligh first meet when Bligh is trying to adopt his stepdaughter, mostly at the behest of his upwardly mobile wife, Virginia. Bligh then returns to work on the next gruesomely spectacular Field Day to be organized by his company, while Mundin visits Republican Party headquarters, where he is introduced to the Lavins by his friend, the local Ward Chairman whose brother also knows Bligh.

Bligh finds himself tricked out of his job by his assistant, abetted by one of the secretaries who is keen to marry a man with a job whose benefits include a GML home. Bligh is arrested when he tries to drown his sorrows, only to find his company credit card has been cancelled. Mundin uses his political connections to have Bligh freed, but then Bligh and his family are unceremoniously dumped in Belly Rave. Virginia is no stranger to the place, but Bligh needs the help of a local, who calls himself Shep.

With Shep's guidance Bligh negotiates the "public assistance" system which ensures that nobody starves, without actually making life worth living. Shep scrapes together materials so he can paint "rainscapes", views of Belly Rave in the rain. Other residents indulge in a kind of barter, or petty theft, extortion, and gang crime, or anesthetize themselves with liquor made from the desserts in their ration packs. Virginia, opportunistic as ever, begins eyeing Shep as a replacement for Norvell.

Mundin eventually visits the Lavins, who live in a different part of Belly Rave, and meets Ryan, a broken-down corporate attorney addicted to "yen-pox", an opiate in the form of crude pills. Ryan has a plan for recovering the shares which Donald Lavin hid away before he was brainwashed, but the initial effort at obtaining records from GML result in Norma Lavin being kidnapped.

Ryan is strangely elated, as it is evident that GML seems to think their activities are a threat, which could give him some leverage in negotiations. He decides to send Mundin to a shareholder's meeting. This entails buying a GML share on Wall Street, which has become a hybrid stock-market and public casino. Mundin braves the touts and thugs of the market to trick his way to buying a share, normally impossible because of the activities of certain brokers. Hiding out in Belly Rave, he meets Bligh, who has become adept in negotiating with the gangs there. Bligh arranges Mundin's safe passage to the company meeting, in a deliberately obscure building on Long Island.

At the meeting Mundin, learning to play off the power brokers against each other, gains access to Norma, who is a "guest" of one faction. Mundin also gains an ally in Bliss Hubble, a "Titan of Industry" who sees in the Lavin's shares a way to unseat the faction currently in control of GML. Recruiting a few more Titans to his cause, he takes the entire party to his elaborate GML bubble-house, which is currently configured as a Gothic mansion, thanks to a household servant with a grudge.

With Bliss's backing, Ryan and Mundin are suddenly a full-fledged law firm with expensive offices. The plan Bliss hatches is to bankrupt GML rather than indulge in a proxy battle. Mundin is dispatched to sabotage certain GML houses, including the model in the Smithsonian, at the same time spreading rumors through his political connections. Bliss bankrolls some illegal medical treatment for Don Lavin, in order to reverse his brainwashing. After this, they are able to recover the Lavins' stock certificates from a bank in Ohio, where GML was founded.

Norvell, meanwhile, is becoming an important man in Belly Rave. His experience catering to crowds in the Field Days allows him to organize the otherwise listless residents to clean the place up and even try some local policing. Shep, meanwhile, has become too close to Virginia, and Bligh has assaulted him with a piece of lead pipe.

At this point the much dreaded firm of "Green, Charlesworth" intervene. They occupy the entire Empire State Building on the otherwise uninhabited island of Manhattan. Rather than send their minions to shut down the plot, they grant Norma Lavin and Mundin an "audience" at their headquarters. Here they are revealed to be a grotesque pair of ancient human beings, a man and a woman, trapped in husks of bodies in glass cases, but able to exert influence with their minds, their devices, and their money. They own GML and have used it to rule their world. They claim to be centuries old, having "fixed Mr. Lincoln's wagon" and they threaten to do the same to Mundin and the Lavins. Mundin identifies them as the Struldbrugs described by satirist Jonathan Swift.

Returning to their offices, Mundin and Norma find that only Bliss Hubble and the increasingly comatose Ryan are still on their side. They resolve to carry on regardless, but then chaos ensues as listening devices planted by Green, Charlesworth explode around them. In the confusion, Donald disappears, responding to a subliminal signal as if he is still brainwashed.

They find him at the Field Day, entered in an event where he walks a tightrope across a pool of piranha while under a hail of rocks from the crowd. Despite their efforts at bribing the mob not to throw anything, aided by threats from Bligh's teenage gangsters, Donald falls into the pool. Bligh is ready to sacrifice himself to save Donald, but instead the tortured artist Shep throws himself in with the fish.

Declaring war on GML and Green, Charlesworth, they return to Wall Street, where Mundin starts a run on the market by carefully selling off large chunks of the GML stock. After a while the selling takes on a life of its own, despite the efforts of various people, acting unwittingly on behalf of Green, Charlesworth, to have Mundin arrested on trumped-up charges, or to discourage him from selling.

As the market collapses, the plotters are left with large amounts of cash, which they use to buy up GML and other companies at bargain prices. At the end they are counting their riches and savoring their triumph, just as Green, Charlesworth, across the water in Manhattan, destroy themselves in a nuclear explosion.

== Characters ==
- Charles Mundin, lawyer
- Norvell Bligh, a Company man
- Donald and Norma Lavin, the twin children of one of the two co-inventors of the automated, self-maintaining GML House.
- Bliss Hubble, addicted to power
- Virginia Bligh, the once and future Belly Raver, is a survivor
- "Shep", painter

== Reception ==
Groff Conklin praised the novel as "a grimly unforgettable item that delivers an extra punch on a second reading."
