= The Little Black Bag =

- Short story by Cyril M. Kornbluth
- Language: English
- Genre: Science fiction

Publication
- Published in: Astounding Science Fiction
- Publication type: Magazine
- Publication date: 1950

"The Little Black Bag" is a science fiction novelette by American writer Cyril M. Kornbluth (1923–1958), first published in the July 1950 edition of Astounding Science Fiction magazine. The story concerns a futuristic medical (doctor's) bag accidentally sent back in time several centuries to the mid-twentieth century, the ethics of this occurrence, and the turmoil that ensues.

== Plot summary ==
In the future of 2450 A.D., the majority of humanity exhibits reduced intelligence and is supervised (though unaware of that fact) by a superintelligent minority in order to maintain the semblance of social normality. A "physicist" goads his minder into giving him specifications for a time machine, which he uses to send a "doctor" friend's automated medical kit (the titular black bag) into the past. The bag is found by Dr. Full, an alcoholic physician who no longer practices medicine. Attributing its extraordinary properties to advances made since he last practiced, he uses it to heal a seriously injured young child. The patient's eighteen-year-old sister, Angie, discovers the futuristic patent application date on one of the instruments and grasps the financial opportunities. She blackmails Full into taking her on as a partner.

The responsibility helps Full recover from alcoholism. He is soon running a clinic with the help of Angie, with his patients being blindfolded during procedures. While Full is content to simply treat injuries and illnesses, Angie wants to specialize in the more lucrative field of plastic surgery. When Angie learns that he intends to turn the bag over to the medical establishment for the good of humanity, she grabs it and tries to leave. In the ensuing scuffle, the instruments spill out. Without thinking, Angie stabs Full with a surgical knife meant for amputations, killing him. Initially shocked, she quickly recovers and disposes of the body in the bag's incinerator.

Angie's next patient accidentally sees the sharp instruments and balks at the surgery. To reassure her, Angie demonstrates their safety by harmlessly running a scalpel through her arm. Unconvinced, the client requests another test. Meanwhile, in 2450 A.D., a technician notes the bag has been used for murder and deactivates it. Angie runs what has just become an ordinary scalpel across her own throat, with fatal results. The bag's contents rust and decompose soon after.

== Accolades ==
"The Little Black Bag" won the 2001 Retroactive Hugo Award for Best Novelette (of 1951) and was also recognized as the 13th-best all-time short science fiction story in a 1971 poll by the Washington Science Fiction Association, tied with "Microcosmic God" by Theodore Sturgeon. (The poll was published in "The Reference Library" column of the October and November 1971 issues of Analog Science Fiction and Fact magazine.) It was among the stories selected in 1970 by the Science Fiction Writers of America as one of the best science fiction short stories published before the creation of the Nebula Awards. As such, it was published in The Science Fiction Hall of Fame Volume One, 1929–1964.

== Adaptations ==
"The Little Black Bag" was the basis of episodes (using the same title) in three television series: Tales of Tomorrow in 1952, Out of the Unknown in 1969 (only part of this adaptation is known to exist), and Night Gallery in 1970.
