= Larry Shaw (editor) =

American editor and author (1924–1985)

Lawrence Shaw
- Born: November 9, 1924
- Died: April 1, 1985 (aged 60)
- Occupations: editor, author
- Writing career
- Pen name: Larry T. Shaw
- Genre: science fiction

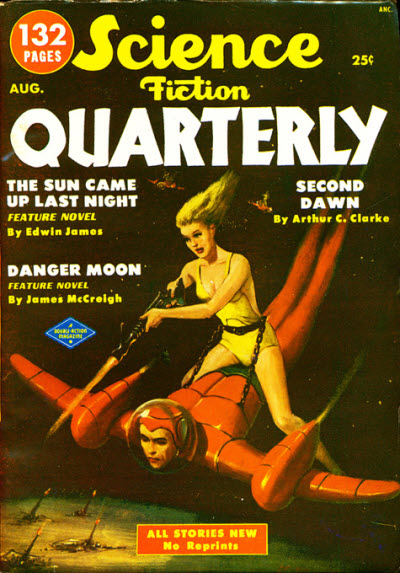
Shaw's "Seeds of Insecurity" was the cover story on the August 1951 issue of Science Fiction Quarterly

Lawrence Taylor Shaw (November 9, 1924 – April 1, 1985) was an American Hugo Award-winning science fiction fan, author, editor and literary agent who usually published as Larry T. Shaw.

== Early career as a writer and editor ==
Shaw joined a group of science fiction writers known as the Futurians during the early 1940s. From 1948 through the early 1950s, he wrote short fiction before becoming an editor for the magazines If and later Infinity Science Fiction. He published Harlan Ellison's first magazine story "Glowworm" (1955) in Infinity Science Fiction, after Ellison's first sale to EC Comics.

From 1954 to 1955 Shaw edited Rodding and Re-Styling, an automotive sports magazine.

== Monster movie magazines and new career as a literary agent ==
After those magazines terminated during 1958, Shaw edited monster movie magazines, automotive magazines and other material until 1963, when he began editing for Irwin Stein's company Lancer Books. He continued working as an editor until 1975, when he began work mainly as a literary agent. He received a Special Hugo Award during 1984 for lifetime achievement as an editor.

== Marriages and death ==
Shaw was married to science fiction and Spur Award-winning Western fiction author Lee Hoffman from 1956 to 1958. He later married Noreen Kane (1930–2005). Shaw died of cancer on April 1 1985.

== Sources ==
- Ashley, Mike (2005). Transformations: The Story of the Science Fiction Magazines from 1950 to 1970. Liverpool: Liverpool University Press. ISBN 0-85323-779-4.
