= Infinity Science Fiction =

1950s US science fiction magazine

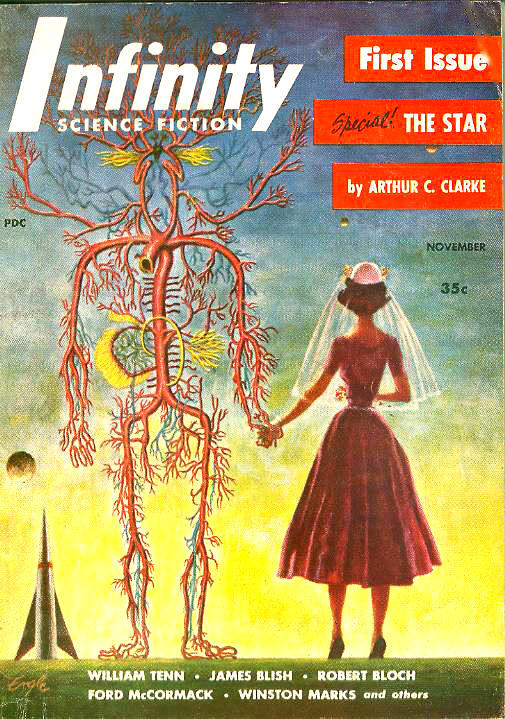
- Cover of the first issue; artwork by Robert Engle
- Editor: Larry T. Shaw
- Publisher: Royal Publications
- First issue: November 1955; 70 years ago
- Final issue: November 1958
- Country: United States
- Language: English

Infinity Science Fiction was an American science fiction magazine, edited by Larry T. Shaw, and published by Royal Publications. The first issue, which appeared in November 1955, included Arthur C. Clarke's "The Star", a story about a planet destroyed by a nova (an exploding star) that turns out to have been the Star of Bethlehem; it won the Hugo Award for that year. Shaw obtained stories from some of the leading writers of the day, including Brian Aldiss, Isaac Asimov, and Robert Sheckley, but the material was of variable quality. In 1958 Irwin Stein, the owner of Royal Publications, decided to shut down Infinity; the last issue was dated November 1958.

The title was revived a decade later by Stein's publishing house, Lancer Books, as a paperback anthology series. Five volumes were published between 1970 and 1973, edited by Robert Hoskins; a sixth was prepared but withdrawn after Lancer ran into financial problems at the end of 1973.

== Publication history ==
American science fiction (sf) magazines first appeared in the 1920s with the launch of Amazing Stories, a pulp magazine published by Hugo Gernsback. The beginnings of science fiction as a separately marketed genre can be traced to this time, and by the end of the 1930s the field was undergoing its first boom. World War II and its attendant paper shortages led to the demise of several titles, but by the late 1940s the market began to recover. From a low of eight active magazines in 1946, the field expanded to twenty in 1950, and dozens more commenced publication over the next decade. Infinity Science Fiction was launched in the middle of this publishing boom.

In 1954, Irwin and Helen Stein started a publishing company, Royal Publications, and launched two magazines, Celebrity and Our Life, edited by Larry Shaw. Shaw left to edit a hot-rod magazine; when they started Infinity the following year he returned to Royal to become the editor. The first issue of Infinity was on newsstands in September 1955, with a November cover date. The Steins also launched Suspect Detective Stories, a crime magazine, the same month, and gave it to Shaw to edit, but converted it to science fiction after five issues, retitling it Science Fiction Adventures.

At the end of the 1950s, Irwin Stein decided to start two media-related magazines, Monster Parade and Monsters and Things, to take advantage of the new interest in horror and science fiction movies. Science Fiction Adventures, which had been suffering from poor sales, was cancelled; the last issue was dated June 1958, and Infinity's last issue followed in November. To save money over the last two issues Stein made a deal to acquire some lower-priced material and took over story selection from Shaw.

In 1961, Irwin Stein and Walter Zacharius founded Lancer Books, and in 1963 Shaw was hired to be Lancer's editor; he was replaced by Robert Hoskins in 1968. Hoskins tried to persuade Stein to restart Infinity, but their financial projections implied it would require a circulation of 50,000 to be profitable; Stein thought this unlikely for a magazine but possible for a paperback anthology series. The first in the series, Infinity One, appeared in January 1970, and four more appeared over the next three years, ending with Infinity Five in 1973. A sixth volume was prepared for publication but Lancer went bankrupt in November of that year. The book was cancelled, and Hoskins returned the manuscripts to the authors.

== Contents and reception ==
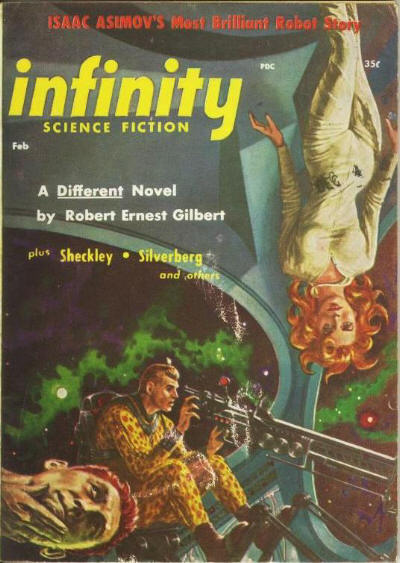
Cover of the February 1957 issue, by Ed Emshwiller

Shaw knew the science fiction field well, and was friends with many established writers, so he was occasionally able to acquire good stories. The first issue included "The Star", by Arthur C. Clarke, about a planet destroyed by a nova (an exploding star): the light from the nova was seen from Earth as the Star of Bethlehem. A sequel, by Betsy Curtis, appeared in the June 1956 issue. "The Star", which won the Hugo award for that year's best short story, had originally been submitted to The Observer in the UK for a short-story contest, but did not win any of the prizes. It was rejected by several publishers in the US before Shaw bought it; Clarke recorded that The Saturday Evening Post turned it down on the grounds that it was "blasphemous".

Harlan Ellison's first science fiction sale, "Glowworm", appeared in the second issue, and Shaw was able to publish much early work by Robert Silverberg. Notable stories included "Dio" by Damon Knight and "Who Can Replace a Man?" by Brian Aldiss. Shaw was able to obtain material by established writers such as Isaac Asimov, Robert Sheckley, Lester del Rey, Algis Budrys, and Jack Vance, though in the opinion of science fiction historian Joseph Marchesani these stories were in many cases not among the authors' best work. Shaw was unhappy with the last two issues, for which Stein had taken over editorial duties, and Marchesani comments that the quality of those issues was "depressing to say the least".

Knight provided a book review column, and a good deal of the material in his critical collection In Search of Wonder initially appeared in Infinity; Knight left to edit If in 1958, and Silverberg took over the book reviews for the last three issues. Shaw also included a column titled "Fanfare" as a regular feature, which reprinted material from science-fiction fanzines. The artwork for the first issue's cover was provided by Robert Engle, but all the remaining covers were painted by Ed Emshwiller.

The title page of the first anthology, Infinity One, said it was "a magazine of speculative fiction in book form", but it did not include the nonfiction sections or review columns that appeared in most magazines, printing nothing but fiction and some brief introductory material. Infinity One reprinted Clarke's "The Star", but that was the only reprint Hoskins used in the series. The same volume included George Zebrowski's first story, "The Water Sculptor of Station 233". Silverberg and Barry Malzberg had stories in each of the five volumes, and other contributors included established names such as Poul Anderson, Gordon R. Dickson, and Clifford D. Simak, along with newer writers such as Ed Bryant and Dean R. Koontz.

Assessments of Infinity by science fiction historians vary. Mike Ashley describes Infinity as "essentially an adventure magazine aiming at a juvenile readership", and Marchesani calls Shaw "an editor of the middle echelon". Malcolm Edwards considers it "one of the most interesting of the flood of new sf magazines in the early and mid-1950s". In Edwards' opinion it became "one of the leading sf magazines of its period". David Kyle describes it as "exceptional", and writer and critic Algis Budrys calls Infinity "Larry Shaw's short-lived but immortal magazine". Edwards assesses the anthology series as "competent but not outstanding".

== Bibliographical details ==
Issues of Infinity Science Fiction showing volume/issue number
Year	Jan	Feb	Mar	Apr	May	Jun	Jul	Aug	Sep	Oct	Nov	Dec
1955											1/1	
1956		1/2				1/3		1/4		1/5		1/6
1957		2/1		2/2		2/3	2/4		2/5	2/6	3/1	
1958	3/2		3/3	3/4		3/5		3/6		4/1	4/2	
Larry Shaw was editor throughout.

The magazine was published by Royal Publications, and was edited by Larry Shaw for all twenty issues. The first issue was dated November 1955; the schedule varied, with a bimonthly period from June 1956 to Jun 1957, followed by an attempt to keep to a six-weekly schedule for over a year. At the time it was cancelled in October 1958, Shaw was hoping to switch to a monthly schedule.

The volume numbering was regular, three volumes of six numbers each and a final volume of two numbers. All issues were digest-sized, 128 pages, and priced at 35 cents.

The anthology series were all edited by Robert Hoskins and appeared once each year from 1970 to 1973, except for 1972, during which Infinity Three and Infinity Four both appeared. The first anthology was priced at 75 cents; the remaining four were 95 cents.

== See also ==
- List of science fiction magazines

== Sources ==
- Ashley, Michael (1976). The History of the Science Fiction Magazine Vol. 3 1946–1955. Chicago: Contemporary Books, Inc. ISBN 0-8092-7842-1.
- Ashley, Mike (1985). "Infinity". In Tymn, Marshall B.; Ashley, Mike (eds.). Science Fiction, Fantasy and Weird Fiction Magazines. Westport, Connecticut: Greenwood Press. pp. 789–790. ISBN 0-313-21221-X.
- Ashley, Mike (2005). Transformations: The Story of the Science Fiction Magazines from 1950 to 1970. Liverpool: Liverpool University Press. ISBN 0-85323-779-4.
- Ashley, Mike (2007). Gateways to Forever: The Story of the Science-Fiction Magazines from 1970 to 1980. Liverpool: Liverpool University Press. ISBN 978-1-84631-003-4.
- Budrys, Algis (March 1987). "Books". The Magazine of Fantasy & Science Fiction. 72 (3): 14–20.
- Edwards, Malcolm (1981) [1979]. "Shaw, Larry T.". In Nicholls, Peter (ed.). The Encyclopedia of Science Fiction. St. Albans, UK: Granada. p. 541. ISBN 0-586-05380-8.
- Edwards, Malcolm; Nicholls, Peter (1993). "SF Magazines". In Clute, John; Nicholls, Peter (eds.). The Encyclopedia of Science Fiction. New York: St. Martin's Press. pp. 1066–1071. ISBN 0-312-09618-6.
- Kyle, David (1977) [1976]. A Pictorial History of Science Fiction. Feltham, UK: Hamlyn. ISBN 0-600-38193-5.
- Marchesani, Joseph (1985). "Infinity Science Fiction". In Tymn, Marshall B.; Ashley, Mike (eds.). Science Fiction, Fantasy and Weird Fiction Magazines. Westport, Connecticut: Greenwood Press. pp. 352–355. ISBN 0-313-21221-X.
- McAleer, Neil (2013). Sir Arthur C. Clarke: Odyssey of a Visionary. New York: Rosetta. ISBN 978-0-8092-3720-3.
- Nicholls, Peter; Clute, John (1993). "Genre SF". In Clute, John; Nicholls, Peter (eds.). The Encyclopedia of Science Fiction. New York: St. Martin's Press. pp. 483–484. ISBN 0-312-09618-6.
- Stableford, Brian (1993). "Amazing Stories". In Clute, John; Nicholls, Peter (eds.). The Encyclopedia of Science Fiction. New York: St. Martin's Press. pp. 25–26. ISBN 0-312-09618-6.
- Weinberg, Robert (1988). "Emshwiller, Edmund Alexander". In Weinberg, Robert (ed.). A Biographical Dictionary of Science Fiction and Fantasy Artists. Westport, Connecticut: Greenwood Press. pp. 101–105. ISBN 0-313-24349-2.
