= Bourdon =

Bourdon derives from the French for bumblebee, and may refer to:

- Bourdon (bell), the lowest bell in a set
- Bourdon, a Pilgrim's staff
- Bourdon (organ pipe), a stopped organ pipe of a construction favored for low pitches
- Bourdon (surname)
- Drone (music): The lowest course of a lute, or the lowest drone pipe of a bagpipe, sometimes called a bourdon
- Faux bourdon, fauxbourdon, faburden or falsobordone, terms applied (without perfect consistency) to a variety of music compositional techniques
- Bourdon, Somme, a small town in France
- Bourdon (grape), another name for the French wine grape Douce noir

== See also ==
- Bourdon gauge or Bourdon tube, named after Eugène Bourdon
- Boudon
  - Boudon noir, an alternative name for the Italian wine grape Dolcetto
- Boudin (disambiguation)
- Burden (disambiguation)
