= Eugene Bourdon =

Eugene Bourdon may refer to:

- Eugène Bourdon (1808–1884), French watchmaker, inventor of the Bourdon tube pressure gauge
- Eugene Bourdon (architect) (1870–1916), French architect
