= Bourdon (surname) =

Bourdon is a surname. Notable people with the surname include:

- Amé Bourdon (1636 or 1638–1706), French physician and anatomist
- Benjamin B. Bourdon (1860–1943), French psychologist
- Eugene Bourdon (1870–1916), French architect
- Eugène Bourdon (1808–1884), French watchmaker and engineer
- François Louis Bourdon (1758–1797), French politician
- Luc Bourdon (1987–2008), Canadian hockey player
- Luc Bourdon (born 1952), Canadian documentary filmmaker
- Rob Bourdon (born 1979), drummer, Linkin Park
- Rosario Bourdon (1885–1961), Québécois musician
- Sébastien Bourdon (1616–1671), French painter
- William Bourdon (born 1956), French lawyer, secretary-general of the International Federation of Human Rights Leagues, and founder of Sherpa
