= Frederick C. Painton =

American writer (1895–1945)

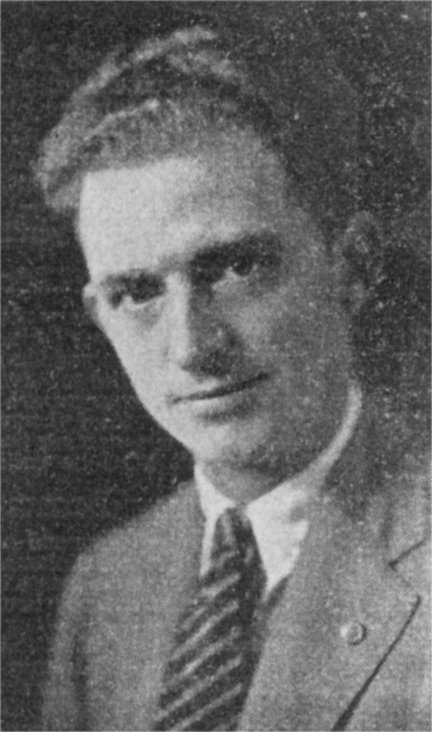
- Born: Frederick Charles Painton; July 15, 1895; Elmira, New York
- Died: March 31, 1945 (aged 49); Guam
- Education: Columbia University
- Occupations: Journalist, publicist, pulp-fiction author, war correspondent
- Known for: Veterans advocacy, WWII reporting

Frederick Charles Painton was a World War I veteran, a newspaper journalist, a high-ranking member of the American Legion, a prolific pulp-fiction author in the 1920s and 1930s, and a World War II correspondent who covered action in North Africa, Italy, and the South Pacific.

== Background ==
George Painton (1847–1917) and his son, George Painton (1871–1921), came to Elmira, New York in 1871. The elder Painton founded an Elmira institution, Painton’s Bakery, which his son took over in due course. They were Frederick C. Painton’s grandfather and father. Frederick’s mother was Georgia Abigail Bailey Painton (1876–1966). Frederick was born and raised in Elmira. He had two younger siblings, Norman Shaw Painton (1903–66) and Edith E. (1907–2001).

Fred Painton described his youth as a “boyhood that was devoted to many things other than study.” At age 12, he wrote a novel, Blood and Glory, which he read aloud in a barn to ten “cronies”. He began a journalism career in 1916, starting as a $7 a week proofreader. With a population nearing 40,000, Elmira had several newspapers. At various times, Painton worked for the Advertiser, the Telegram, and the Herald. For the Advertiser, he was “the police reporter, sports editor, and general star reporter,” at $9 a week.

== World War I ==
In August 1917, as the U.S. geared up for war, Frederick was deemed physically fit by his local Draft Selection Board.

At Camp Dix, New Jersey, he was rejected for combat duty “because of a slight heart affliction.” He went from Camp Dix to San Antonio, Texas, to train for an aviation support role. He became an automobile driver. In January, Private 1st Class Painton embarked from Hoboken, New Jersey on the S.S. Carpathia as a member of the 229th Aero Supply Squadron, and landed in Glasgow. By the end of the month, owing to the shortage of men, he’d made sergeant, at $40 per month. He wrote home frequently, letters which were reprinted in the Elmira Star-Gazette. In one, he described the horrors inflicted upon the Belgians by the “Hun.”

In September 1918, Frederick was exposed to gas in the Battle of Saint-Mihiel. In another incident during the battle, he was “thrown by the concussion of a shell.” He was unable to sleep without opiates. Nevertheless, he persevered in his duties.

In a letter of October 1, 1918, he described taking his first flight in an airplane, a 14-minute “joyhop” in the rear cockpit of a two-seater which reached an altitude of 1,200 feet. He called it a “most wonderful experience.”

He was in Paris when the Armistice was signed on November 11. He described how “the Parisiens . . . went mad, simply mad, with joy . . . we were violently assaulted by vivacious French girls and strenuously kissed.”

By the end of November, he had joined the staff of the Stars and Stripes, the official publication of the American Expeditionary Forces (AEF). In December, as a reporter, he entered Germany with the Army of Occupation.

His injuries finally caught up with him. In late October, he had been hospitalized for a week. In early 1919, he “suddenly collapsed and was forced to give up his work.” He wrote home, “my stomach is gone, my nerves are gone, and, as you know, I already had a bad heart.” After spending more time in a New York hospital, by April he finally made it back to Elmira, returning to work on the Advertiser staff.

== American Legion ==
In March 1919, in Paris, members of the AEF founded the American Legion, a veterans’ organization. In May, with 50 former servicemen present, Painton was elected permanent secretary of the Harry B. Bentley Post, his local Legion branch. Soon, he was presiding over their meetings. In September, he was named to the publicity committee for a nationwide Legion membership drive. In October, he joined the Elmira delegation at the state convention in Rochester.

== Journalism ==
In late October 1919, Painton resigned his Legion position to take a job on the reportorial staff of the Jamestown Post, western New York. On January 15, 1920, using a government benefit, he entered the Columbia University Pulitzer School of Journalism, in Manhattan. He soon distinguished himself in another arena by making the varsity golf team.

Painton worked nights as a “rewrite man” for the New York Telegram and the New York Tribune. In his free time, he took on journalism jobs, for instance, as a sports reporter for the Associated Press Boston Bureau during the summer of 1921. His first known bylined piece was an article about stray dog rescue in the November 25, 1921 New York Post. Two months later, he landed a bylined piece in the American Legion Weekly, the official magazine of the Legion. His article, a defense of veterans accused of a crime wave, began a lifelong association with the magazine.

On July 3, 1922, he married Kathryn (Kay) Phykitt (1904–83) in Manhattan.

== American Legion Publicity Director ==
After finishing at Columbia, Class of '23, Painton worked for the Tribune. In late 1923, he and Kay moved to Indianapolis, the Legion headquarters, where he became the assistant director of the American Legion Weekly. He soon became the Legion’s publicity director. The job entailed frequent travel: accompanying the national commander on trips, meeting with local bureaus; and promoting conventions, veterans’ issues, and the Legion’s charitable activities. In June 1924, following a resignation, Painton was appointed director of the Legion’s national news bureau. He continued to write for the weekly.

On July 6, 1926, Frederick C. Painton Jr. (1926–2021), destined to be an only child, was born in Indianapolis.

In 1926, Painton was involved in the planning for thousands of Legionnaires to convene in Paris in September 1927 for the 9th annual convention of the Legion. In April 1927, he made a preparatory trip to France. In August, he returned with the Legion leadership. On August 26, they were hosted by France’s president Gaston Doumergue. After the rousing success of the convention, Painton finally made it back to Indianapolis in October.

== Pulp writer ==
In the late 1920s, the pulp magazine market was booming. New titles regularly showed up on newsstands. A hot new genre was Great War fiction, ignited by Dell’s War Stories which debuted with a November 1926 cover date. About April 1927, Fawcett Publications announced a rival, Battle Stories. Editor Jack Smalley wrote that “tales of warfare in all its branches are wanted, and particularly stories of fighting in France. . . . A war-story serial is needed at once.” The first issue hit the stands on August 10 with a September cover date.

According to Painton, Fawcett engaged him to write a 40,000-word serial. It's unknown who made the overture, but as an eyewitness to the war, and a seasoned journalist, he was a promising prospect for writing war fiction. During the visit for the Legion convention, Painton wrote: “I’m searching France for war stories, and finding plenty.” His short novel, The Spy Trap, played out through the first four issues of Battle Stories (Sep–Dec).

Enamored of his success, and swamped by continuing requests for stories, Painton resigned his position with the Legion. His stories appeared in Battle Stories regularly. He became one of the star writers alongside Arthur Guy Empey, author of the bestselling Great War novel Over the Top. Over the next 15 years, Painton was primarily a successful pulp writer who occasionally appeared in the American Legion Monthly/Magazine, or in mainstream magazines like Liberty and Collier's.

Through 1930, Painton’s published work appeared predominantly in two Fawcett magazines, Battle Stories, and Triple-X Magazine to which he contributed a handful of genre-hybrid western-aviation stories. In stories like “Cowboy, Get That Zep!” (April 1929), a cowpuncher gives the Germans a lesson in toughness. In 1931, he claimed to Air Trails magazine that he'd been a flier in the war: “My training was at the Second [Air Instruction Center] at Tours, France, where we cracked up with singular regularity . . . Aside from practice landings and take-offs, our main object in life was to go 'châteauing' down the Loirs [sic] River. This consisted of hedge-hopping the crate at an altitude of some sixty to a hundred feet.” These accounts are not supported by the contemporaneous record, but, rather, were typical of the ways pulp writers marketed themselves to readers.

As the Great War trenches lost favor with readers, Painton diversified his markets, selling to Street & Smith, Dell, the Thrilling pulps, and others. He also diversified his genres, selling detective and adventure stories to a variety of publishers. His peak year may have been 1936 when 34 of his stories appeared in pulp magazines. He appeared well over 300 times in pulp magazines, which includes short stories, short novels, and serial installments. Ultimately, his output spread about equally among three genres: war/military aviation, detective/crime, and adventure. He was a perfectionist. His agent Ed Bodin recalled him throwing down a just-completed manuscript, saying, “This makes me sick; what would it do to an editor?”

The income supported a comfortable lifestyle. Summers were spent at home in Westport, Connecticut, winters in Fort Lauderdale. In early 1932, Painton spent several months touring the Mediterranean, from France to the Middle East, to gain fresh settings for his fiction. As part of the trip, he lived with a regiment of the French Foreign Legion. “They made me realize I was too old for that sort of thing,” he said.

He enjoyed ocean fishing. An avid golfer, he always finished among the leaders in the annual American Writers and Artists’ Society summer golf tournament, usually held at the Palm Beach Country Club. In 1938, he finally won, beating popular novelist (and 1904 Olympian) Rex Beach.

== World War II ==
Starting in 1939, Painton visited state American Legion bureaus to profile them for the American Legion Magazine. The first of these was “On Wisconsin, and How!” (February 1939); the last was “The Kansas Way” (July 1942). By then, the U.S. was at war. An early taste of the war came in April 1942, when he described what it was like being in a submarine submerged in the Pacific.

In December 1942, Reader's Digest engaged Painton as a war correspondent. He also published a number of dispatches in the Saturday Evening Post and other magazines. He made two extended trips to the Mediterranean (1943, 1944) and one to the Pacific Theater (1945).

He had several close calls. In January, while flying with a contingent of correspondents from Algiers in an Army Transport to cover the Casablanca Conference, the plane diverted due to low visibility and flew near Spanish Morocco where it was struck by antiaircraft fire. Painton was sitting on a pile of parachutes with CBC reporter Edward Baudry. Baudry was hit in the forehead and died in a French Morocco hospital 75 minutes later, the first Allied correspondent killed in the North African campaign. In another incident, Painton was aboard a troopship that was torpedoed. Survivors were rescued by escort vessels. In both instances, he lost all his belongings.

He covered the Battle of Kasserine Pass, Tunisia (February 19–24), which pitted U.S. and British forces against Rommel's Afrika Korps and an Italian armored division. On the decisive day of February 22, when the Allies halted Rommel's advance, Painton watched from high ground as the two sides traded tank and artillery fire for hours while as many as 127 fighting aircraft were in the air at once.

Painton’s first original (not abridged from another source) article in Reader's Digest was “Secret Mission to North Africa” (May 1943), a report on the reconnaissance mission that preceded Operation Torch, the Allied invasion. Like all his magazine pieces, military censorship ensured that operational details were left vague.

Painton was slightly wounded on a ship off of Sicily that was bombed. Still, he covered the Allied invasion of Sicily (July–August 1943), embedded with General Patton’s army. He interviewed Patton for the Digest. He narrated the “human details” of the invasion for CBS Radio.

While in the theater, Painton got to know famed war correspondent Ernie Pyle. “He was one of my dear friends,” Pyle wrote. “Fred and I have traveled through lots of war together. We did those bitter cold days early in Tunisia, and we were the last stragglers out of Sicily.” Both Painton and Pyle returned to the U.S. in September 1943, departing Algiers four hours apart. While recuperating in Fort Lauderdale, Painton wrote a profile of Pyle for the Saturday Evening Post. “In telling the details of his life to me,” Painton wrote, “[Pyle] was puttering around a German Volkswagon, an enemy command car that an admiring provost marshal of military police had given him.” However, the article was minimally forthcoming about their relationship and joint travels.

Painton was soon back in Europe, covering events in Italy, including the Battle of Monte Cassino (January 17-May 18, 1944) and the Battle of Anzio (January 22-June 5). A trip to the Middle East resulted in “Report on Palestine” (Reader's Digest, May 1944). Back in Italy, he reported on the devastation in Naples. In October, he returned to the U.S., ending his second trip.

In 1945, he traveled to the South Pacific, landing with the Marines at Iwo Jima in February. In another close call, a journalist standing next to him was shot.

== Death ==
On March 31, 3:30 a.m., on a Guam air strip, Painton lingered to wave farewell to a B-29 bomber crew who were taking off for Japan. The pilot waved to Painton from the cockpit only to see him raise his arm to wave back and then collapse, stricken by a fatal heart attack. It was noted that he'd been ill in the Philippines while living with the crew. Painton's death was reported nationwide. Tributes came from General Eisenhower, General MacArthur, General Omar Bradley, and General Mark Clark. Admiral Nimitz wrote: “Fred Painton was one of the most thoroughly liked war correspondents accredited to us. He died in the service of his country just as surely as those who have given their lives on the field of battle.” He was buried in a military cemetery overlooking Agat beach.

At the time, Ernie Pyle was covering the Battle of Okinawa. When he heard about Painton’s death, he immediately wrote his next column as a memorial.

[Painton] had grown pretty weary of war. . . . But I’m sure he had no inkling of death, for he told me in Guam of his postwar plans to take his family and start on an ideal and easy life of six months in Europe, six in America. . . . But somehow I’m glad he didn’t have to go through the unnatural terror of dying on the battlefield.

Within days, Pyle was killed by machine-gun fire on Okinawa. His homage to Painton, his last completed column, was widely published on April 28, 1945.

On September, 20, 1948, the Pentagon installed a plaque in memory of 45 war correspondents who died in World War II. Painton and Pyle were included.

In 1949, Painton’s remains, as well as Pyle’s, were interred at the National Memorial Cemetery of the Pacific, Honolulu.

== Selected journalism ==
- “A Port of Good Luck for Sick Stray Dogs,” New York Post, November 25, 1921 [first known bylined article]
- “Wuxtry! Art Burks' Plot Clicks,” Writer’s Digest, April 1936 [only writers’ magazine piece]
- “The Private Lives of Ocean Fish,” Outdoor Life, April 1939
- “Minnesota Masters Marihuana,” American Legion Magazine, June 1940
- “The Coming Air War,” by Igor Sikorsky, The Atlantic Monthly, September 1942 [as told to Frederick C. Painton]
- “Secret Mission to North Africa,” Reader's Digest, May 1943
- “The Hoosier Letter Writer,” The Saturday Evening Post, October 2, 1943 [Ernie Pyle portrait]
- “Fighting With Confetti,” American Legion Magazine, December 1943 [Sicily]
- “Dirty Work on the Road to Rome,” The Saturday Evening Post, February 19, 1944
- “With Head Held High,” American Legion Magazine, March 1944 [Algiers]
- “Report on Palestine,” Reader's Digest, May 1944
- “Naples: City of Panic and Famine,” Reader's Digest, July 1944
- “This War Is Down Our Alley,” The Saturday Evening Post, December 16, 1944 [Southern France]
- “How Mussolini Fell,” Harper's Magazine, January 1945
- “Up Front with Bill Mauldin,” The Saturday Evening Post, March 17, 1945
- “The Grim Lesson,” Collier's, April 14, 1945 [Iwo Jima]
- “Why We Must Bomb Japanese Cities,” Reader's Digest, May 1945

== Selected fiction ==
- “The Letter,” Argosy All-Story Weekly, June 18, 1927 [first known published fiction]
- A Yank in the Foreign Legion (4-part serial), Battle Stories, September–December 1928
- The Conquest of America (5-part serial), Battle Stories, October 1929–February 1930
- The Phantom Spad (4-part serial), Air Trails, February–May 1931
- “The Coil of the Cobra,” Blue Steel Magazine, March 1932
- “The Head of Per-Neb,” All Detective Magazine, January 1933
- “The Lady Liked Emeralds,” American Magazine, August 1933
- “Sky Guilt,” The Lone Eagle, November 1933
- “The Veil of Vishnu,” Strange Detective Stories, December 1933
- “Emperor of Asia,” Thrilling Adventures, September 1934
- “Nightstick Nemesis,” Gold Seal Detective, January 1936
- “Narcotic Man,” Popular Detective, March 1936 [first appearance of detective Duffy Kildare]
- The Invasion of America (6-part serial), Argosy, July 16–August 20, 1938
- “One Thousand Percent,” Popular Sports Magazine, April 1939
- “Two Paris Knights,” Popular Detective, August 1940 [newsmen in Paris]
- “Death on the Nile,” Five-Novels Monthly, August 1941
- “Encounter in Stamboul,” Blue Book, December 1942
- “One Blonde—Dead,” Flynn’s Detective Fiction, February 1943
- “A Clean Nose,” Crack Detective, May 1944 [last fiction published in his lifetime]
- “When Hate Shall Rise,” Short Stories, July 10, 1946 [with Ed Bodin]

== Reprinted Fiction ==
- The Conquest of America. High Adventure #82. Silver Spring, MD: Adventure House. 2005. ISBN 978-1597980036. [serialized in Battle Stories, October 1929–February 1930]
- Squadron of the Dead. Orchard Park, NY: Age of Aces Books. 2016. ISBN 978-1-937590093. [from Sky Birds, 1935]
- The Invasion of America. Boston, MA: Steeger Books. 2022. ISBN 978-1618276797. [serialized in Argosy, 7/16–8/20/1938]

== Resources ==
- Thomas A. Rumer, The American Legion: An Official History, 1919-1989 (New York: M. Evans & Company, Inc., 1990).
- "Frederick C. Painton page". Age of Aces. December 18, 2020.. Reprints a number of Painton’s WWI letters home.
