= Boudin (disambiguation) =

A boudin is a type of sausage. It may also refer to:

- Boudin Bakery in San Francisco
- Boudinage, a geological feature
- Le Boudin, the march of the French Foreign Legion

== People ==
- Boudin (surname)

== See also ==
- Bodin (surname)
