= Cosmic Stories and Stirring Science Stories =

Two related US pulp science fiction magazines

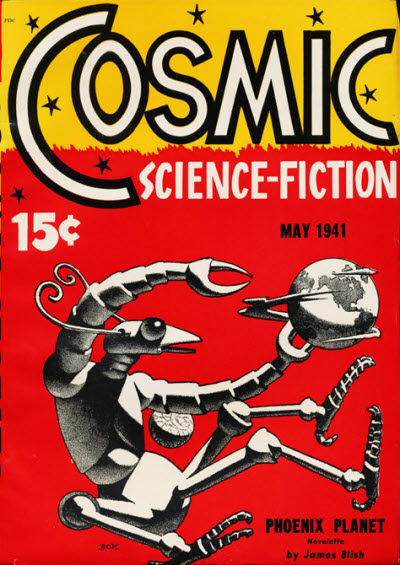
The May 1941 issue of Cosmic Science-Fiction; cover art by Hannes Bok

Cosmic Stories (also known as Cosmic Science-Fiction) and Stirring Science Stories were two American pulp science fiction magazines that published a total of seven issues in 1941 and 1942. Both Cosmic and Stirring were edited by Donald A. Wollheim and launched by the same publisher, appearing in alternate months. Wollheim had no budget at all for fiction, so he solicited stories from his friends among the Futurians, a group of young science fiction fans including James Blish and C. M. Kornbluth. Isaac Asimov contributed a story, but later insisted on payment after hearing that F. Orlin Tremaine, the editor of the competing science fiction magazine Comet, was irate at the idea of a magazine that might "siphon readership from magazines that paid", and thought that authors who contributed should be blacklisted. Kornbluth was the most prolific contributor, under several pseudonyms; one of his stories, "Thirteen O'Clock", published under the pseudonym "Cecil Corwin", was very successful, and helped to make his reputation in the field. The magazines ceased publication in late 1941, but Wollheim was able to find a publisher for one further issue of Stirring Science Stories in March 1942 before war restrictions forced it to close again.

Other well-known writers who appeared in the two magazines included Damon Knight and David H. Keller. Knight's first published story, "Resilience", appeared in the February 1941 issue of Stirring Stories, but the story was ruined by a misprint in a crucial word in the first sentence. Keller was an established writer in the field, but Wollheim was aware that Keller occasionally donated material to fanzines, and was able to obtain a story from him. The quality of the artwork was variable; it included Elliot Dold's last artwork in the science fiction field, for the cover of the July 1941 issue of Cosmic Stories, and several covers and interior drawings by Hannes Bok, who later became a well-known artist in the field.

== Publication history ==
	Jan	Feb	Mar	Apr	May	Jun	Jul	Aug	Sep	Oct	Nov	Dec
1941		1/1		1/2		1/3						
1942			2/1									
All four issues of Stirring Science Stories, showing volume and issue numbers. Donald A. Wollheim was editor throughout.

Although science fiction (sf) had been published in the United States before the 1920s, it did not begin to coalesce into a separately marketed genre until the appearance in 1926 of Amazing Stories, a pulp magazine published by Hugo Gernsback. By the end of the 1930s the field was booming, and between 1939 and 1941 a flood of new sf magazines appeared. In late 1940, Donald A. Wollheim, an active science fiction fan and aspiring editor and writer, noticed a new magazine titled Stirring Detective and Western Stories on the newsstands. He wrote to the publishers, Albing Publications, to see if they were interested in adding a science fiction title to their list, and he was invited to their office. Wollheim later recalled the meeting:

It was a father and son, the son in his twenties, and the father in his fifties; they were operating out of a desk in the corner of an advertising office, and what they had was credit from one of the news companies [distributors], Kable or one of those outfits, and they said, 'We don't have any capital, but if you can put the magazine together for nothing, we can go up to fifteen bucks for art, and we can do it. If the magazine succeeds, then we'll be able to pay you a regular salary after the third issue.' My attitude was that at least I'd be getting the experience, and something was better than nothing. (Note: The explanatory "[distributors]" was added by Damon Knight when he quoted this in The Futurians, his history of the fan group of the same name. Wollheim was not the only Futurian to come to this arrangement with Albing; Doris Baumgardt, who by that time was married to Frederik Pohl, edited Movie Love Stories for Albing, also with no budget for fiction, though Damon Knight's recollection is that she wrote most of the content herself and probably would not have done so without at least some payment.)

	Jan	Feb	Mar	Apr	May	Jun	Jul	Aug	Sep	Oct	Nov	Dec
1941			1/1		1/2		1/3					
All three issues of Cosmic Stories, showing volume and issue numbers. Donald A. Wollheim was editor throughout.

Wollheim sent a letter out to his contacts in science fiction fandom, announcing the new magazines. Originally the plan had been to publish a single monthly title, but this was changed by the publisher to two alternating bimonthly magazines, to be called Cosmic Stories and Stirring Science Stories. The first to appear was the February 1941 issue of Stirring Science Stories. Wollheim had announced a planned newsstand date of 15 December 1940, but according to Damon Knight's later recollection the magazine appeared in January 1941. The two titles alternated months until the July 1941 issue of Cosmic Stories (by that time retitled Cosmic Science-Fiction on the cover), after which the magazines were cancelled. Some months later Wollheim was able to find another publisher, Manhattan Fiction Publications, and a fourth issue of Stirring appeared, dated March 1942. Wartime constraints prevented the new publisher from continuing, and there were no more issues of either title.

An announcement in the January 1941 Writer's Digest listed the payment rate as half a cent per word. This was a low rate, but it would have been on a par with many other magazines of the era, had Wollheim been able to achieve it. (Note: For example, Frederik Pohl was paying half a cent per word at Super Science Stories and Astonishing Stories, and Charles Hornig was paying the same rate at Science Fiction for most of his acquisitions.) In the event he was able to start paying small amounts to his authors after the first couple of issues; Kornbluth was paid for several of his later stories for the two magazines, though the rates were well below half a cent per word.

== Contents and reception ==
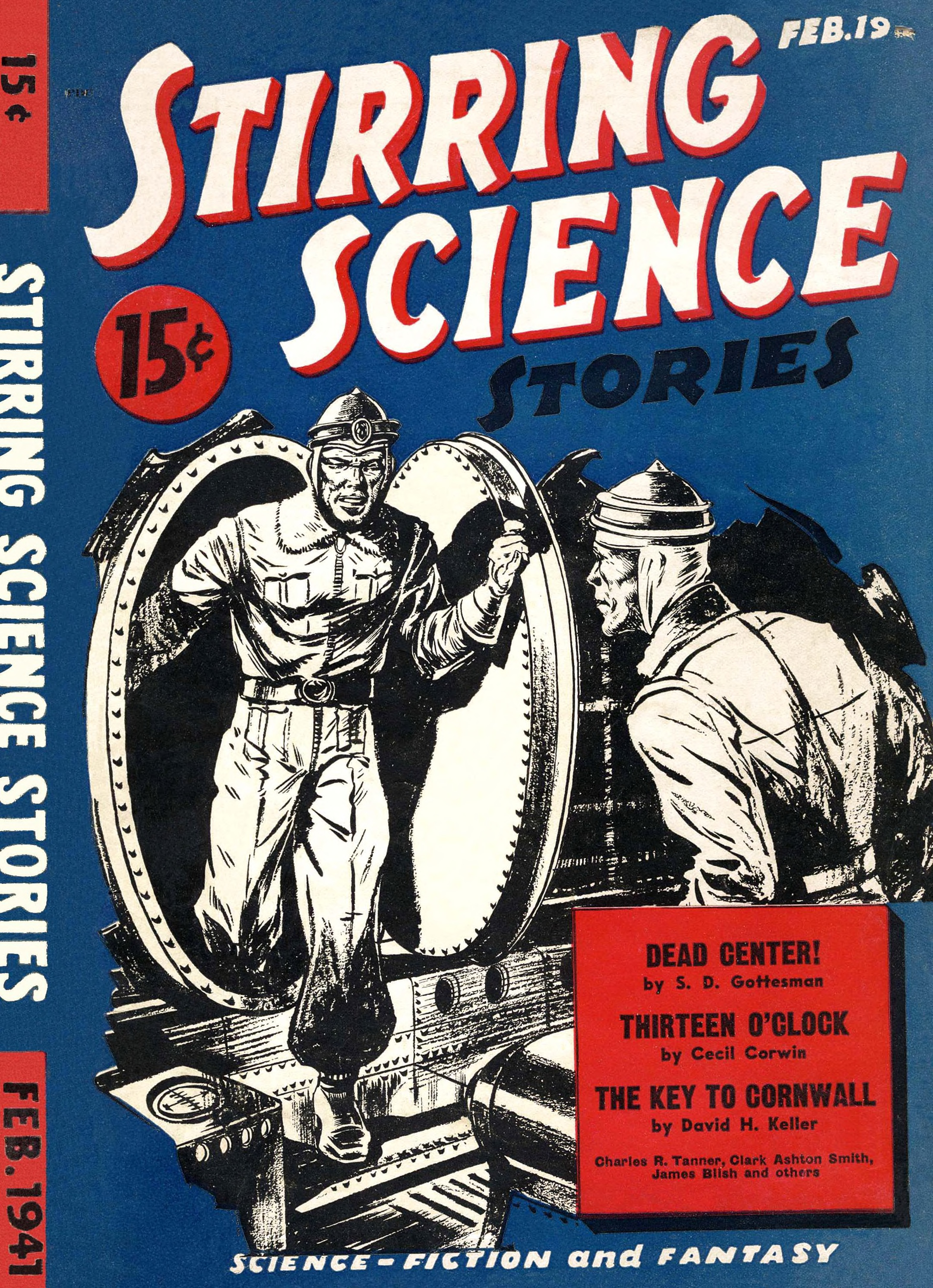
The first issue of Stirring Science Stories; cover art by Leo Morey

Stirring Science Stories was presented by Wollheim as if it were two separate magazines bound together; the first half of the magazine was titled "Stirring Science-Fiction", and the second half "Stirring Fantasy-Fiction". An editorial and letters section, titled "The Vortex", separated the two. Wollheim described his approach in the first issue, saying "Stirring Science Stories isn't really one magazine but two. A sort of Siamese twin embracing within its covers for the first time in publishing history a science fiction magazine and a weird-fantasy magazine".

Wollheim was a member of the Futurians, a group of New York science fiction fans, many of whom were also starting to be published writers. Some, including Isaac Asimov, Frederik Pohl, C. M. Kornbluth, and James Blish, were later to become very successful in the field. Robert A. W. Lowndes, another Futurian, took on the task of finding free material for Wollheim to fill the first two issues. Two of the Futurians (Lowndes and Pohl) were already working as editors of recently launched sf magazines, and there were many other paying markets for science fiction at that time, but the Futurians were so prolific that Wollheim was able to obtain much of his material from them. Wollheim also published some of his own stories in the two magazines. Kornbluth provided Wollheim with more stories than anyone else, using several aliases, including "Cecil Corwin", "S.D. Gottesman", and "Kenneth Falconer". Other Futurians who contributed material included Blish, Lowndes, Walter Kubilius, David Kyle, and John B. Michel; the stories, often collaborations between two or more of the Futurians, were published under a variety of pseudonyms. Damon Knight's first story, "Resilience", appeared in the February 1941 issue of Stirring with an unfortunate printer's error in the first sentence of the story that rendered the plot incomprehensible. (Note: The story was about indestructible aliens, who referred to humans as "Brittle People", by way of comparison with themselves. The printers dropped a tray of type and reconstructed the text from memory, and the rebuilt text changed the only occurrence of "Brittle People" to "Little People".) Knight would later become a member of the Futurians, but he was still living in Oregon at the time the story appeared in print.

"Thirteen O'Clock", by Kornbluth, is generally regarded as the best story in the first issue of Stirring; Knight describes it as "a delightful screwball fantasy", and adds that it made Kornbluth's reputation. Other stories from later issues that have been well-received include "The Long Wall", by Lowndes; "The City in the Sofa", "What Sorghum Says", "The Golden Road", and "The Words of Guru", all by Kornbluth; "The Real Thrill" by Blish; and "The Goblins Will Get You", by Michel.

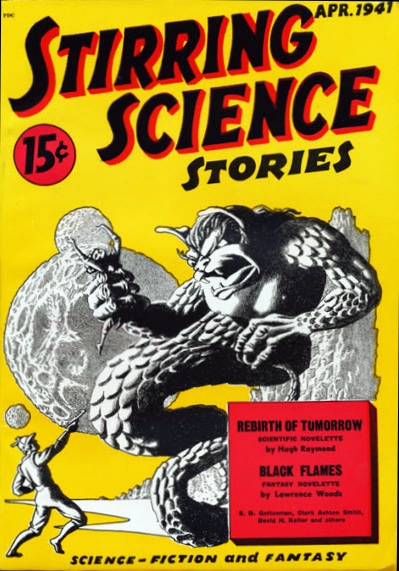
The April 1941 issue of Stirring Science Stories; cover art by Hannes Bok

Isaac Asimov contributed a story, "The Secret Sense", which appeared in the March 1941 issue of Cosmic. After Wollheim acquired the story, Asimov met with F. Orlin Tremaine, the editor of Comet—a competing science fiction magazine—and discovered that Tremaine was irate at the idea of a magazine that might "siphon readership from magazines that paid" by taking stories without paying the authors. Tremaine felt that any author who contributed a story to these magazines should be blacklisted. Asimov acknowledged that a story of his would be appearing in Cosmic, but told Tremaine that he had been paid for it. In Asimov's autobiographical anthology The Early Asimov he recalls that after hearing Tremaine's comments he requested a token payment of $5 from Wollheim; in Asimov's autobiography In Memory Yet Green the sequence of events is given slightly differently, with Asimov asking Wollheim for payment, or else for the story to be published under a pseudonym, before the story was published. This was requested on the grounds that "even though the story might be worth nothing, my name was worth something". Wollheim reluctantly agreed to a payment of $5, commenting that it was an effective word rate of $2.50 per word, since he was paying only for the use of Asimov's name. (Note: Asimov described the letter from Wollheim with the $5 payment as "needlessly nasty". He later commented to Damon Knight that he might have just given Wollheim the $5 back in cash after receiving the check, but that the option never occurred to him at the time.) Wollheim later commented that because of the payment he could sue Asimov for royalties whenever the latter's name appeared in print.

In contrast to Tremaine's attitude, John W. Campbell, the editor of the leading science fiction magazine, Astounding Science Fiction, was not concerned by Albing's policy. Campbell felt that any story that an author was willing to give away would be so poor that the new magazines would not be competitive. Although Campbell was correct that the magazine was unable to compete with paying magazines, Wollheim managed to produce, in Damon Knight's words, "a rather surprising level of quality".

As well as stories from the Futurians, Wollheim was able to obtain some material from established names in the field, including David H. Keller and Clark Ashton Smith. Keller occasionally gave material to fan magazines, and Wollheim would have been aware of this when he began looking for free stories.

Wollheim was fortunate in obtaining a good deal of artwork from Hannes Bok, later to become a popular artist in the field. Bok was enthusiastic enough about Kornbluth's "Thirteen O'Clock" to produce more interior drawings than Wollheim had room for in that issue; they were eventually used to advertise the magazine in later issues. For the February 1941 issue of Stirring Science Stories, the $15 art budget went to Leo Morey, an established artist. Morey's cover was undistinguished; Damon Knight commented later that the door to the airlock in the picture evidently did not fit, and that at $15 Morey was overpaid. Wollheim also obtained free art from Roy Hunt, an artist based in Denver. The cover for the July 1941 issue of Cosmic Stories was by Elliott Dold; Dold was at one time regarded as one of the most important sf artists, but this was the last work he did in the science fiction field. The cover has been described by sf historian Mark Rich as "excellent ... [it] accurately illustrates a scene" from "Interference", a story by Kornbluth published under the pseudonym "Walter C. Davies".

== Bibliographic details ==
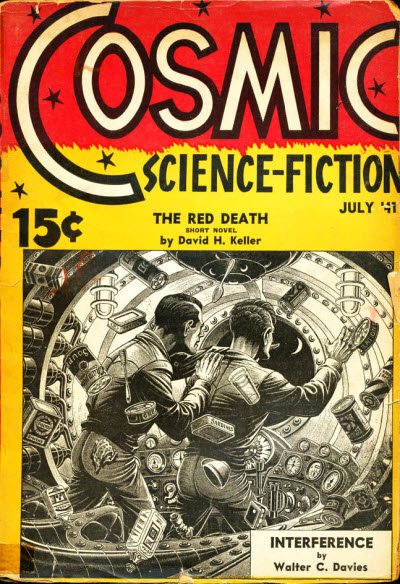
The July 1941 issue of Cosmic Stories; cover art by Elliott Dold

Donald A. Wollheim was the editor for all issues of both Cosmic Stories and Stirring Science Stories. Cosmic had a single volume of three numbers; Stirring also was numbered in volumes of three issues, but reached volume 2 number 1 with its last issue. Initially the two magazines appeared on an alternating bimonthly schedule, with Stirring's first issue appearing in February 1941 and Cosmic's first issue the following month; after three issues each there was a long delay before a final issue of Stirring appeared in March 1942. Cosmic was titled "Cosmic Science-Fiction" on the cover for the second and third issues, though it remained "Cosmic Stories" on the masthead. The publisher for all issues of Cosmic and the first three issues of Stirring was Albing Publications of New York; the final issue of Stirring was published by Manhattan Fiction Publications of New York. Both magazines were priced at 15 cents throughout. Stirring was pulp format and 128 pages long for the first three issues, and switched to large pulp format with 68 pages for the last issue. Cosmic was 130 pages for the first two issues, and 116 pages for the last issue; all were in pulp format.

== Sources ==
- Ashley, Mike (2000). The Time Machines: The Story of the Science-Fiction Pulp Magazines from the beginning to 1950. Liverpool: Liverpool University Press. ISBN 0-85323-865-0.
- Asimov, Isaac (1979). In Memory Yet Green: The Autobiography of Isaac Asimov, 1920–1954. New York: Doubleday. ISBN 0-385-13679-X.
- Edwards, Malcolm; Nicholls, Peter (1993). "SF magazines". In Clute, John; Nicholls, Peter (eds.). The Encyclopedia of Science Fiction. New York: St. Martin's Press, Inc. pp. 1066–1071. ISBN 0-312-09618-6.
- Knight, Damon (1977). The Futurians. New York: John Day.
- Pohl, Frederik (2002). "Damon Knight". In Pohl, Frederik (ed.). The SFWA Grand Masters: Volume 3. New York: Macmillan. pp. 201–203. ISBN 0-312-86877-4.
- Rocklynne, Ross (October 1941). "Science-Fiction Simplified". Writer's Digest. XXI (11): 25–30.
- Thompson, Raymond H. (1985a). "Cosmic Stories". In Tymn, Marshall B.; Ashley, Mike (eds.). Science Fiction, Fantasy, and Weird Fiction Magazines. Westport, Connecticut: Greenwood Press. pp. 168–170. ISBN 0-313-21221-X.
- Thompson, Raymond H. (1985b). "Stirring Science Stories". In Tymn, Marshall B.; Ashley, Mike (eds.). Science Fiction, Fantasy, and Weird Fiction Magazines. Westport, Connecticut: Greenwood Press. pp. 679–681. ISBN 0-313-21221-X.
- Weinberg, Robert (1988). A Biographical Dictionary of Science Fiction and Fantasy Artists. Westport, Connecticut: Greenwood Press. ISBN 0-313-24349-2.
