= Walter Kubilius =

American novelist (1918–1993)

- Born: November 22, 1918
- Died: September 22, 1993 (aged 74)
- Occupation: Writer
- Writing career
- Genre: Science fiction

Walter Kubilius (November 22, 1918 – September 22, 1993) was an American science fiction (short fiction) writer.

A member of the influential science fiction fandom club Futurians, his style was characterized as "pedestrian, out-at-the-elbows prose" by James Blish.

== Works ==
- December 1932: Letter (The Same as Earthians), in Wonder Stories
- June 1941: Trail's End, in Stirring Science Stories
- 1941. Caridi Shall Not Die!
- 1941. The Unusual Case
- 1942. Atrakin and the Man
- 1942. Galactic Ghost
- 1942. Parrots of Venus
- 1942. Remember Me, Kama!
- 1942. The Day Has Come
- 1942. Voice In The Void
- 1943. Journey's End
- 1944. A Handful of Stars
- 1951. Eternal Earthling
- 1951. The Gray Cloud
- 1951. The Other Side, reprinted in "Best Of" anthologies
- 1951. Turn Backward, O Time!
- 1951. Ultimate Purpose
- 1952. Go to the Ant
- 1952. Second Chance
- 1952. Solution Vital
- 1953. Secret Invasion
