= Herbert F. Stockdale =

Herbert Fitton Stockdale FRSE LLD (1865–1951) was a 19th/20th century British university administrator.

== Life ==
He was born in Ravensthorpe in Yorkshire on 13 January 1865 and educated in the Boothroyd School.

In 1889, at age 21, he became Assistant secretary at the College of Science in Newcastle-upon-Tyne (linked to Durham University), becoming Secretary in 1891. In 1899, he became Secretary and Treasurer to the Royal Technical College in Glasgow (later renamed Strathclyde University) where he rose ro be Director of the College in 1903. At this time he was living at "Clairinch" in Milngavie.

In 1902, he was elected a Fellow of the Royal Society of Edinburgh. His proposers were Magnus Maclean, Sir Francis Grant Ogilvie, Sir Robert Pullar and Frank Watson Young. In 1919 he was awarded an honorary doctorate (LLD) by Glasgow University.

By 1910, he had moved to Helensburgh, naming his home again Clairinch after his previous house.

In 1916, he wrote the obituary for Eugene Bourdon but his connection is unclear.

In 1923, he became a Member of the Royal Philosophical Society of Glasgow.

He retired in 1933, and died at home in Helensburgh on 28 December 1951 aged 86.

The Herbert Stockdale Papers now form part of the University of Strathclyde's collections.

== Family ==
In 1894, he married Helen Steven, daughter of Andrew Steven of Newcastle-upon-Tyne.

== Artistic portrayal ==
He was portrayed by Francis Henry Newbery around 1920.
