= Boudin (surname) =

Boudin is a surname. Notable people with the surname include:

A family of American legal figures and activists

- Louis B. Boudin (1874–1952), American Marxist intellectual and lawyer
- Leonard Boudin (1912–1989), American civil liberties lawyer (nephew of Louis B. Boudin)
  - Michael Boudin (1939–2025), American judge
  - Kathy Boudin (1943–2022), former Weather Underground member convicted of murder, and adjunct professor at Columbia University
    - Chesa Boudin (born 1980), American lawyer, former District Attorney of San Francisco

Others

- Clémence Boudin (born 2008), French ice hockey player
- Eugène Boudin (1824–1898), French landscape painter
- Isidore Boudin, founder of Boudin Bakery in San Francisco, California
- Stéphane Boudin (1888–1967), French interior designer

== See also ==
- Bodin (surname)
