= Comet (magazine) =

US pulp science fiction magazine

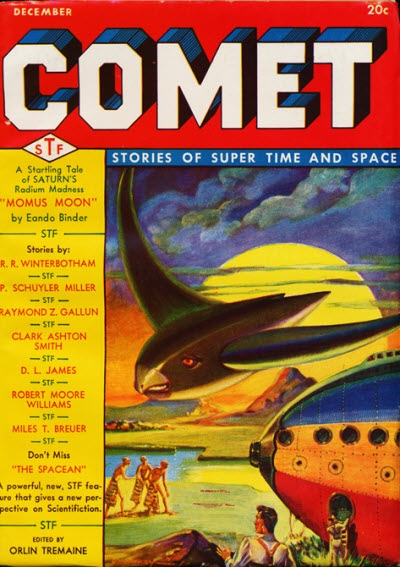
Cover of the first issue of Comet Stories, dated December 1940. Cover art is by Leo Morey.

Comet was a pulp magazine which published five issues from December 1940 to July 1941. It was edited by F. Orlin Tremaine, who had edited Astounding Stories, one of the leaders of the science fiction magazine field, for several years in the mid-1930s. Tremaine paid one cent per word, which was higher than some of the competing magazines, but the publisher, H-K Publications based in Springfield, MA, was unable to sustain the magazine while it gained circulation, and it was cancelled after less than a year when Tremaine resigned. Comet published fiction by several well-known and popular writers, including E.E. Smith and Robert Moore Williams. The young Isaac Asimov, visiting Tremaine in Comet's offices, was alarmed when Tremaine asserted that anyone who gave stories to competing magazines for no pay should be blacklisted; Asimov promptly insisted that Donald Wollheim, to whom he had given a free story, should make him a token payment so he could say he had been paid.

== Publication history ==
| | Jan | Feb | Mar | Apr | May | Jun | Jul | Aug | Sep | Oct | Nov | Dec |
|---|---|---|---|---|---|---|---|---|---|---|---|---|
| 1940 | | | | | | | | | | | | 1/1 |
| 1941 | 1/2 | | 1/3 | | 1/4 | | 1/5 | | | | | |
All five issues of Comet, showing volume and issue numbers. Tremaine was editor throughout.

Although science fiction (SF) had been published before the 1920s, it did not begin to coalesce into a separately marketed genre until the appearance in 1926 of Amazing Stories, a pulp magazine published by Hugo Gernsback. By the end of the 1930s the field was booming. At the end of 1940 H-K Publications, a small New York publishing operation owned by Harold Hersey, decided to launch a new SF magazine, titled Comet. The first issue was dated December 1940. The editor was F. Orlin Tremaine, who was well known to and respected by the growing readership of science fiction because of his successful stint as editor of Astounding Stories in the early 1930s. (Note: Sf historian Everett F. Bleiler gives the publisher as "Orlin Tremaine Company", and says it was owned by Tremaine, so appears that H-K Publications was an imprint of Tremaine's company.)

Tremaine paid a cent a word for stories, which was more than many of the other SF magazines that were crowding the field at the time; the respectable pay rate no doubt helped him, but it put the magazine under additional financial pressure. Two other magazines launched at about the same time, Cosmic Stories and Stirring Science Stories, edited by Donald A. Wollheim, both paid nothing at all to writers, on the basis that if the magazines were successful, money might be available in the future. This annoyed Tremaine, and Isaac Asimov, who gave Wollheim a story for Cosmic Stories, later recalled Tremaine telling him that "any author who donated stories to Wollheim, and thus contributed to the destruction of competing magazines who paid, should be blacklisted in the field". Asimov was sufficiently upset that he later obtained token payment from Wollheim so that he could assert he had been paid for his story.

== Contents ==
Tremaine was able to acquire some worthwhile material, and the magazine showed improvement over its five issues. Among the better-known stories Tremaine obtained was "Vortex Blaster", by E.E. Smith; this was the first in a series about Storm Cloud, later collected in book form. Other well-received stories included "The Street That Wasn't There", by Clifford D. Simak and Carl Jacobi, and "Dark Reality", by Robert Moore Williams. Sam Moskowitz, later a well-known SF critic and historian, published some science fiction stories early in his career; his first sale was to Tremaine, with "The Way Back", which appeared in the January 1941 issue of Comet. There was also a "Short, Short Story Corner" which was targeted at new writers, though established authors were also asked to submit very short stories for this feature. Another competition, this time aimed at fans rather than writers, offered a prize of $25 to the fan who had to overcame the most difficulties in order to attend the 1941 World Science Fiction Convention in Denver.

The Futurians, a group of New York science fiction fans many of whom would later go on to become well-known SF writers, often produced stories that were the result of collaborations between four, five, or even more of their members. One example, "The Psychological Regulator" was originally written by Wollheim. It was rejected by Tremaine and rewritten, first by Robert A.W. Lowndes, then by John Michel, and then by Elsie Balter, with Tremaine rejecting it again after each rewrite. Finally C.M. Kornbluth rewrote it and Tremaine accepted the story, publishing it in the March 1941 issue of Comet.

== Bibliographic details ==
Comet was printed in pulp format, 128 pages, and was priced at 20 cents; all five issues were edited by Tremaine. There was one volume of five issues; the first four were subtitled "Stories of Super Time and Space". The schedule was initially monthly, but switched to bimonthly after the first issue. There were no overseas reprint editions or anthologies of stories from the magazine.

== Sources ==
- Bleiler, Everett F.; Bleiler, Richard J. (1998). Science-Fiction: The Gernsback Years. Westport CT: Kent State University Press. p. 434. ISBN 0-87338-604-3.
- Bleiler, Richard (1991). The Annotated Index to The Thrill Book. Mercer Island WA: Starmont House, Inc. ISBN 1-55742-205-2. ISSN 0738-0127.
- Edwards, Malcolm; Nicholls, Peter (1993). "SF magazines". In Clute, John; Nicholls, Peter (eds.). The Encyclopedia of Science Fiction. New York: St. Martin's Press, Inc. pp. 1066–1071. ISBN 0-312-09618-6.
- Pohl, Frederik (1976). The Early Pohl. New York: Dobson. ISBN 0-234-72198-7.
- Rich, Mark (2010). C.M. Kornbluth: The Life and Works of a Science Fiction Visionary. Jefferson NC: McFarland & Company, Inc. ISBN 978-0-312-09618-2.
- Sanders, Joseph (1986). E.E. "Doc" Smith. Wildside Press. ISBN 0-916732-72-X.
- Sanders, Joseph (1994). Science Fiction Fandom. Westport CT: Greenwood Press. ISBN 0-313-23380-2.
- Thompson, Raymond H. (1985a). "Comet". In Tymn, Marshall B.; Ashley, Mike (eds.). Science Fiction, Fantasy, and Weird Fiction Magazines. Westport CT: Greenwood Press. pp. 163–166. ISBN 0-313-21221-X.
- Thompson, Raymond H. (1985b). "Stirring Science Stories". In Tymn, Marshall B.; Ashley, Mike (eds.). Science Fiction, Fantasy, and Weird Fiction Magazines. Westport CT: Greenwood Press. pp. 617–620. ISBN 0-313-21221-X.
