= Bodin (surname) =

Bodin is a surname. Notable people with the surname include:

- Astrid Bodin (1903–1961), Swedish actress
- Billy Bodin (born 1992), Welsh football player
- Chris Douglas (musician) (born 1974), also known as "Wooli Bodin", American musician
- Claude Bodin (born 1952), member of the National Assembly of France
- Constantine Bodin (fl. 1081–1101), medieval ruler
- Don Bodin, American composer, songwriter, and music producer
- Paul-Joseph Bodin (1847– 1926), French engineer
- Edward Longstreet Bodin (1894–1983), American mystery writer and founder of the "Spiritual Party"
- Étienne Soulange-Bodin (1774–1846), French agronomist and army officer
- Geneviève Bodin (1923–2021), better known as Geneviève Asse, Breton painter and engraver
- Jean Bodin (1530–1596), 16th-century French jurist and political philosopher
- Joseph Bodin de Boismortier (1689–1755), French baroque composer
- Kévin Bodin (born 1987), French football player
- Lars Gunnar Bodin (1935–2021), Swedish electronic music pioneer
- Leif Bodin (born 1996), German politician
- Martin Bodin (1903–1976), Swedish cinematographer
- Paul Bodin (born 1964), Welsh football player and coach
- Simone Micheline Bodin (1925–2015), French fashion model
- Tomas Bodin, Swedish keyboard player
- Yannick Bodin (born 1942), member of the Senate of France

== See also ==
- Bodin Municipality, a former municipality in Nordland county, Norway
- Bolden (name), given name and surname
- Boldin, surname
