= Boldin =

Boldin is a surname. Notable people with the surname include:

- Anquan Boldin (born 1980), American football player
- DJ Boldin (born 1986), American football coach and former player
- Igor Boldin (born 1964), Russian ice hockey player
- Ivan Boldin (1892–1965), Soviet army-officer in World War II
- Valery Boldin (1935–2006), Soviet politician

== See also ==
- Bodin (surname)
- Bolden (name), given name and surname
