= The Secret Sense =

Short story by Isaac Asimov

- Short story by Isaac Asimov
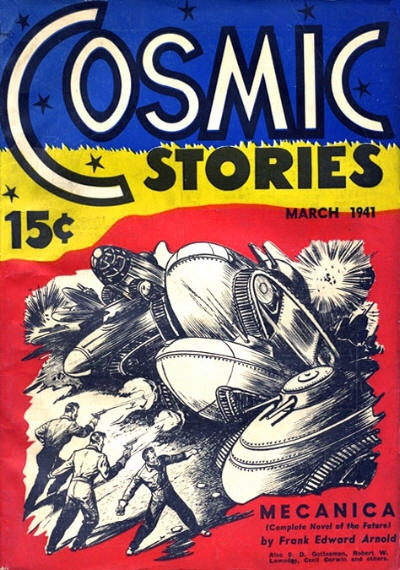
- Country: United States
- Language: English
- Genre: Science fiction

Publication
- Published in: Cosmic Stories
- Publication type: Periodical
- Publisher: Albing Publications
- Media type: Print (Magazine, Hardback & Paperback)
- Publication date: March 1941

Chronology
—	Homo Sol

"The Secret Sense" is a science fiction short story by American writer Isaac Asimov, published in Cosmic Stories in March 1941. It takes place against the background of an ancient and highly developed culture living in large underground cities on Mars.

== Publication ==
Asimov wrote the story in 1939 and submitted to the magazine Astounding SF, but was rejected by its editor John W. Campbell, Jr. It could not be placed by Asimov's agent, Frederik Pohl, and eventually it was taken for no payment by a new and short-lived magazine, Cosmic Stories, in March 1941, although Asimov did ask for a token payment of $5 from the editor, Donald A. Wollheim, or else for the story to be published under a pseudonym, before the story was published. This was requested on the grounds that "even though the story might be worth nothing, my name was worth something". Wollheim reluctantly agreed to a payment of $5, commenting that it was an effective word rate of $2.50 per word, since he was paying only for the use of Asimov's name. Asimov described the letter from Wollheim with the $5 payment as "needlessly nasty". He later commented to Damon Knight that he might have just given Wollheim the $5 back in cash after receiving the check, but that the option never occurred to him at the time. The story was reprinted in the collection The Early Asimov in 1972.

== Plot summary ==
Lincoln Fields, a rich Earthling from New York City living on Mars, is discussing the merits of the highly developed sense of sight and hearing that humans possess, which the Martians do not. Garth Jan, his Martian friend, counters with the merits of the senses that the Martians possess, and unintentionally lets slip that there is also one secret sense. Fields asks him to give it to him but Garth Jan refuses at that time. Six months later, using Martian social law in an unethical fashion, Fields forces him to let him feel this sense and Jan reluctantly agrees.

Fields is injected by a Martian physician with a hormone extract that will activate the sense in him, but only for five minutes, after which it will be unusable ever again. Jan's music teacher commences playing a musical composition on a Martian instrument, the portwem.

After a few minutes, Fields starts to experience the wonders of the portwem, first with colours and sounds and odours all directly affecting the senses, which transition into a new, indescribable sense. He is devastated, as Jan knew he would be, when his time is up and he loses the ability to experience the secret sense.
