= Bolden (name) =

Bolden is a given name and surname. Notable people with the name include:

== Given name ==
- Bolden Brace (born 1997), American basketball player
- Bolden Reush Harrison (1886–1952), U.S. Navy seaman

== Surname ==
- Abraham Bolden, a former United States Secret Service agent
- Bess Bolden Walcott (1886–1988), African American educator, librarian, curator and activist
- Brandon Bolden (born 1990), American football player
- Bruce Bolden (born 1966), American former basketball player in Australia
- Bubba Bolden (born 2000), American football player
- Buddy Bolden (1877–1931), American jazz musician
- Charles Bolden (born 1946), American pilot, astronaut, and NASA Administrator
- DeCorsey E. Bolden (1924–2016), American politician and businessman from Maryland
- Elizabeth Bolden (1890–2006), American supercentenarian
- Isaiah Bolden (born 1999), American football player
- Jonah Bolden (born 1996), Australian basketball player
- KJ Bolden (born 2006), American football player
- Kyra Harris Bolden (born 1988), American politician
- Marques Bolden (born 1998), American-born Indonesian basketball player
- Omar Bolden (born 1988), American football player
- Sarina Bolden (born 1996), Filipino football player
- Silas Bolden (born 2001), American football player
- Slade Bolden (born 1999), American football player
- Tonya Bolden (born 1959), American author

== See also ==
- Boldin, a surname
- Bodin (surname)
