= Dot cancellation test =

Visual perception and vigilance test

- Synonyms: Bourdon-Wiersma test
- Purpose: test visual perception

The dot cancellation test or Bourdon–Wiersma test is a commonly used test of combined visual perception and vigilance.

The test has been used in the evaluation of stroke where subjects were instructed to cross out all groups of four dots on an A4 paper. The numbers of uncrossed groups of four dots, groups of dots other than four crossed, and the time spent (maximum, 15 minutes) were taken into account. The Group–Bourdon test, a modification of the Bourdon–Wiersma, is one of a number of psychometric tests which trainee train drivers in the UK are required to pass.

The test is based on the work of French psychologist Benjamin B. Bourdon (1860–1943) and Dutch neurologist Enno Dirk Wiersma (1858–1940).
