= F. Orlin Tremaine =

American magazine editor (1899–1956)

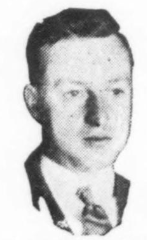
- Born: Frederick Orlin Meters; January 7, 1899
- Died: October 22, 1956 (aged 57); Glens Falls, New York, U.S.
- Education: Valparaiso University
- Occupations: Book and magazine publisher, editor, author
- Known for: Editor of Astounding Stories

Frederick Orlin Tremaine (January 7, 1899 – October 22, 1956) was an American science fiction magazine editor, most notably of the influential Astounding Stories. He edited a number of other magazines, headed several publishing companies, and sporadically wrote fiction.

== Biography ==
Frederick Orlin Tremaine was born into an old Cornish American family on January 7, 1899, in Harrisville, New York. He had two brothers, DeWitt Carlton (1900–65) and Nelson Dowd Tremaine (1907–71), and one sister, Alice Leila M. Tremaine (1912–1998).

He was a veteran of World War I.

In 1921, he graduated with a B.O. degree from the College of Arts and Sciences, Valparaiso University, Indiana. At Valparaiso, he was active in his fraternity, participated in drama, and worked on the weekly school newspaper, The Torch.

In 1932, he married Vera Evangeline Kurtz (1905–92). They were no longer together by 1940.

He was a member of the Mystery Writers of America, the Washington (D.C.) Press Club and of the Sons of the American Revolution.

He died at Westmount Sanatorium, Glen Falls, New York, after a long illness, age 57, survived by two brothers and a sister.

== Writing, editing, and publishing career ==
During his junior year at Valparaiso, in the spring term, 1920, Tremaine was News Editor of the weekly school newspaper, The Torch. He served as Editor-in-Chief during his senior year of 1920–21.

His first job, post-graduation, was on the staff of a New York City newspaper. In late 1922, he was associate editor for The Eastern Underwriter in NYC.

He moved on to the Macfadden magazine conglomerate. In May 1923, he was the managing editor of Macfadden's Brain Power and Beautiful Womanhood. On June 1, 1923, he became editor of the prestigious Metropolitan Magazine (retitled Macfadden Fiction-Lover's Magazine for the October 1924 issue). In early 1924, he became editor of the flagship title True Story Magazine. He also claimed credit for laying out the first issues of True Romances, True Detective, and True Experiences. Tremaine later credited John R. Coryell as a strong influence: "Coryell, approaching eighty of years of age, was fiction or story editor of the Macfadden Publications a quarter of a century ago when I first became an editor of a national magazine, and he taught me more about stories, simplicity of approach, and the technique of modern writing than any other person, before or since."

Later in 1924, he departed to become editor of The Smart Set, a tenure that lasted until mid-1926.

A sporadic fiction writer, his first known published story, One Burning Minute, received serialized newspaper syndication in August–October, 1926. Soon after, his first known pulp story, "The Throwback," appeared in Weird Tales (October 1926) under the pseudonym Orlin Frederick.

In 1927, Tremaine become president of a trust that attempted to take control of the Phelps Publishing Company, publisher of New England Homestead and other magazines. The deal collapsed when financing fell through. Tremaine rebounded with another group in incorporating the Crossroads Publishing Company. A year later, he was involved in yet another publishing enterprise, the Perennial Publishing Company.

In early 1928, he was slated to be editor of a new Christian magazine, Crossroads. No issues are known of.

Later in 1929, he joined the Clayton pulp publishing chain. He edited Miss 1929, soon renamed Miss 1930. After four issues, Miss 1930 was sold to Tremaine's Perennial Publishing Company, presumably part of Tremaine's departure from Clayton. Tremaine intended to continue editing Miss 1930, but there are no known issues for Perennial.

In late 1931, Alfred A. Cohen, publisher of Screenland and Silver Screen, purchased Everybody's Magazine from Butterick and attempted to revive it with Tremaine as editor. No known issues were produced and the magazine was soon declared discontinued.

Tremaine returned to Clayton, editing the humor magazine Bunk (late 1932), and My Love Story Magazine (and its retitling Love Classic Magazine) (late 1932 to early 1933). At one point, Tremaine was Clayton's editor-in-chief, but it's unclear when.

In 1933, Clayton went bankrupt and some of its assets were purchased by publisher Street & Smith. Tremaine joined Street & Smith, initially to edit three of the former Clayton titles: Astounding Stories (assisted by Desmond Hall, another Clayton transfer), Clues, and Cowboy Stories. At his peak, Tremaine was responsible for seven Street & Smith pulps:

- October 1933 (2 titles): Astounding Stories, Clues
- November 1933 (3): added Cowboy Stories
- December 1933 (4): added Top-Notch Magazine
- March 1935 (5): added Bill Barnes, Air Adventurer [retitled Bill Barnes Air Trails (October 1935), then Air Trails (February 1937)]
- October 1935 (6): added Dynamic Adventures
- November 1935 (7): added Romance Range (retitled Romantic Range after 5 issues)
- June 1936 (6): last issue of Dynamic Adventures
- mid-1937 (5): last edited issue of Clues
- September 1937 (3): last edited issues of Astounding and Top-Notch
- December 1937 (2): last edited issue of Cowboy Stories
- late 1937 (0): last edited issues of Air Trails and Romantic Range

Tremaine and Desmond Hall founded Street & Smith's slick Mademoiselle in 1935. Hall was the listed editor.

In the December 1933 issue of Astounding, Tremaine's third as editor, his editorial "Thought Variant" encouraged contributing authors to seek new ideas for science fiction stories. According to Alva Rogers, "the thought variant policy was largely responsible for the rapid rise of Astounding to top position in the science fiction field." During the fifty issues of the magazine he edited, Tremaine launched the careers of authors L. Sprague de Camp, Eric Frank Russell, and others. He also published stories by his brother Nelson under the pseudonym Warner van Lorne; van Lorne's true identity was a matter of intense speculation in fandom.

As editor of Astounding, Tremaine bought such stories as H.P. Lovecraft's At the Mountains of Madness (sold by Julius Schwartz) and The Shadow Out of Time (sold by Donald Wandrei), apparently without reading them. Tremaine permitted both tales to be severely abridged and edited by copyeditors, although Lovecraft complained vociferously only about the former (it was on this occasion that he referred to Tremaine as "that god-damnn'd dung of a hyaena" (Lovecraft to Robert H. Barlow, June 4, 1936 (ms, John Hay Library)).

In late 1937, Tremaine hired John W. Campbell, Jr. to replace him as editor of Astounding, while Tremaine was appointed editorial director of Street & Smith, a position he held for a year before departing Street & Smith during a management shake-up.

From early 1939 through at least 1941, he ran his own New York book publishing company, the Orlin Tremaine Company. (See separate listing of publications below.) On June 23, 1941, an associate editor of the firm, William M. Gibson, was convicted of extortion. He and Prince Ludovic Pignatelli of Italy had threatened the prince's cousin, Prince Guido Pignatelli, with publishing a book that would challenge Guido's right to his title unless they were paid $50,000. The timing roughly corresponds with the last-known publications of the Orlin Tremaine Co., but it is unknown whether the two events are related.

Simultaneous to his publishing ventures, Tremaine produced the science fiction pulp Comet, which ran five issues from December 1940 to July 1941. Also, from late 1939 through early 1940, Tremaine published four stories in pulps as diverse as Thrilling Wonder Stories and South Sea Stories.

During World War II, Tremaine edited Magazine Plus, distributed to war industries, and edited government manuals for the armed forces. In 1943, he was business manager for the revived children's magazine St. Nicholas; it only lasted four issues. Thereafter, Tremaine had his most productive period as a fiction writer, contributing numerous stories to detective pulps (1944–45). A series for Detective Tales featured a character named Easy Bart.

When the war ended, Tremaine became an editor for Bartholomew House, which published the first paperback editions of Lovecraft, The Weird Shadow Over Innsmouth (1944) and The Dunwich Horror (1945). He also published a revision of T. C. McClary's novel Rebirth (first appearance in Astounding Stories) while at Bartholomew House. In less than a year, he was describing himself as a "free lance writer." The current record does not indicate much success as a writer. His next known publications appeared in late 1948 and early 1949.

In 1949, he became editor of a new magazine, Southerner, and published a book, Short Story Writing. He claimed, at this time, to have published over one hundred stories.

In May 1950, Tremaine described himself as the managing editor of Macfadden Publications.

In the early 1950s, under the name Arthur Lane, Tremaine was an editorial associate for the pulp Marvel Science Stories.

His greatest success appears to have been with Street & Smith, and his most lasting contribution his editorship of Astounding. The rest of his career illustrates the vicissitudes of the publishing business.

== Bibliography ==
=== Published fiction ===
- One Burning Minute, newspaper serial, King Features Syndicate (August–October 1926)
- "The Throwback," Weird Tales (October 1926)
- "Pigeon Street," Fire Fighters (April 1929)
- "The Upper Level Road," Astounding Stories (August 1935)
- "Marinorro," Astounding Stories (November 1937)
- "Ormoly of Roonerion," Astounding Stories (January 1938)
- "Vibratory," Astounding Stories (March 1938)
- "Resilient Planet," Astounding Stories (August 1938)
- "Wanted—7 Fearless Engineers!," Amazing Stories (February 1939)
- "Golden Girl of Kalendar," Fantastic Adventures (September 1939)
- "True Confession," Thrilling Wonder Stories (February 1940)
- "Vengeance of Loana," South Sea Stories (February 1940)
- "Jalu of Radiant Valley," Fantastic Adventures (March 1940)
- "A Leader for Korcin," Future Fantasy and Science Fiction (December 1942)
- "The Expendable Spy," Detective Tales (January 1944) [an Easy Bart story]
- "The Dagger from Singapore," New Detective Magazine (May 1944)
- "The Silent Scalpel Murders," Detective Tales (February 1945) [an Easy Bart story]
- "Son of the Stars," Super Science Stories (April 1949)

=== Published nonfiction ===
- Short Story Writing (Emmaus, PA: Rodale Press, 1949)

=== Books published by the Orlin Tremaine Company ===
[publication date in parentheses; category in brackets]

- Arthur J. Burks (uncredited co-authorship with Tremaine), Who Do You Think You Are? (December 1939) [psychology]
- Sander Ariza, Trujillo: The Man and His Country (1939) [biography]
- Colonel Benjamin A. Franklin, Banners in the Wind (January 2, 1940) [inspirational]
- Frank W. Kravigny, The Jungle Route (March 1, 1940) [true adventure]
- Bob Carter, Little Things That Linger (June 1940) [potpourri from radio host]
- Ed Bodin, Scare Me! A Symposium on Ghosts and Black Magic by Ed Bodin, Collector of Mystic Facts, and Descendant of Jean Bodin, Famous Mystic Writer of the XVIth Century (June 1940) [occult]
- William Merriam Rouse, Bildad Road (July 1940) [novel]
- William Richard Twiford, Sown in the Darkness A.D. 2000 (January 1941) [science fiction novel]
- Horace J. Haase, The Economic Democracy (January 1941) [economics]
- Louis Leon DeJean, Royalty Road (November 1941) [short story writing guide]
