= Yannick Bodin =

French politician (1942–2023)

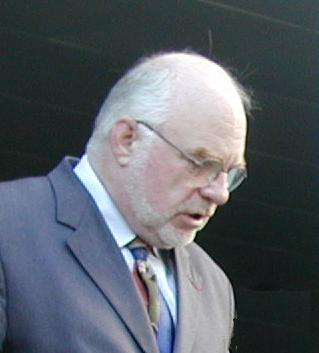
- Bodin in 2001

Member of the Senate of France
- In office 26 September 2004 – 30 September 2011

Personal details
- Born: 8 August 1942; Dinan, Côtes-d'Armor, German-occupied France
- Died: 8 October 2023 (aged 81)
- Political party: Socialist Party

Yannick Bodin (8 August 1942 – 8 October 2023) was a French politician who was a member of the Senate, representing the Seine-et-Marne department. He was a member of the Socialist Party.

Bodin died on 8 October 2023, at the age of 81.
