= Boudon =

Boudon is a French surname. Notable people with the surname include:

- Henri Boudon (1624–1702), French Roman Catholic priest and writer
- Louis Boudon (born 1998), French ice hockey player
- Raymond Boudon (1934–2013), French sociologist, philosopher, and academic
