= Ed Bodin =

American mystery writer, spiritualist, politician

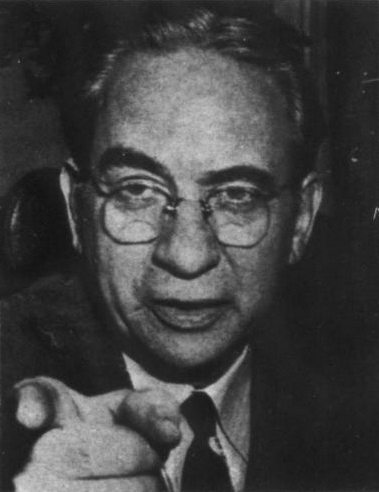
- Bodin in the 50s

Personal details
- Born: Edward Longstreet Bodin; August 5, 1894 Watchung, New Jersey, United States
- Died: August 2, 1983 (aged 88) Erie, Pennsylvania, United States
- Party: Spiritual Party

Edward Longstreet Bodin (August 5, 1894 – August 2, 1983), better known as Ed Bodin, was an American literary agent, columnist, mystery writer, and politician who founded the Spiritual Party as a platform to run for President of the United States in the 1952 presidential election.

== Biography ==
Born in Watchung, New Jersey, not much is known about Bodin's early life or family. His father was a former Sussex County judge, and he claimed to be family friends with Woodrow Wilson, a man who had a profound impact on his life.

Bodin attended the University of Pennsylvania, and afterwards became a newspaper reporter.

Bodin served in France during WWI. He met his French wife Juliette in Toulon. They were married on June 24, 1919.

After the war, Bodin worked for the Crowell Publishing Company for eleven years. He became a literary agent in 1931.

In 1932, Bodin began his writing career with the weekly column The Manuscript Man in The Birmingham News (Alabama), which provided news and tips on the New York freelance writing market. The column ran until 1947.

Bodin wrote for Strange Stories magazine as "Lucifer" and Thrilling Mystery magazine as "Chakra". In the 1930s, he served as a literary agent and mentor to L. Ron Hubbard.

In 1953, he suggested that if Winston Churchill doublecrossed the United States, the atom bomb should be used to divert the Gulf Stream in order to freeze England. He suggested the same thing two years later in Upper Purgatory, claiming to have received a letter from William E. Bergin, Adjutant General of the United States, treating the idea seriously (pages 17–18).

In 1949, Bodin was treasurer of the Bernarr Macfadden Foundation, and managing editor of Macfadden's Physical Culture magazine. In 1956, Bodin was the president of the foundation, worth about $5,000,000. That year he also provided the foreword to a book by Blanche A. Draper, the pastor of the Church of the Radiant Flame, a woman who worked as a psychic and medium.

In the late 1950s, Bodin wrote a monthly column for the metaphysical publication Orion Magazine.

He died in Erie, Pennsylvania, at age 88.

== Literary career ==
=== Scare Me! ===
In 1940, Bodin began writing books, starting with Scare Me! In the book, he addressed ghosts, ectoplasm, demons, zombies, werewolves and other similar topics, as well as claiming to be a descendant of Jean Bodin. In it, he thanked sixty-eight people, including Arthur J. Burks, Jack Dempsey, Ruth Lyons, Lowell Thomas, Nathaniel Schachner, Theodore Tinsley, F. Orlin Tremaine, Arthur Leo Zagat, William B. Ziff and L. Ron Hubbard.

=== Give Me Liberty ===
In 1946, Bodin published Give Me Liberty, a collection of poems framed as a dialogue between Bodin and his mentor, "Old Vagabond" in a sort of Socratic dialogue. Old Vagabond serves as a vector for Bodin to express his views, where he derides those who seek conflict based on class or race, champions both Robert E. Lee and Abraham Lincoln as true American heroes, and calls for a universal religious brotherhood regardless of faith. Old Vagabond frequently brings up the virtues of being a vagabond, extoling that Cain was the first vagabond, and although Tubalcain promoted brotherhood, Cain was not brought back into good until Christ, a vagabond as well, died on the cross. Old Vagabond consistently writes from a populist angle, decrying all forms of aristocracy as well as those who would use democracy as a farce. However, he also strikes at liberals who would sacrifice their nation or faith for politics, as a good vagabond is patriotic.

The figure of the vagabond is central to Give Me Liberty, and all good values are extolled as ones a "true vagabond" holds. Among these is the idea that your name should be short, hence why he went as Ed and not Edward.

=== Upper Purgatory ===
His 1955 novel Upper Purgatory covered such subjects as ESP, flying saucers, the afterlife, and the Shakespeare authorship question. In the book (which Bodin claims to be a non-fictional work), Bodin is present to a series of seances held by a WW2 veteran for his friend who perished in the conflict. During them, the ghost of the departed soldier imparts knowledge beyond average comprehension, such as the true number of planets being 12, with the first named Vulco. Bodin also mentions the death of FDR, calling it tragic.

== Bibliography ==
- "My Ghost Is Me!," Psychology Magazine, May 1936.
- Scare me!: A symposium on ghosts and black magic (1940)
- "These Sensitive Writers" in Author & Journalist (May 1945), reprinted in Pulp Fictioneers: Adventures in the Storytelling Business edited by John Locke.
- Give Me Liberty (1946) (as Ed "Vagabond" Bodin)
- Spirit World magazine (1947-) (editor)
- First Century Faith (Be Thou Healed): For Health and Happy Home of Christian, Jew or Pagan Better Books, New York, (1951)
- Upper Purgatory: A Fascinating Adventure in Extra Sensory Perception College Publishing Co., Daytona Beach, Florida (1955)
- The Radiant Flame by Blanche A. Draper College Publishing Co., Daytona Beach, Florida (1956) (foreword)
- "My Best Friends Are Ghosts" in Orion Magazine (March 1960)
- "Mystics Saint John, Daniel and Nostradamus" in Orion Magazine (February 1961)
- First century healing: (in your own home circle) (1962)
- Mystery History (1964)
