= Eugene Bourdon (architect) =

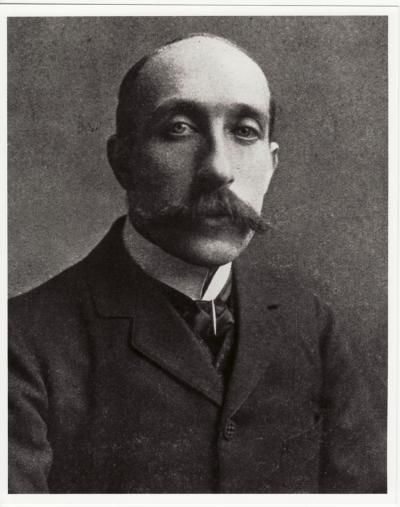
Black and white photograph portrait of Professor Eugene Bourdon from the Archives and Collections of the Glasgow School of Art

Eugene Bourdon (16 July 1870 – 1 July 1916) was a Professor of Architectural Design at the Glasgow School of Art, and was influential in the development of architectural thinking and education in Glasgow in the early 20th century.

== Early life and education ==
Bourdon was born in Paris on 16 July 1870. He was educated at the Condorcet Lycee, and received his Bachelier-des-lettres in 1888. Following this, he studied at the Ecole des Beaux-Arts in Paris as a pupil of the Atelier Daumet where he obtained the Diploma (ADFG). While at the Ecole he obtained medals in Architecture Decoration and Drawing, culminating in a medal at the 1896 salon.

== Work and influence ==
Following graduation, he went to work for the French Government as an inspector for the Exposition Universelle of 1900. A collection of photographs taken by Bourdon around this time show architectural exteriors and interiors of churches and other historical buildings in Italy and France. Back of photographs have stamp "Eugene Bourdon, Architecte, Diplome par le Gouvernement". Around this time he worked on the Grand Palais for Charles Girault.

In 1900 Bourdon travelled to New York working there on the elevations and interiors of a skyscraper but information on whom this was for and what else he actually designed is lacking. He returned to France where he found work as an assistant to Professor J L Pascal. Professor Pascal was invited to Glasgow by the Governors of the Glasgow School of Art and asked to report on architectural education in the city. Professor Pascal was unable to travel but sent in his place his assistant, Bourdon. Bourdon made his report, suggested minor modifications of the curriculum, and also recommend the appointment of a French-trained professor to head the new department of architecture. Asked if he himself was available Bourdon agreed to accept the post of Professor of Architectural Design in 1904. Between 1906 and 1910 Andrew Graham Henderson worked as his assistant.

Bourdon wrote that "the Beaux Arts system of architectural education consists of giving the foremost place to the Study of Design. It is assumed, as a matter of course, that the architect must have a complete training as a practical builder and as a man of business, and that he must be a man of education in a word, he must be a professional man. But these qualities, though necessary, are not sufficient to make an architect that is, an artist. Design is the proper function of the architect, and the training of young architects to design is the most important duty of architectural educators."

Bourdon introduced the Beaux-Arts architecture style to Scotland building on what might be argued to be a strong commitment to classicism in Glasgow. His teaching had a considerable effect on Glasgow architecture in the 1920s and 1930s. Of him Professor W J Smith wrote that he was 'a brilliant teacher' and 'as a gentleman of France his elegance and broken English fascinated us. He was patient, conscientious and considerate, but not with a design he didn't like or with a student who didn't work. He had a happy nature and was largely instrumental in founding the School of Architecture Club to provide for the lighter side of life'. Bourdon promoted "steel-framed Classical buildings of the American type".

Bourdon rejoined the French army for several weeks' service each summer. He obtained leave of absence to become a regular soldier in the French army when war was declared, reaching the rank of staff captain in the 78th Brigade. He was twice mentioned in Army Orders and was awarded the Croix de la Legion d'Honneur, the Croix de Guerre and the British Military Cross. He was killed at the Battle of the Somme on the evening of 1 July 1916, before a recommendation for the rank of Chef de Bataillon could be implemented. A memorial to Bourdon was created for the Glasgow School of Art by Robert Anning Bell. Bourdon is also listed on the School's World War One Roll of Honour. The current School of Architecture at the Glasgow School of Art is based in a building named after Bourdon.

His obituary was written by Herbert F. Stockdale.
