= Eugène Bourdon =

French clockwork maker and inventor (1808–1884)

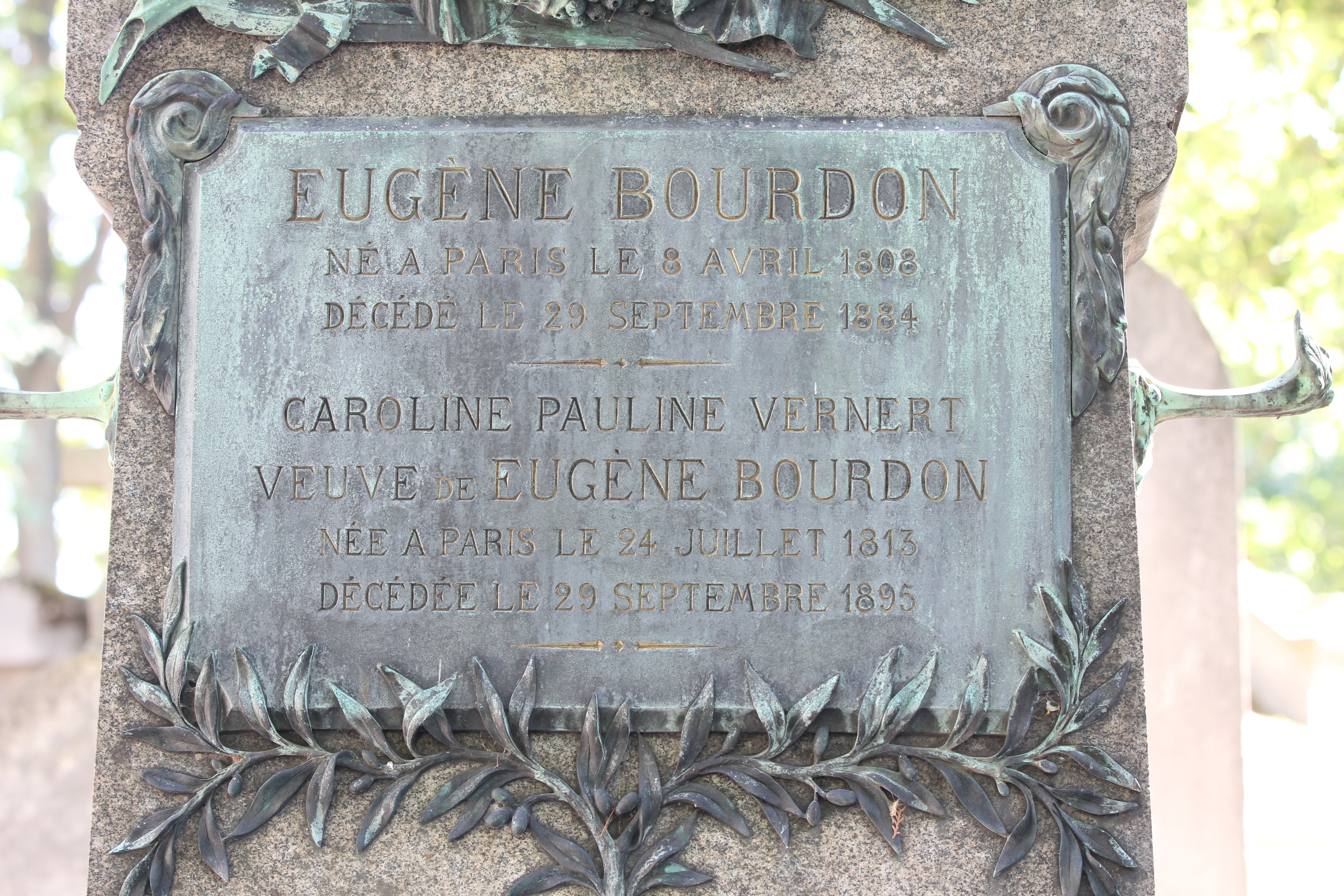
Tomb of Eugène Bourdon in the Père Lachaise Cemetery

Eugène Bourdon (1808–1884) was a French watchmaker and engineer. He is the inventor of the Bourdon tube pressure gauge for which he obtained a patent in 1849.

== Biography ==
Eugène Bourdon was born in Paris on 8 April 1808, the son of a silk merchant. From elementary school, he showed an interest in mechanical devices. His father sent him to Nuremberg for 2 years to learn German. Back in Paris, he assisted his father in his business until his father died in 1830. Eugène then worked in an optician's shop until 1832, when he set up his own workshop.

Eugène specialized in scientific instruments and model steam engines. While searching for a mechanism to measure gas pressure, without the use of a mercury manometer, he imagined using the bending of a circular tube made of a metal with good elastic properties. From this he developed the Bourdon tube pressure gauge, patented in Paris on 18 June 1849, and he granted a licence to the workshops of Felix Richard (1809-1876). His invention was crowned with the gold medal at the World's Fair in 1849. Two years later, at the World's Fair in 1851, he was awarded the Council Medal, shared with his competitor, Lucien Vidi.

== Death ==
Bourdon died on 29 September 1884 and is buried in the Père Lachaise Cemetery.
