= Sleep-learning =

Attempt to convey information to a sleeping person

Sleep-learning or sleep-teaching (also known as hypnopædia or hypnopedia) is an attempt to convey information to a sleeping person, typically by playing a sound recording to them while they sleep. Although sleep is considered an important period for memory consolidation, scientific research has concluded that sleep-learning is not possible. Once a concept explored in the early history of psychology, sleep-learning appears frequently in fiction and parapsychology, and is widely considered to be pseudoscience.

== History ==
In 1927, Alois Benjamin Saliger invented the "Psycho-Phone" or "Psychophone", a specialized version of Thomas Edison's phonograph, for sleep learning, stating: "It has been proven that natural sleep is identical with hypnotic sleep and that during natural sleep the unconscious mind is most receptive to suggestions." Saliger patented the device in 1932 as the "automatic time-controlled suggestion machine".

Since the electroencephalography studies by Charles W. Simon and William H. Emmons in 1956, learning by sleep has not been taken seriously. The researchers concluded that learning during sleep was "impractical and probably impossible". They reported that stimulus material presented during sleep was not recalled later when the subject awoke, unless alpha wave activity occurred at the same time the stimulus material was given.

== In fiction ==
Sleep-learning is found in influential science fiction and other literature. The following examples are listed chronologically by publication or original air date, when known.

- In Hugo Gernsback's 1911 story Ralph 124C 41+, one finds the Hypnobioscope, a sleep learning device.
- In Aldous Huxley's 1932 novel Brave New World, it is used for the conditioning of children into the novel's fictional future culture. In the novel, sleep-learning was discovered by accident when a Polish boy named Reuben Rabinovitch was able to recite an entire radio broadcast in English after a radio receiver was left on in his sleep. The boy was unable to comprehend what he had heard via hypnopædia, but it was soon realized that hypnopædia could be used to effectively make suggestions about morality.
- In Robert Heinlein's 1948 novel Space Cadet, the character Matt Dodson is taught to speak Venutian (the language of the planet Venus) while under drug-aided hypnosis. He surprises his Venus-born friend Oscar by spontaneously reproving him when Oscar utters a curse in Venutian. (Later in the novel, Matt appears to have forgotten what he learned and relies on Oscar for translation.)
- In the BBC Radio series Journey into Space (1953–1958), during the second and third parts of the trilogy, there were said to be Martians abducting people from the Earth and conditioning them to obey instructions or to make them believe things that were not true. The inception of this conditioning involved putting the subject into a hypnotic sleep and appraising them of a certain situation; once they awoke they would believe it, regardless of the validity.
- Teaching relatives while they are asleep to influence their waking behavior is at the heart of Guido Martina's and Giovan Battista Carpi's Disney comic story Paperino e la cura suggestiva ("Donald Duck and the Suggestive Cure"), first published in Topolino #187 (May 25, 1958).
- In a 1961 episode of My Three Sons, "A Lesson In Any Language", Mike connects a phonograph to an automatic timer to play Spanish lessons while he sleeps. Steve and Bub ultimately end up sleeping in the room and are able to speak fluent Spanish the following day.
- In Anthony Burgess's 1962 novel A Clockwork Orange, it is used to reverse the effects of the Ludovico Technique, a form of conditioning, which was used on the main character Alex to make him incapable of violent behavior. The conditioning was a new technique which was supposed to rehabilitate violent criminals in a short period of time, but which resulted in Alex attempting suicide. This reflected very badly on the government, which had sanctioned the experiment, so hypnopædia was used to undo the conditioning.
- In 1954 Günter Spang wrote a children's book called Lohengrin schwant etwas, meaning Lohengrin has a good idea, in which a bunch of schoolchildren take an easy way out of studying by learning in their sleep.
- In a 1963 episode of The Patty Duke Show, "The Conquering Hero", Cathy tries to help a failing basketball player pass a quiz. She suggests that the latest scientific method of "subconscious learning" will help. She records the lessons on a tape which plays repeatedly while he is asleep. He passes the quiz after the answers "come to him" while looking at the questions.
- In the 1965 episode of "I Spy" titled Chrysanthemum, the assigned partner of Bill Cosby and Robert Culp's characters, Maximilian de Broget claims to have learned Mandarin Chinese in his sleep.
- In the 1965 movie The Monkey's Uncle, a college student connects a phonograph to an automatic timer, which plays to sleeping students the voice of a girl reading their lessons aloud. This backfires in class, however—when asked to give an oral report, the students speak, but in the girl's voice.
- In the 1966 novel Flowers for Algernon, an intellectually disabled 37-year-old, Charlie Gordon, has an operation to increase his intelligence. Professor Nemur and Dr. Strauss then give Charlie a "teeching mashine that werks like T.V." Charlie explains to Professor Nemur that "I dint think I was goin to get smart anyway" [sic].
- The 1976 film Logan's Run contains a scene where Logan 5 (Michael York) chastises his friend Francis 7 (Richard Jordan) for his rigidly orthodox opinions, "You sound like a sleep-teacher with a stuck tape".
- In a 1988 episode of the BBC2 sitcom Red Dwarf, "Me^{2}", Arnold Rimmer uses sleep-learning tapes such as Learn Esperanto While You Sleep and Learn Quantum Theory While You Sleep, to the dismay of his bunkmate Dave Lister.
- In the 1990 movie Dragon Ball Z: The Tree of Might, Chi-Chi packs for her son Gohan a tape recorder so he can learn while he sleeps on a camping trip.
- In a 1992 episode of The Simpsons, "Bart's Friend Falls in Love", Homer orders hypnosis tapes which are supposed to induce weight loss. However, the mail-order company sends him vocabulary builder tapes instead, and Homer gets fatter and fatter while his vocabulary increases, through hypnopædia.
- In a 1996 episode of Dexter's Laboratory, "The Big Cheese", Dexter hooks himself up to a gramophone that repeats his lesson for a French class test the next morning. The gramophone gets stuck at the phrase omelette du fromage, and Dexter finds out the next morning that it is all he is capable of saying.
- In a 1997 episode of Friends, "The One with the Hypnosis Tape", Chandler borrows from Rachel a smoking-cessation audiocassette, to which he listens while he is asleep. The tape tells him that he is "a strong, confident woman" who does not need to smoke. He stops smoking, but also begins acting effeminately.
- In the 1997 PC game Outpost 2: Divided Destiny, one of the items available for research was hypnopædia, which allowed scientists to be trained more quickly.
- In a 2001 episode of Homestar Runner, "A Jorb Well Done", Coach Z attempts to overcome his speech impediment with the word "job" (which he pronounces as "jorb"). After unsuccessfully trying several methods, Strong Sad gives him a tape of him repeating the word job thousands of times, "from when (he) was practicing the dictionary". Coach Z takes it home and listens to it while he sleeps, and the next day is able to pronounce "job" correctly, but forgets Homestar's name.
- The twins Hank and Dean Venture, of the animated television program The Venture Bros., are homeschooled through the use of hypnopædic beds.

== See also ==
- Educational technology
- Mozart effect
- Nuremberg Funnel
- Sleep and learning, the science that ties sleep to learning
