= Sleep and creativity =

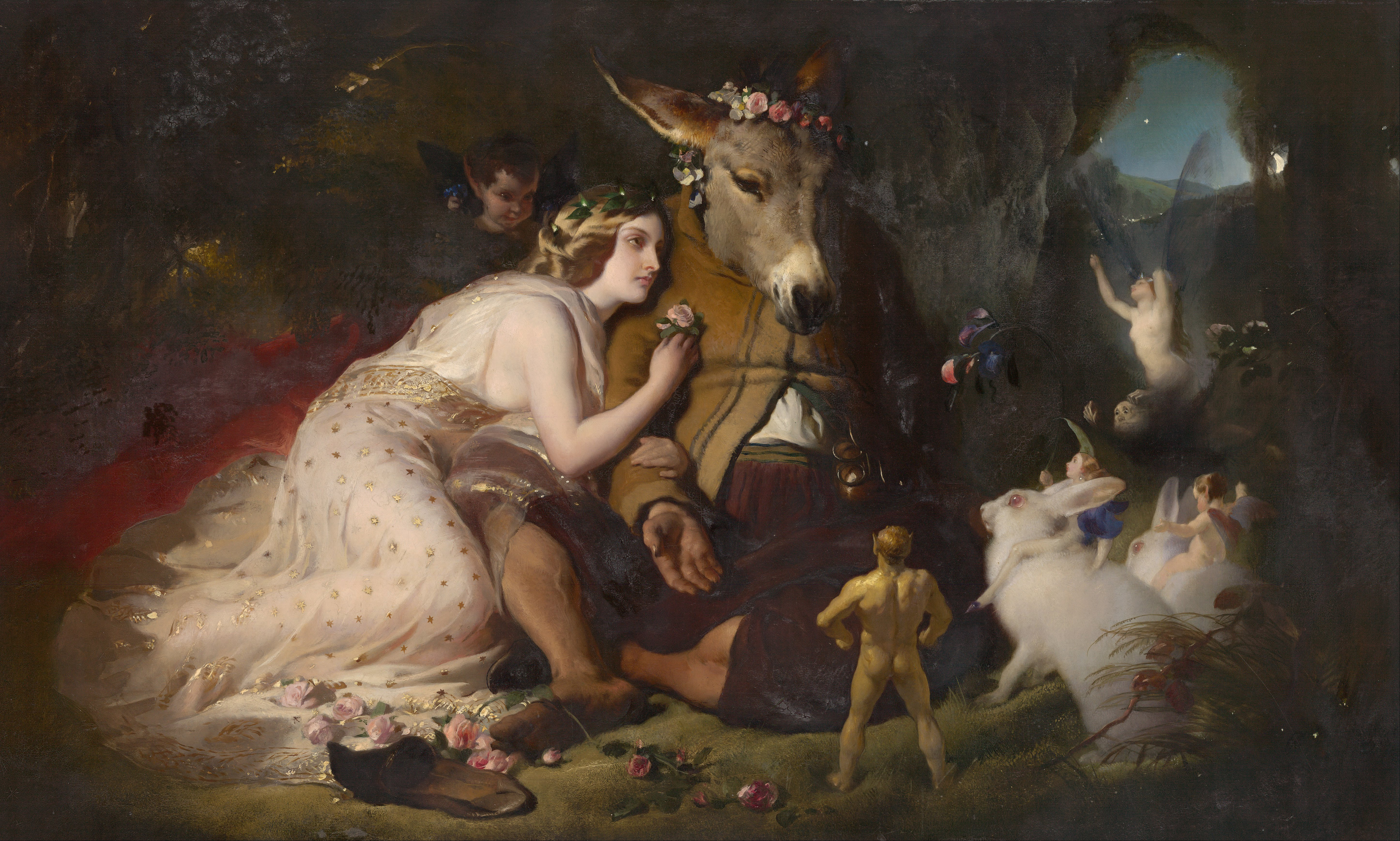
Scene from A Midsummer Night's Dream. Titania and Bottom by Sir Edwin Landseer

The majority of studies on sleep creativity have shown that sleep can facilitate insightful behavior and flexible reasoning, and there are several hypotheses about the creative function of dreams. On the other hand, a few recent studies have supported a theory of creative insomnia, in which creativity is significantly correlated with sleep disturbance.

== Anecdotal accounts of sleep and creativity ==
- Jack Nicklaus had a dream that allowed him to correct his golf swing.
- German chemist Friedrich August Kekulé stated that the idea for the ring structure of benzene came to him in a day-dream, in which he saw snakes biting their own tails.
- Jasper Johns was inspired to paint his first flag painting as a result of a dream.
- Aphex Twin wrote much of the music on his album Selected Ambient Works Volume II by going to sleep in the studio, and then recreating the sounds he heard in dreams as soon as he woke up.
- Robert Louis Stevenson came up with the plot of Strange Case of Dr Jekyll and Mr Hyde during a dream.
- Paul McCartney discovered the tune for the song "Yesterday" in a dream and was inspired to write "Yellow Submarine" during hypnagogia.
- Mary Shelley's Frankenstein was inspired by a dream at Lord Byron's villa.
- British poet Samuel Taylor Coleridge wrote "Kubla Khan" after finding inspiration from an opium induced dream.
- Otto Loewi, a German physiologist, won the Nobel Prize for medicine in 1936 for his work on the chemical transmission of nerve impulses. He discovered in a dream how to prove his theory.
- Giuseppe Tartini, a composer, gained inspiration for his Devil's Trill Sonata in a dream where the Devil appeared to him and played the melody on Tartini's violin.
- An alternative interpretation of The Sleep of Reason Produces Monsters considers Francisco Goya's commitment to the creative process and the Romantic spirit—the unleashing of imagination, emotions, and even nightmares as made possible by the unconscious.

== Sleep and creativity studies ==
=== REM sleep as a state of increased cognitive flexibility ===
In a study on cognitive flexibility across the sleep-wake cycle, researchers discovered that when woken from REM sleep, participants had a 32% advantage on an anagram task (when compared with the number of correct responses after NREM awakenings). This was consistent with the hypothesis that due to the lack of aminergic dominance in REM sleep, this particular sleep state is highly conducive to fluid reasoning and flexible thought. Participant performance after awakening from REM sleep was not better than participants who stayed awake, which indicates that in REM sleep, there is an alternative (but just as effective) mode of problem solving that differs from the mechanism available while awake.

=== Sleep facilitates insight ===
Participants in a study were asked to translate a string of digits using two simple rules that allowed the string to be reduced to a single digit (number reduction task). Out of three groups of participants (those who slept, those who stayed awake during the day, and those who stayed awake during the night), participants who got eight hours of sleep were two times as likely during retesting to gain insight into a hidden rule built into the task. In a 1993 study at Harvard Medical School, psychologist Deidre Barrett, PhD, asked her students to imagine a problem they were trying to solve before going to sleep. It was found that her students were able to come up with rational solutions to their problems in their dreams. In this study published in Dreaming (Vol. 3, No. 2), 50% of the students that participated reported having dreams that addressed their chosen problems, while 25% came up with solutions in their dreams.

Results presented in a study published in Science Advances (2021) demonstrated that the brain activity during sleep onset (N1 sleep) increased creativity after waking, with even a single minute of N1 inspiring insight. However, this effect vanished if subjects reached deeper sleep.

=== Lack of sleep impairs creativity ===
Some participants in a study went 32 hours without sleep while the control participants slept normally. When tested on flexibility and originality on figural and verbal tests, the sleep-deprived participants had severe and persistent impairments in their performance. A study tested 30 undergraduate students from seven different academic institutions, half majoring in art and half majoring in social sciences. Among all the participants, the higher the level of visual creativity, the lower the quality of their sleep was. The researchers also found that the higher the participants' level of verbal creativity, the more hours they slept and the later they went to sleep and woke up.

=== Sleep and Humor ===
Under hypnotic-induced sleep, participants were much more likely to produce paraphrases of jokes that they had heard before and to spontaneously create new jokes (when compared with their performance while awake).

=== Integration of relational memory ===
Recent studies have also shown that sleep not only helps consolidate memory, but also integrates relational memories. In one study, the participants were tested to see if sleep helped in this aspect (Ellenbogen et al., 2007, as cited in Walker, 2009). The subjects of the experiment were taught five "premise pairs", A>B, B>C, C>D, and D>E. They were not aware of the overall hierarchy, where A>B>C>D>E. The subjects were split into 3 separate groups. The first group was tested 20 minutes after learning the pairs, the second was tested 12 hours later without sleep, and the third was tested 12 hours later with sleep in between. The groups were tested in both first degree pairs (A>B, C>D, etc.) and 2nd degree pairs (A>C, B>D, or C>E). The results were that with the first degree pairs, the first group only performed at around chance levels, and the second and third groups had significantly better performances. With the 2nd degree pairs, the first group still performed at around chance levels, and the second group performed at about the same level as in the 1st degree pair test. However, the third group performed even better than before, gaining a 25% advantage over the group without sleep. The results of this study showed that sleep is a significant factor in integrating memories, or gaining the bigger picture.

== Creative insomnia ==
Creative insomnia refers to the idea that insomnia can actually spark creativity.

=== Anecdotal accounts of creative insomnia ===
- Marcel Proust wrote most of his À la recherche du temps perdu (In Search of Lost Time) while staying awake in the night due to a chronic illness. In Sodome et Gomorrhe, he suggests that "Un peu d'insomnie n'est pas inutile pour apprécier le sommeil, projeter quelque lumière dans cette nuit. [A little insomnia is useful for appreciating sleep, for projecting some light into this night.]"
- Film-maker Alan Berliner made a documentary on his lifelong insomnia and its complex role in his creative process.
- "Insomnia is almost an oasis in which those who have to think or suffer darkly take refuge." – Colette
- "It's at night, when perhaps we should be dreaming, that the mind is most clear, that we are most able to hold all our life in the palm of our skull. I don't know if anyone has ever pointed out that great attraction of insomnia before, but it is so; the night seems to release a little more of our vast backward inheritance of instincts and feelings; as with the dawn, a little honey is allowed to ooze between the lips of the sandwich, a little of the stuff of dreams to drip into the waking mind. I wish I believed, as J. B. Priestley did, that consciousness continues after disembodiment or death, not forever, but for a long while. Three score years and ten is such a stingy ration of time, when there is so much time around. Perhaps that's why some of us are insomniacs; night is so precious that it would be pusillanimous to sleep all through it! A 'bad night' is not always a bad thing." – Brian W. Aldiss
- Acquainted with the Night: Insomnia Poems (edited by Lisa Russ Spaar) is a collection of over eighty poems by famous poets and writers like Walt Whitman, Emily Bronté and Robert Frost, all inspired by sleepless nights. Fifteen of the poems actually have "insomnia" in the title.
- "Si les insomnies d'un musicien lui font créer de belles oeuvres, ce sont de belles insomnies. [If the insomnia of a musician allows him to create beautiful pieces, it is a beautiful insomnia.]" – Antoine de Saint-Exupéry
- Vladimir Nabokov believed that insomnia was a positive influence on his work. He once remarked that "sleep is the most moronic fraternity in the world, with the heaviest dues and the crudest rituals."

=== Studies that support creative insomnia ===
Although no studies have actually shown a causal relationship yet, various studies have suggested that the positive relationship between sleep and creativity is more complicated and less clear-cut than previously thought.

- One study with children (ages 10–12) in New Zealand demonstrated a correlation between insomnia and creative thought. This study looked at the incidence of sleep disturbances in thirty highly creative children when compared with thirty control children. The hypothesis was that there would be a higher incidence of sleep disturbance in the highly creative children than in the control children. Results showed that there was a significant difference between the two groups, with the creative children reporting more sleep disturbance, therefore suggesting that creative ability may indeed affect an individual's sleep patterns. More specifically, out of the sixty children tested on a standard creativity test, seventeen of the highly creative children indicated that they had higher levels of sleep disturbance (compared to only eight of the control children).
- In another study that examined the interactive relationships between sleep, fatigue, creativity and personality, participants were given the "Sleep Questionnaire", the "Fatigue Inventory", the "Remote Association Test" and the "Probabilistic Orientation Test". The researchers found that arousal measures of sleep and fatigue were meaningfully related to one another, but not to measures of thinking and of attitudinal orientations. Most importantly, they found that creativity was not significantly related to any of the dimensions of sleep.

=== Studies that reject creative insomnia ===
- In a series of three studies that analyzed the link between creativity, dreams, and sleep behaviors, researchers discovered that: (1) participants who were classified as "fast sleepers" (those who fell asleep quickly) were more likely to score highly on a creativity test, (2) participants who scored highly on a creativity test were more likely to solve their problems through dreams and to fall asleep quickly, and (3) adults in creative occupations have significantly more dream distortion, visual mentation, and regressive dream content.

== See also ==
- Dreams
- Creativity
- Sleep and learning
