= The Isolator =

The Isolator may refer to

- The Isolator (helmet)
- The Isolator (novel series)
