= Sexology (magazine) =

Magazine devoted to human sexuality (1933–1983)

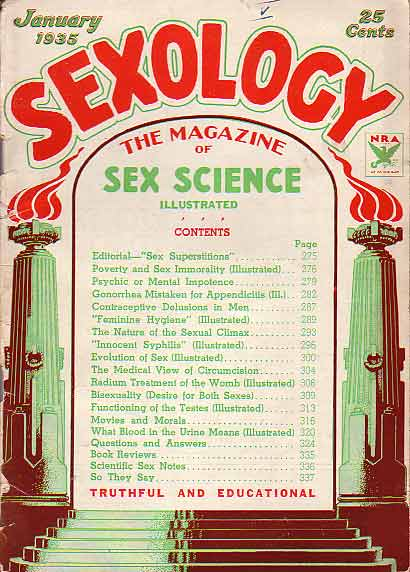
Cover of a 1935 issue of Sexology

Sexology was a magazine about the practice of human sexuality, founded by polymath and publisher Hugo Gernsback. It was published in New York City between 1933 and 1983. The magazine had a circulation of up to 200,000 at its peak, and was also known under the titles Sexology Together and Sexology Today. At time of closure, the magazine was published by Medi-Media Publications.
