= Alois Benjamin Saliger =

American inventor and businessman (1880–1969)

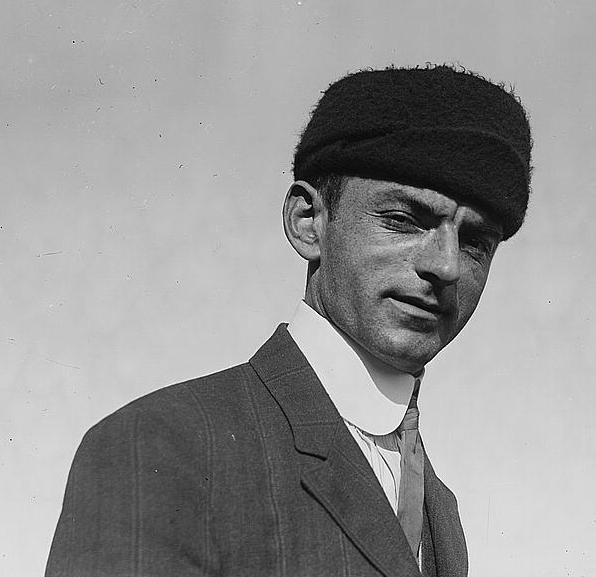

Alois Benjamin Saliger (June 30, 1880 – April 1969), also known as A. B. Saliger, was a New York City-based Czech inventor, businessman, and immigrant. In 1927, he invented the Psycho-Phone or Psychophone, a modified version of American inventor Thomas Edison's phonograph that Saliger intended to be used in the field of psychology.

== Biography ==
He was born on June 30, 1880, in Bartošovice v Orlických horách in the Kingdom of Bohemia in the Austro-Hungarian Empire, now the Czech Republic, to Marie and Frank Saliger.

He was the owner of the Saliger Ship Salvage Company in New York, and was charged with stock fraud in 1919.

In 1927, he invented the Psycho-Phone, or Psychophone, for sleep learning: "It has been proven that natural sleep is identical with hypnotic sleep, nd that during natural sleep the unconscious mind is most receptive to suggestions." He died in April 1969.
