= Nuremberg Funnel =

Mechanical way of learning and teaching (joking)

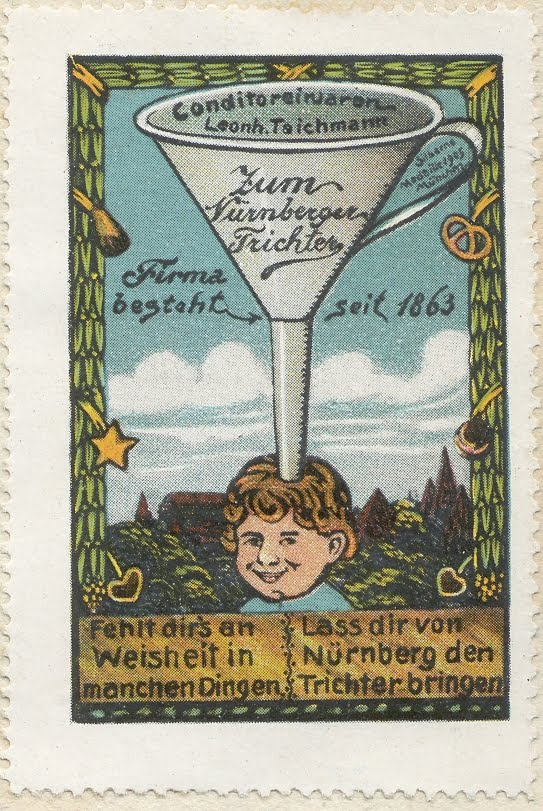
1910 Nuremberg poster stamp depicting the Nuremberg funnel ("If you lack wisdom in some matters, let them bring you the Funnel from Nuremberg")

Nuremberg Funnel (German: Nürnberger Trichter) is a jocular description of a mechanical or overly simplified way of learning and teaching. On the one hand, it evokes the image of a student learning their lessons almost without effort through such a method; on the other hand, it suggests a teacher who is able to teach everything even to the "stupidest" pupil. It can also refer metaphorically to forceful teaching or imposition of someone's ideas, ideology, or beliefs.

== Etymology ==
The phrase "Nuremberg Funnel", which is familiar in German-speaking countries, originates in the title of a 17th-century poetics textbook by Georg Philipp Harsdörffer (1607–1658), a Nuremberg poet and co-founder of the Pegnesischer Blumenorden. The word appeared in Nuremberg in 1647 under the title Poetischer Trichter. Die Teutsche Dicht- und Reimkunst, ohne Behuf der lateinischen Sprache, in VI Stunden einzugießen (Poetic funnel: The art of German poetry and rhyme, without the use of the Latin language, poured in over six hours). Due to the wide distribution of the work, the expression "Nuremberg funnel" eventually became a common idiomatic expression.

The idiom "to funnel something in" (meaning "to drum something in') or "to get something funneled in" (meaning "to get something drummed in") is older than the image of the "Nuremberg Funnel". It was first recorded in a collection of proverbs by Sebastian Franck in 1541, although without reference to the city of Nuremberg.

The Nuremberg funnel has been cited as an influence in "hypnopaedia", or sleep learning.

== Literature ==
- Franz Kaiser: Der Nürnberger Trichter. Illustrated by Emeli Werzinger. Nuremberg: Sebaldus-Verlag, 1946, 12 pages, IDN: 354205862.
- Hans Recknagel; Rolf Veit: Wagenseils Nürnberger Trichter. Zur Geschichte einer Redensart. In: Mitteilungen der Altnürnberger Landschaft e.V., Booklet 1, 2001, pp. 571–581.
- Dagmar Hirschfelder: Der "Nürnberger Trichter" – Ein Allheilmittel gegen die Dummheit? In: KulturGUT – Aus der Forschung des Germanischen Nationalmuseums, booklet 8, 2006, pp. 3–5.
