= Ralph 124C 41+ =

1911 novel by Hugo Gernsback

Ralph 124C 41 +
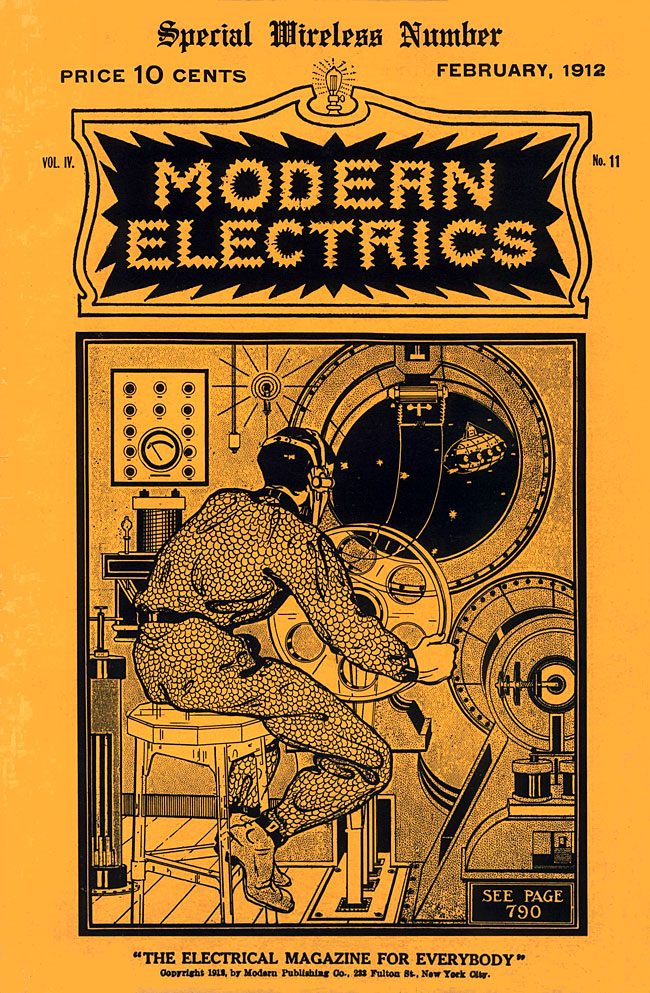
- Serialized in Modern Electrics
- Author: Hugo Gernsback
- Language: English
- Genre: Science fiction novel
- Publication date: 1911
- Publication place: United States
- Media type: Print (hardback & paperback)

Ralph 124C 41 +, by Hugo Gernsback, is an early science fiction novel, written as a twelve-part serial in Modern Electrics magazine, which Gernsback edited, beginning in April 1911. It was compiled into novel/book form in 1925. While it pioneered many ideas found in later science fiction, it has been critically panned for its "inept writing." The title contains a gramogram, meaning "One to foresee for one another." In the introduction to the first volume of Science-Fiction Plus, dated March 1953, Gernsback called for patent reform to give science fiction authors the right to create patents for ideas without having patent models because many of their ideas predated the technical progress needed to develop specifications for their ideas. The introduction referenced the numerous prescient technologies described throughout Ralph 124C 41+.

== Plot summary ==
The eponymous protagonist saves the life of the heroine by directing energy remotely at an approaching avalanche. Furthermore, he describes the technological wonders of the modern world, frequently using the phrase "As you know..." The hero finally rescues the heroine by traveling into space on his own "space flyer" to rescue her from the villain's clutches.

== Accurate predictions ==
The novel includes microfilm, the vending machine, the jukebox (both existed when it was written), satellites, spaceflight, the tape recorder, artificial cloth, television (and channel surfing) as well as remote-control power transmission, the videophone, transcontinental air service, solar energy in practical use, sound movies, synthetic milk and foods, and voiceprinting.

It also contains "...the first accurate description of radar, complete with diagram...", according to Arthur C. Clarke in his "non-genre" novel Glide Path (1963): "A pulsating polarized ether wave, if directed on a metal object can be reflected in the same manner as a light-ray is reflected from a bright surface or from a mirror..."

== Specially named inventions and technological devices ==
Accelerated Plant Growing Farms
Huge greenhouse farms that are used to feed the rapidly growing Earth population. They can grow five harvests per year as opposed to normal harvests of two in 1911.
Aeroflyer
A small flying transport that can reach speeds of up to 600 mph (1,000 km/h).
Appetizer
A large waiting room in more scientifically advanced restaurants. The room is flooded with gases that increase the appetite/hunger before eating.
Automatic-Electric Packing Machines
Bacillatorium
A decontamination chamber for the home. It uses fictional Arcturium rays to kill bacteria, which can extend a person's total life expectancy to 120–140 years.
Electromobiles
Basically an electric car that receives energy through a collector mast from city generators.
Gyroscope
This is used to fly to other planets. Rocket propulsion is not mentioned at all. The rotation of a gyroscope can be used to counter vertical gravity.
Helio-Dynamophores
Basically solar panels. To minimize atmospheric interference, Meteoro-Towers are used.
Hypnobioscope
A sleep learning device. Information is recorded on black film as a white wavy line that is transmitted to the sleeper via wires into a headband with metal plates.
Language Rectifier
A real-time translator built into the Telephot (see below).
Luminor
An automated lighting system that responds to voice commands to activate and change the intensity of illumination. This is an example of fluorescent lighting or cold light, but the term fluorescent lighting is not used in the story.
Menograph
A device that can record a person's thoughts in writing using a type of mind-script.
Money
The value of money is based on the faith and credit of the government. It can be dispensed like a roll tape. Denominations can be torn off the tape. No mention of electronic money is made.
Meteoro-Towers
Weather control stations.
Newspaper
A postage stamp-sized newspaper consisting of 8 pages. It can only be read by inserting it into a projector or portable viewer to see the very tiny print. Each page can be revealed by exposing it to a different color of light, which will also hide the other 7 pages from sight. It is updated every 30 minutes. No mention of electronic news or an internet is made.
Packet-Post Conveyor
Underground postal delivery system using conveyor belts.
Permagatol
A green gas that preserves organic matter indefinitely without any deterioration whatsoever.
Phonolphabet Machine
A voice recorder that records speech graphically using a phonolphabet language. One can either read the recording or play it back as an audio recording.
Platinum-Barium-Arturium Eyeglasses
Basically X-ray specs that really work, except they can only detect radium-infused elements through solid matter.
Pulsating Polarized Ether Wave
Basically a type of radar device before the word "radar" was coined.
Radioperforer
A handheld weapon that shoots Radium beams that can stun or kill.
Signalizers
A searchlight guidance system for flying machines consisting of multiple colors and blinking patterns
Space Flyer
An interplanetary flying machine using gyroscopes.
Subatlantic Tube
An underground train that uses magnetism to move 300 mph. The path of the tube is through the Earth to make a direct path from Europe to North America.
Telautograph
A device to transfer handwriting through a Telephot (picture phone). Basically a fax machine, except handwriting transfers as the person writes.
Tele-Motor Coasters
Telephot
This is basically a picture phone. It also includes a universal translator, where language translation can be opted using a dial control.
Teleradiograph
Tele-Theater
This is like a television, but with differences. It is really a series of telephots that almost seamlessly combine to make up one large picture. Live events like an opera or a play can be seen from one's home with this device. Communications can be made in both directions while the device is broadcasting. It is not mentioned if it can be used to show previously recorded entertainment.
Vacation City
A domed city suspended 20,000 feet in the air using a device that nullifies gravity. No mechanical devices are permitted in such cities because they are strictly used as an escape from a mechanized world.

== Influence and critical reception ==
Even though Ralph 124C 41+ has been described as pioneering many of the tropes and ideas found in later science fiction works, it has largely been neglected due to what critics often describe as poor artistic quality. Brian Aldiss has called the story a "tawdry illiterate tale" and a "sorry concoction," while Lester del Rey called it "simply dreadful." Martin Gardner referred to the book as "surely the worst SF novel ever written." Groff Conklin more generously described it as "thoroughly delightful... [with] the genuine charm of a sound, workmanlike antique."

Reviewing the 1950 Frederick Fell edition in The New York Times, Rex Lardner wrote that while the "fine" novel "contain[ed] a good deal of sound prophecy,... it has a narrative style as quaint as the retarder on a Hupmobile." Everett F. Bleiler similarly noted that "The literary treatment is on a very low level, but Ralph 124C41+ is renowned for its many highly imaginative technical projections."

While most critics have little positive to say about the story's writing, Gary Westfahl, one of the book's few public defenders, considered it "essential text for all studies of science fiction," and The Economist called it "arguably the first major work of American science fiction." According to Westfahl, "the novel merits attention because of the ways Gernsback uneasily blended several generic models – melodrama, the travel tale, Utopia, even touches of Gothic and Satire – in an effort to achieve a workable vehicle for a story emphasizing scientific facts and predictions. In this way, the novel foreshadows and makes explicit many of the generic tensions that permeate later sf."

== See also ==
- 1911 in science fiction
