= Electrician and Mechanic =

American science and technology magazine

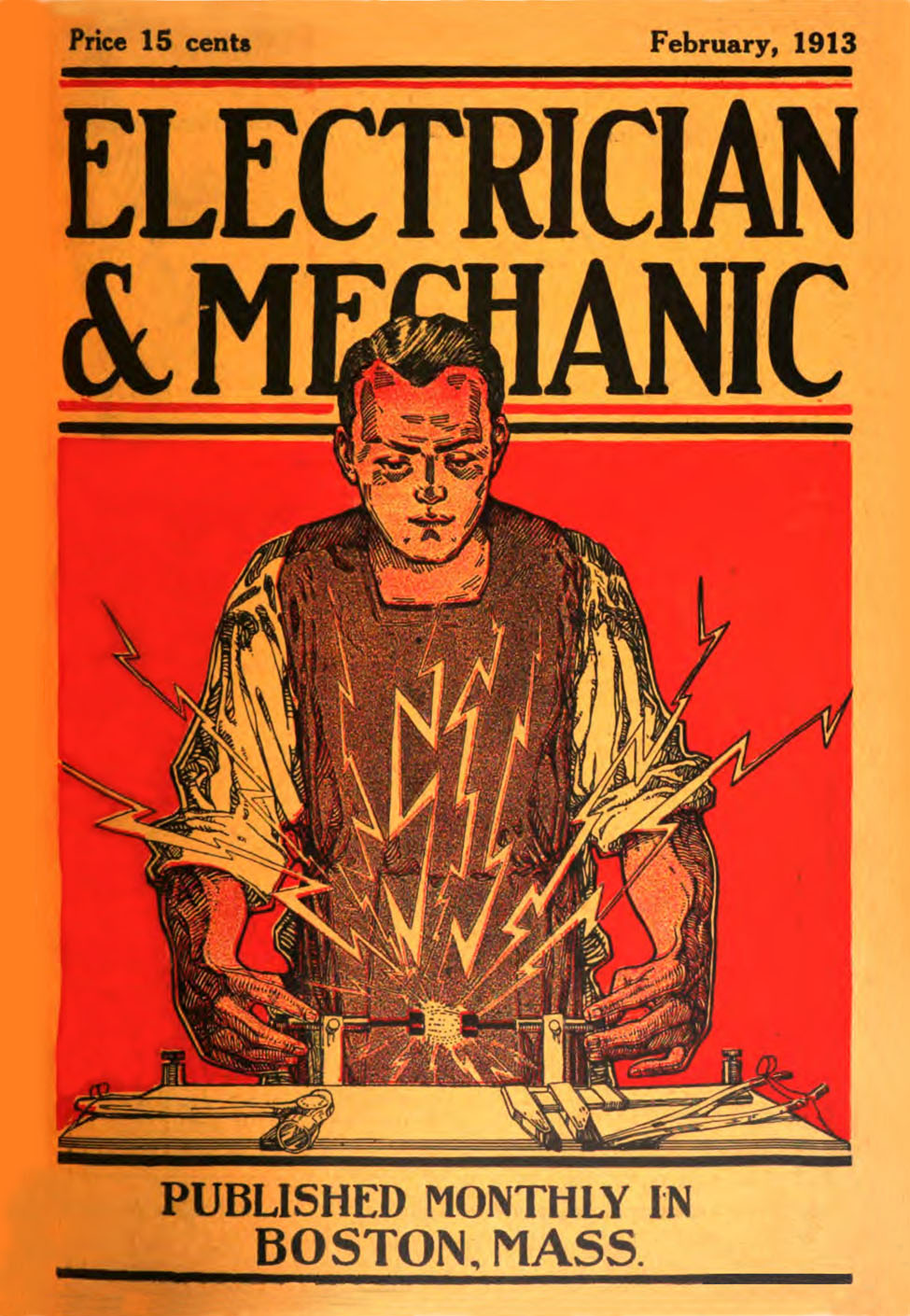
Electrician and Mechanic February 1913

Electrician and Mechanic was an American science and technology magazine published from 1890 to January 1914 when it merged with Modern Electrics to become Modern Electrics & Mechanics. In July 1914, incorporated with Popular Electricity and the World's Advance and the title became Popular Electricity and Modern Mechanics. The new publisher, Modern Publishing, began a series of magazine mergers and title changes so numerous that librarians began to complain. In October 1915 the title became Popular Science Monthly and the magazine is still published under that name today.

== Origin ==
Bubier's Popular Electrician (founded 1890) was acquired by Frank R. Fraprie and the newly formed Sampson Publishing Company in May 1906. The name was changed to Electrician & Mechanic with the July issue. The editors were Frank Fraprie, Arthur Eugene Watson and Mary Otis Sampson. Sampson was also the treasurer and director of the publishing company. (Fraprie and Sampson were married in 1911.)

By 1912, Electrician and Mechanic had absorbed three other magazines; Amateur Work, Building Craft and Collins Wireless Bulletin. The magazine typically had about 100 pages and each issue covered a wide variety of topics in electricity, wireless radio, machining, mechanical drawing, wood working and chemistry. There were articles for radio technicians such as "The Calculation of Inductance" that details how to design and wind coils for a wireless telegraphy set. A skilled machinist might read about "The Production of Accurate Screw-Threads in a Lathe". There were also articles for the hobbyist readers. Woodworkers could find plans for an armchair or a simple letter box.

== Mergers ==
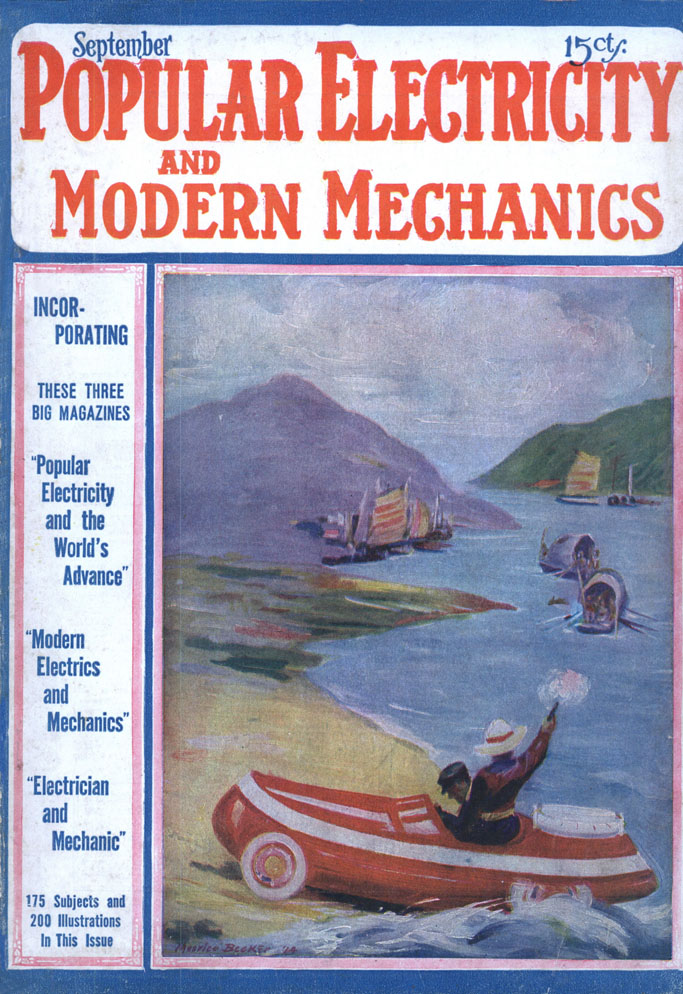
The magazine had 7 titles in just over 2 years

Hugo Gernsback's Electro Importing Company catalogs had elaborate instructions on how to use the electrical and radio parts they sold. These catalogs spawned Modern Electrics in April 1908 and the magazine had over 100,000 readers by 1911. In March 1913, Gernsback sold the magazine and the Modern Publishing Company to his business partner, Orland Ridenour. Modern Publishing acquired Electrician and Mechanic and merged it with Modern Electrics. The new magazine, Modern Electrics and Mechanics, was published from January 1914 to June 1914. Gernsback started a new magazine, The Electrical Experimenter, in May 1913.

Popular Electricity Publishing of Chicago merged Popular Electricity in Plain English (founded May 1908) with World's Advance in September 1913. Modern Publishing acquired Popular Electricity and World's Advance and combined it with Modern Electrics and Mechanics in July 1914. The new magazine was Popular Electricity and Modern Mechanics but it soon changed the title to Modern Mechanics and was World's Advance by April 1915.

The numerous title changes were a topic of discussion in library journals of the time. Libraries would have individual magazines bound into books. A typical size magazine would be bound into volumes every six months, magazine publishers would normally change titles or merge magazines on these volume boundaries. This was not the case with Modern Publishing. The following editorial appeared in the April 1915 Bulletin of Bibliography.

The World's Advance is a new title in magazinedom, and April 1915, is the initial number. Oh, no, not a new magazine, it is vol. 30, number 4; it was Modern Mechanics recently, and back of that — but let it tell its own story of absorptions, marriages, serial-cannibalism or whatever you may call its checkered life hitherto. The World's Advance, formerly Modern Mechanics, with which is combined Popular Electricity and The World's Advance, Modern Electrics and Mechanics, Electrician and Mechanic, is the outgrowth of a number of consolidated magazines. First was Popular Electrician founded in Lynn, Mass., in 1890, taken over later by Electrician and Mechanic, Boston. This absorbed Amateur Work, and Building Craft and in January 1914, was itself merged in Modern Electrics of New York, and called Modern Electrics and Mechanics. Then Popular Electricity and the World's Advance of Chicago was combined with it under the name of Popular Electricity and Modern Mechanics. This name being too long Modern Mechanics was decided upon for the new name, but this being found liable to confusion with a similar periodical [called Popular Mechanics], the name World's Advance was adopted." Some pedigree! But it's now a capital magazine for those of a mechanical turn of mind, and is profusely illustrated.

World's Advance had a readership of 135,000 "men" by 1915. A notice in a trade publication for advertisers stated, "72% of its readers are over 21 years old and it is exclusively a man's publication without waste circulation among women and children."

== Popular Science Monthly ==
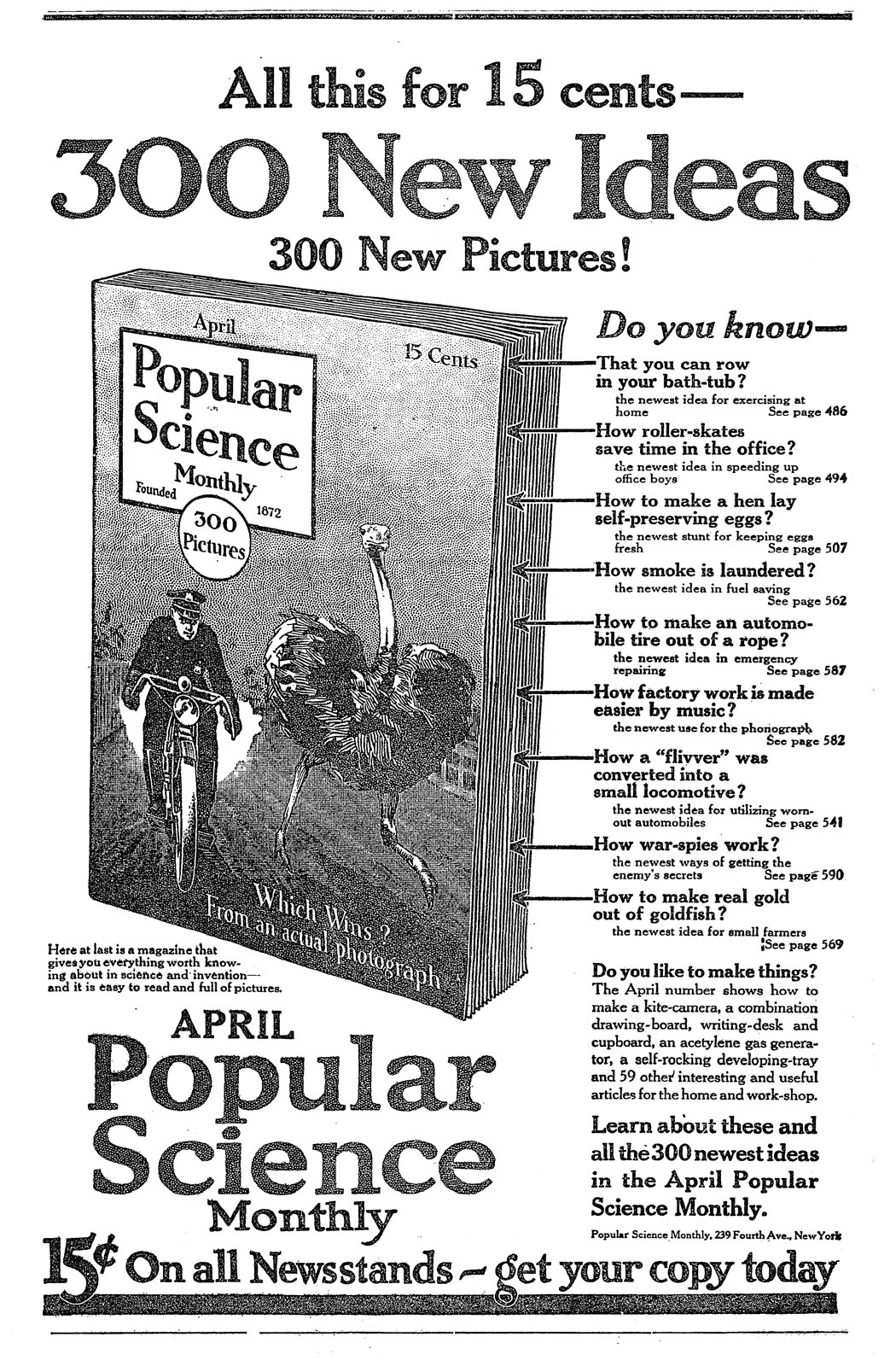
A 1916 advertisement

Popular Science Monthly was founded in May 1872 by Edward L. Youmans. It was a science and technology magazine equivalent to Scientific American or Science. James McKeen Cattell became the editor in 1900 and the publisher in 1901. Cattell had a background in academics and continued publishing articles for educated readers. By 1915 the readership was declining and publishing a science journal was a financial challenge. In a September 1915 editorial, Cattell related these difficulties to his readers and that the journal had been "transferred" to a group that wanted the name for a general audience magazine. Next month the subscribers would be receive a new journal titled Scientific Monthly that would continue the academic tradition. Scientific Monthly was published until 1958 when it was absorbed into Science.

The new owners were Henry Fisher, Robert Wilson and Oliver Capen of Modern Publishing. The October 1915 issue was titled Popular Science Monthly and World's Advance. The volume number (Vol. 87, No. 4) was that of Popular Science but the content was that of World's Advance. The new editor was Waldemar Kaempffert, a former editor of Scientific American

The change in Popular Science Monthly was dramatic. The old version was a scholarly journal that had eight to ten articles in a 100-page issue. There would be ten to twenty photographs or illustrations. The new version had hundreds of short, easy to read articles with hundreds of illustrations. Editor Kaembffert was writing for "the home craftsman and hobbyist who wanted to know something about the world of science." The circulation doubled in the first year.

Popular Science Monthly was two different magazines for during the last half of 1915 and this presented a dilemma for librarians who needed to have them bound into book volumes. The library journal, Bulletin of Bibliography, printed the conflicting recommendations received from the new and old publishers. The journal editor promised to publish a "list of librarians and book-binders who have gone to Battle Creek to recuperate."

== Title changes ==
Dates	Title	Volume and Issue
1890 – Jun. 1906	Bubier's Popular Electrician	Vol. 1 No. 1 – Vol. 16 No. 6
Jul. 1906 – Dec. 1913	Electrician and Mechanic	Vol. 17 No. 1 – Vol. 27 No. 6
Jan. 1914 – Jun. 1914	Modern Electrics and Mechanics	Vol. 28 No. 1 – 6
Jul. 1914 – Dec. 1914	Popular Electricity and Modern Mechanics	Vol. 29 No. 1 – 6
Jan. 1915 – Mar. 1915	Modern Mechanics	Vol. 30 No. 1 – 3
Apr. 1915 – Sep. 1915	World's Advance	Vol. 30 No. 4 – Vol. 31 No 3
Oct. 1915 – Dec. 1915	Popular Science Monthly and World's Advance	Vol. 87 No. 4 – No. 6
Jan. 1916 – Current	Popular Science Monthly	Vol. 88 No. 1 –

Source for volume and issue numbers: Catalog of Copyright Entries, Volume 9 and 10. January 1914 to December 1915.

== Covers and pages ==
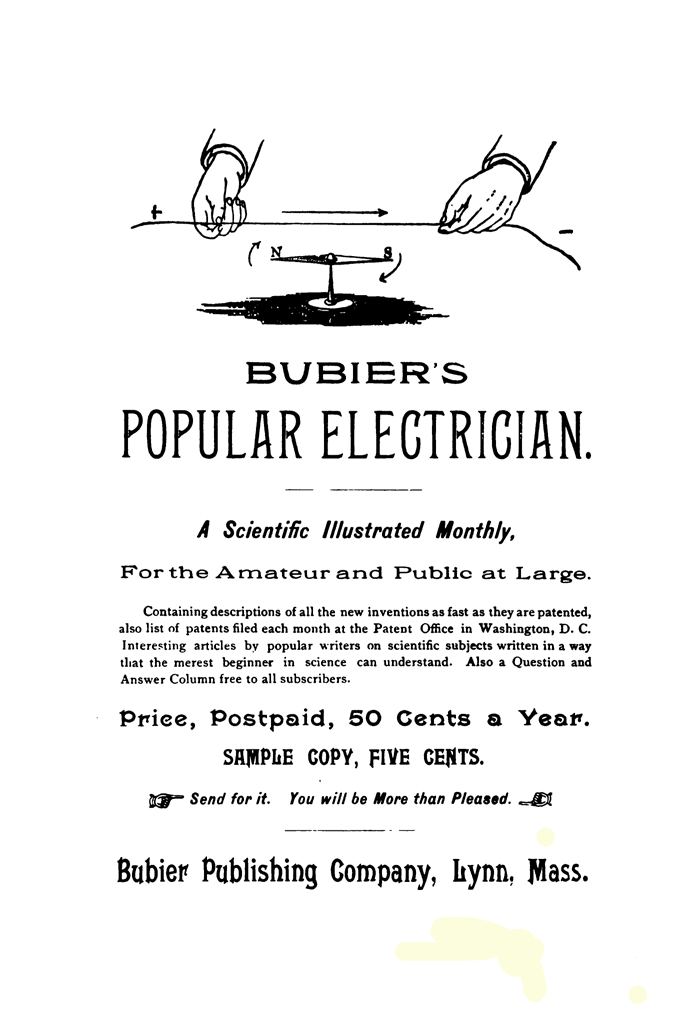
1893 Ad for Bubier's Popular Electrician

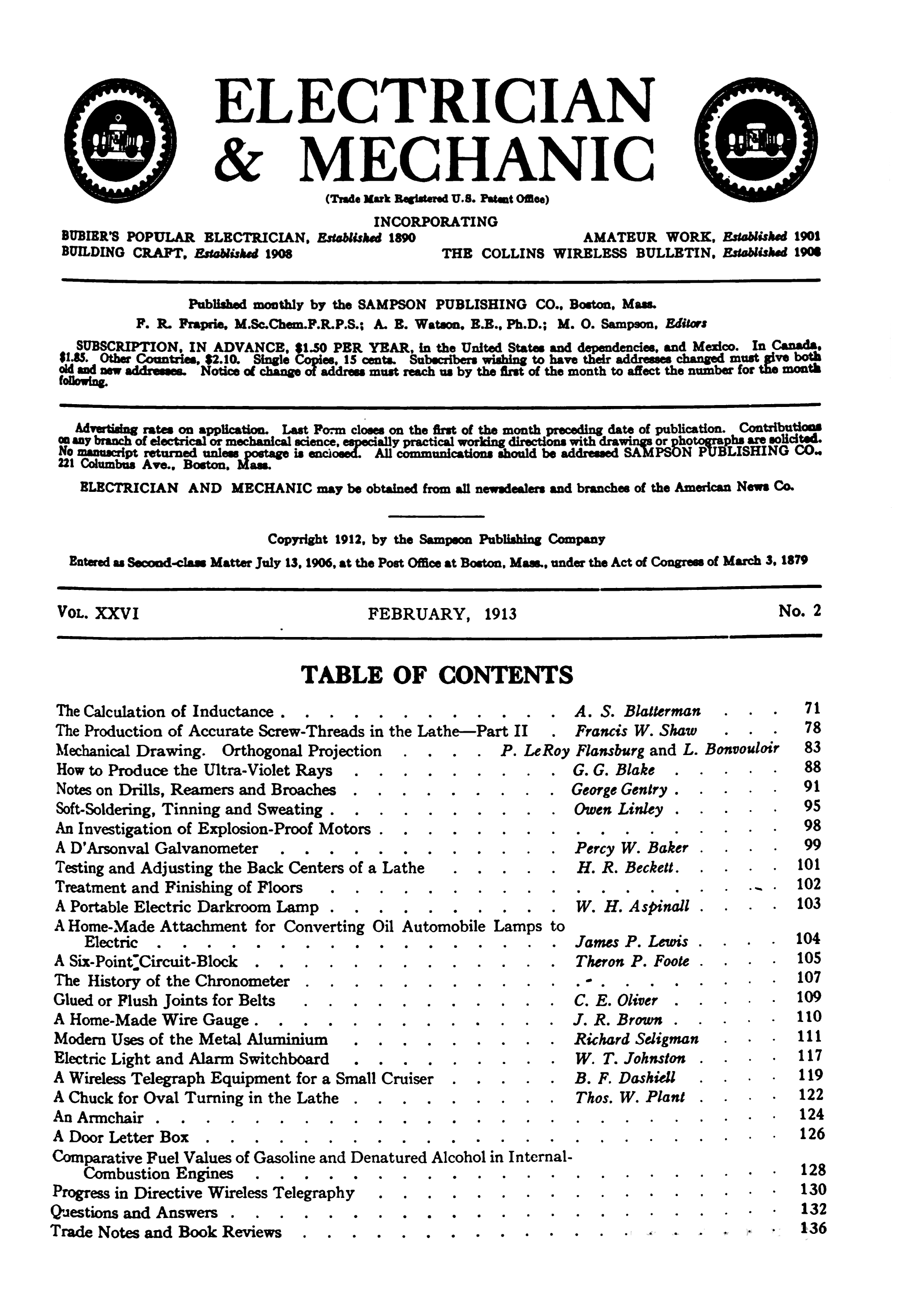
Electrician and Mechanic February 1913 Contents

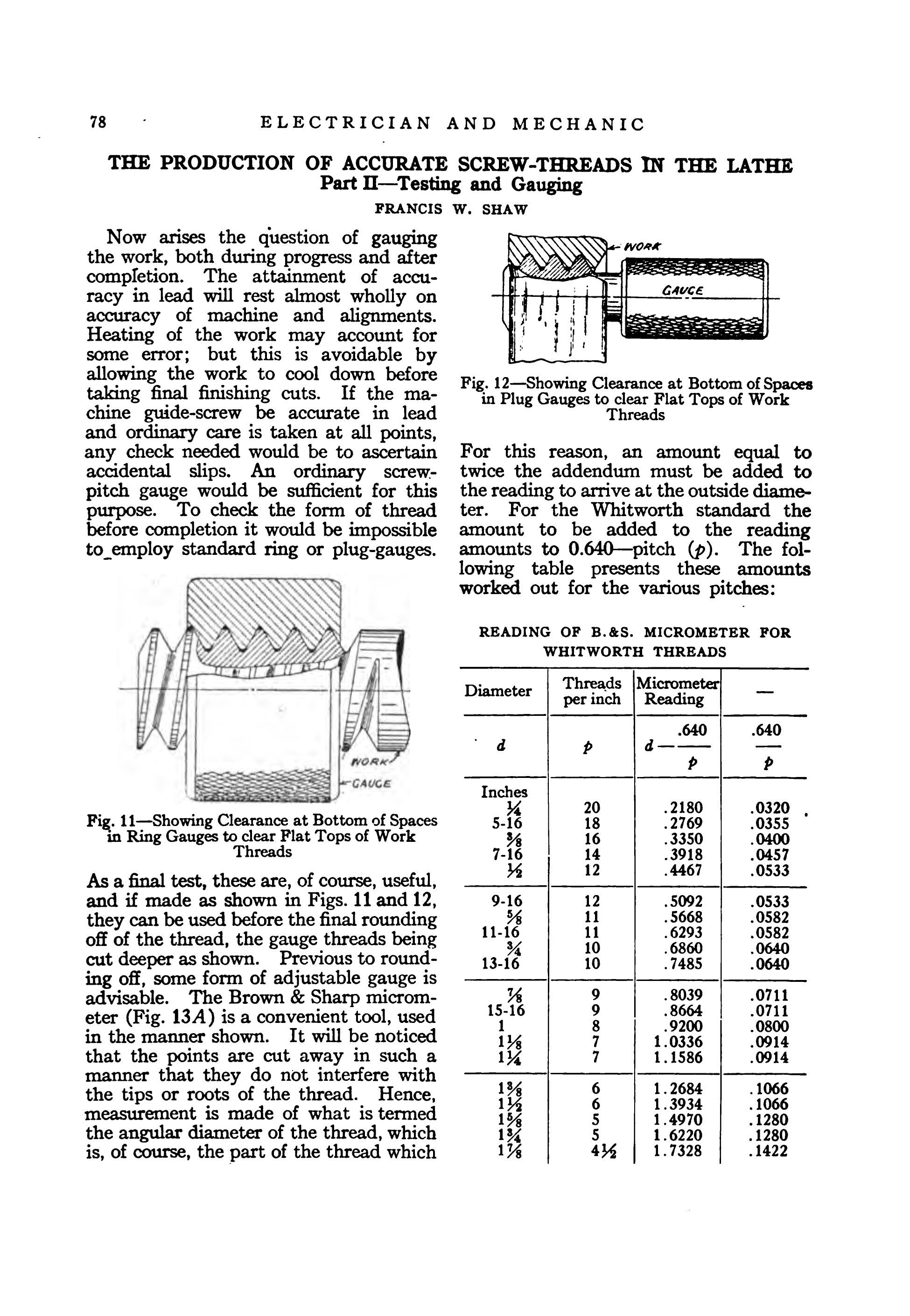
Electrician and Mechanic February 1913

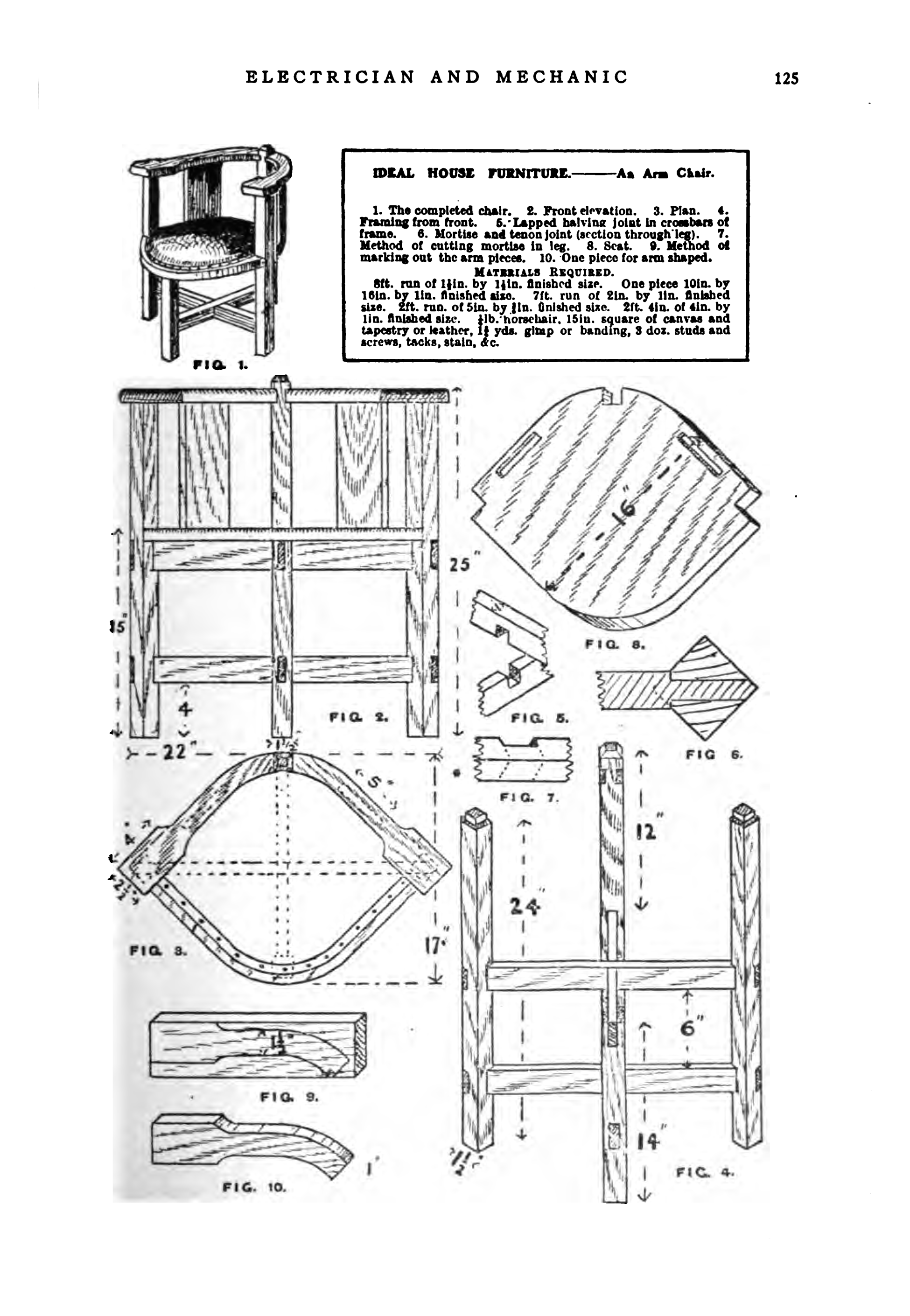
Electrician and Mechanic February 1913 Arm Chair

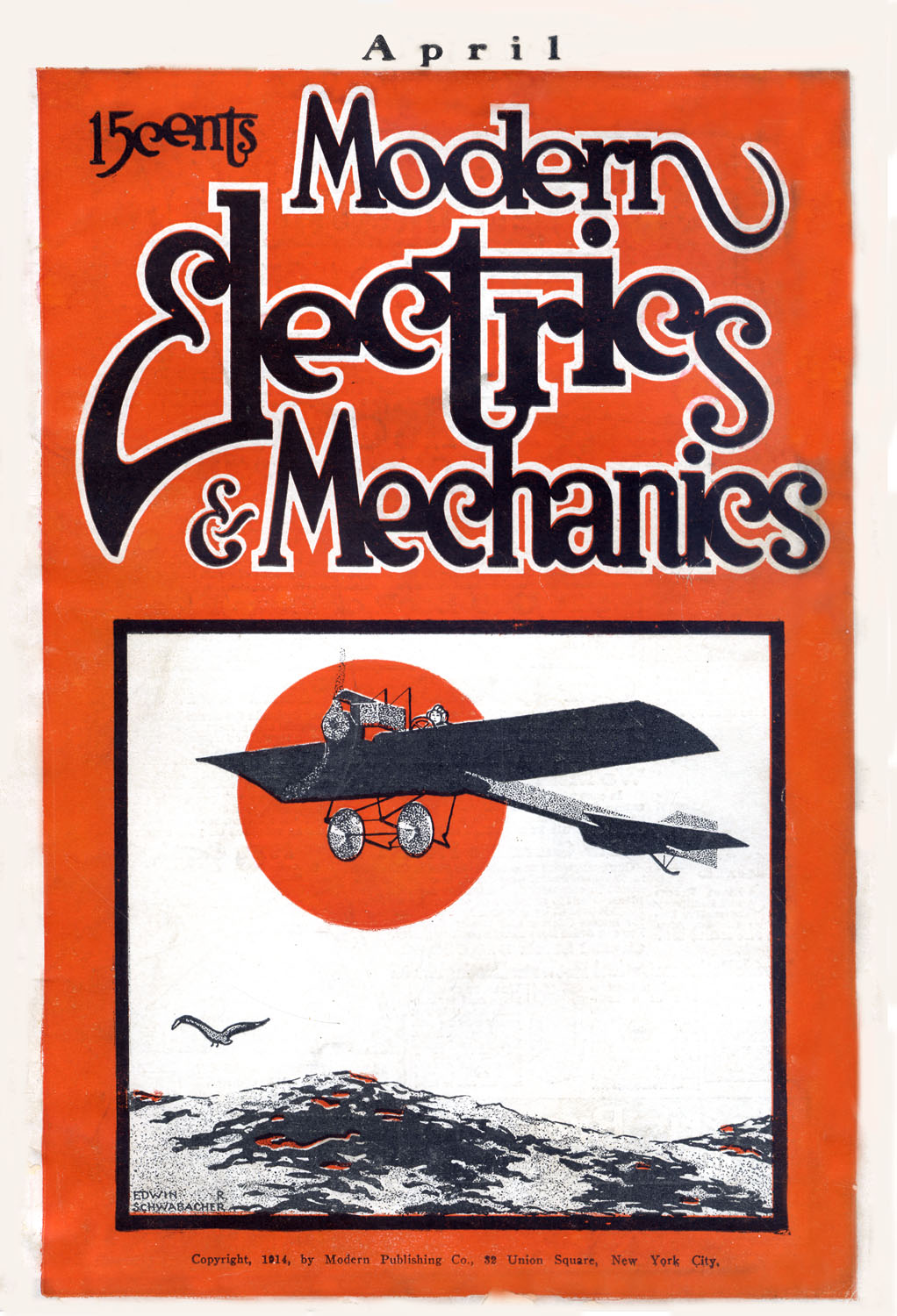
Modern Electrics and Mechanics April 1914

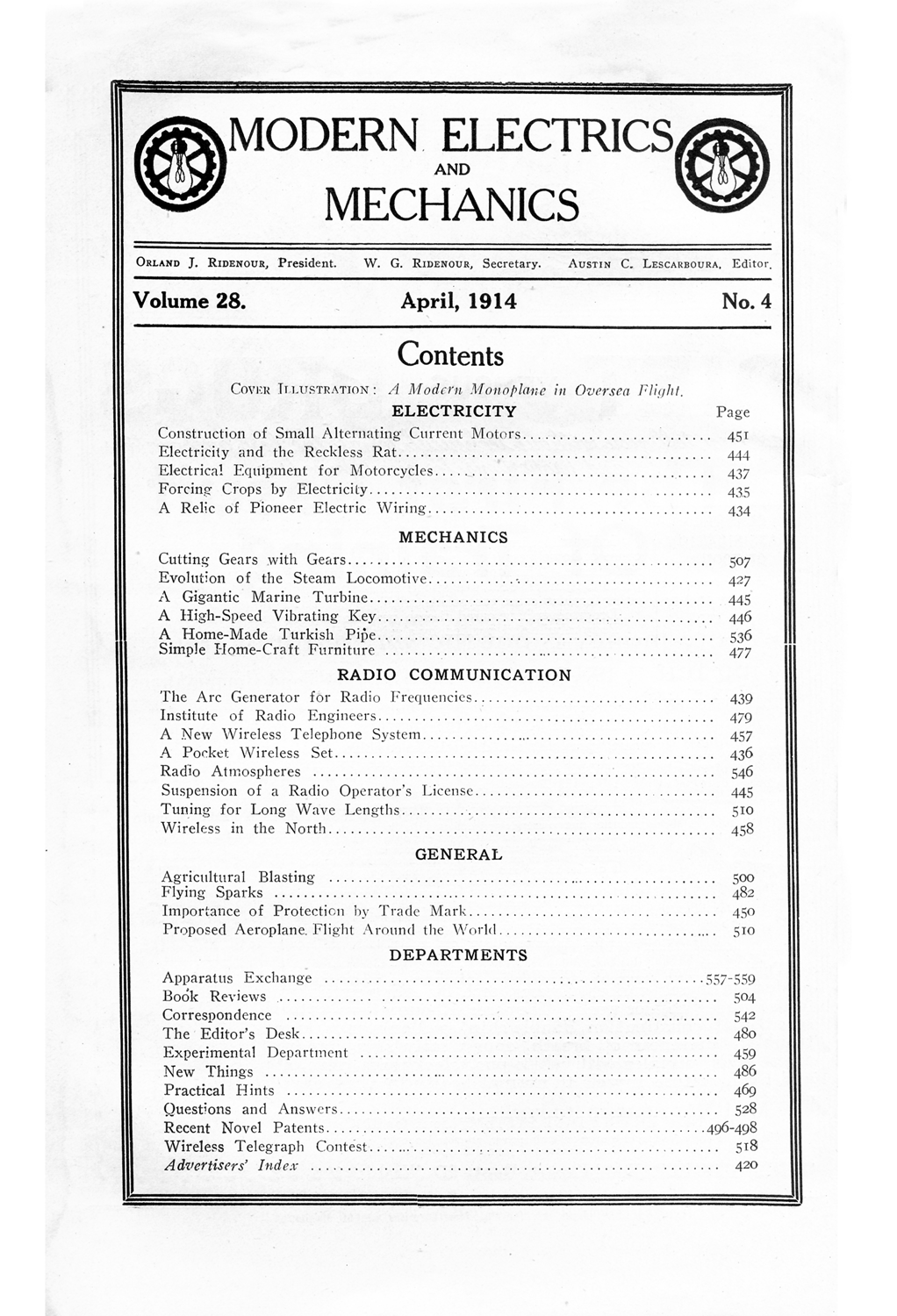
Modern Electrics and Mechanics April 1914

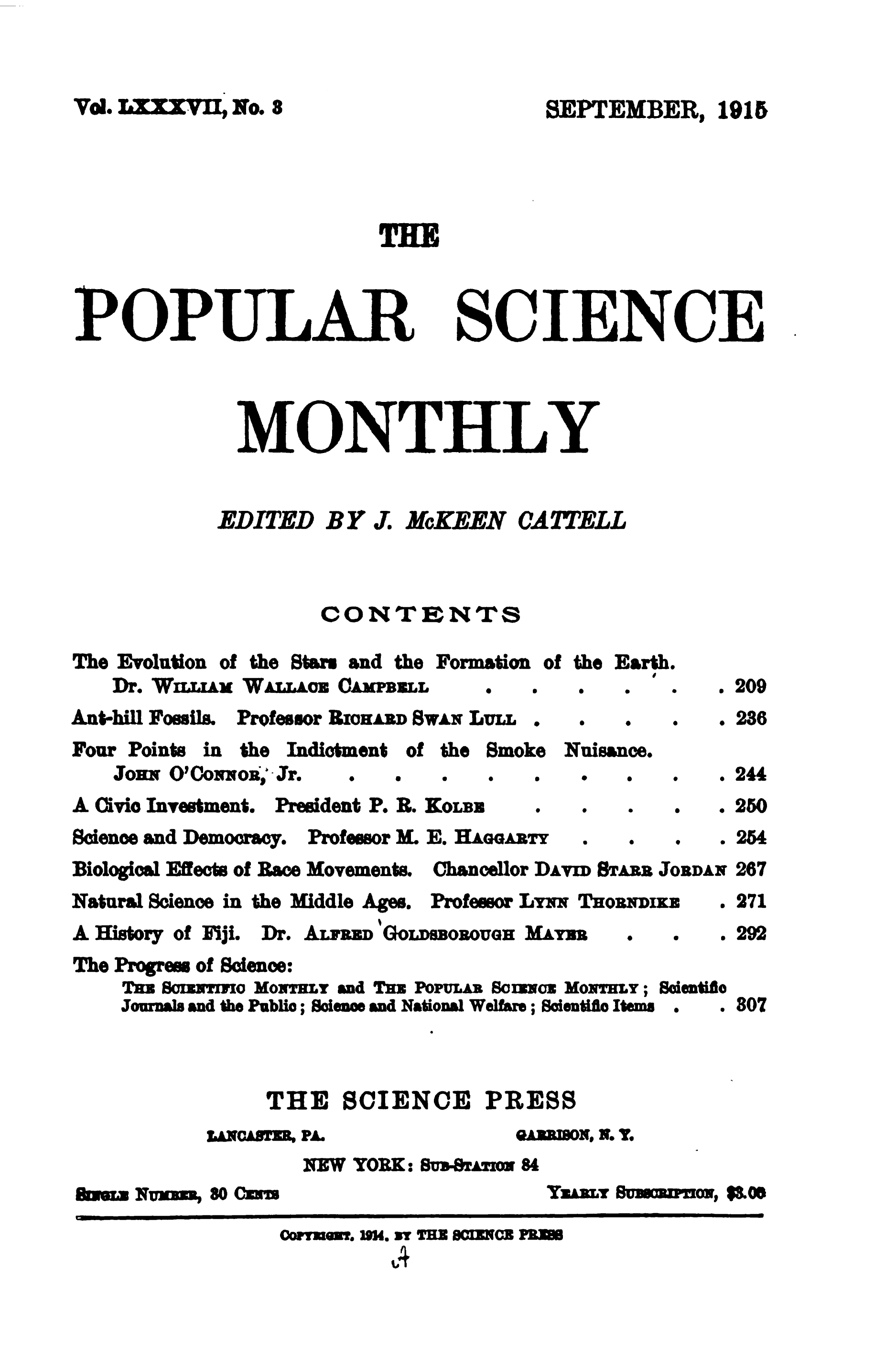
Popular Science Monthly September 1915

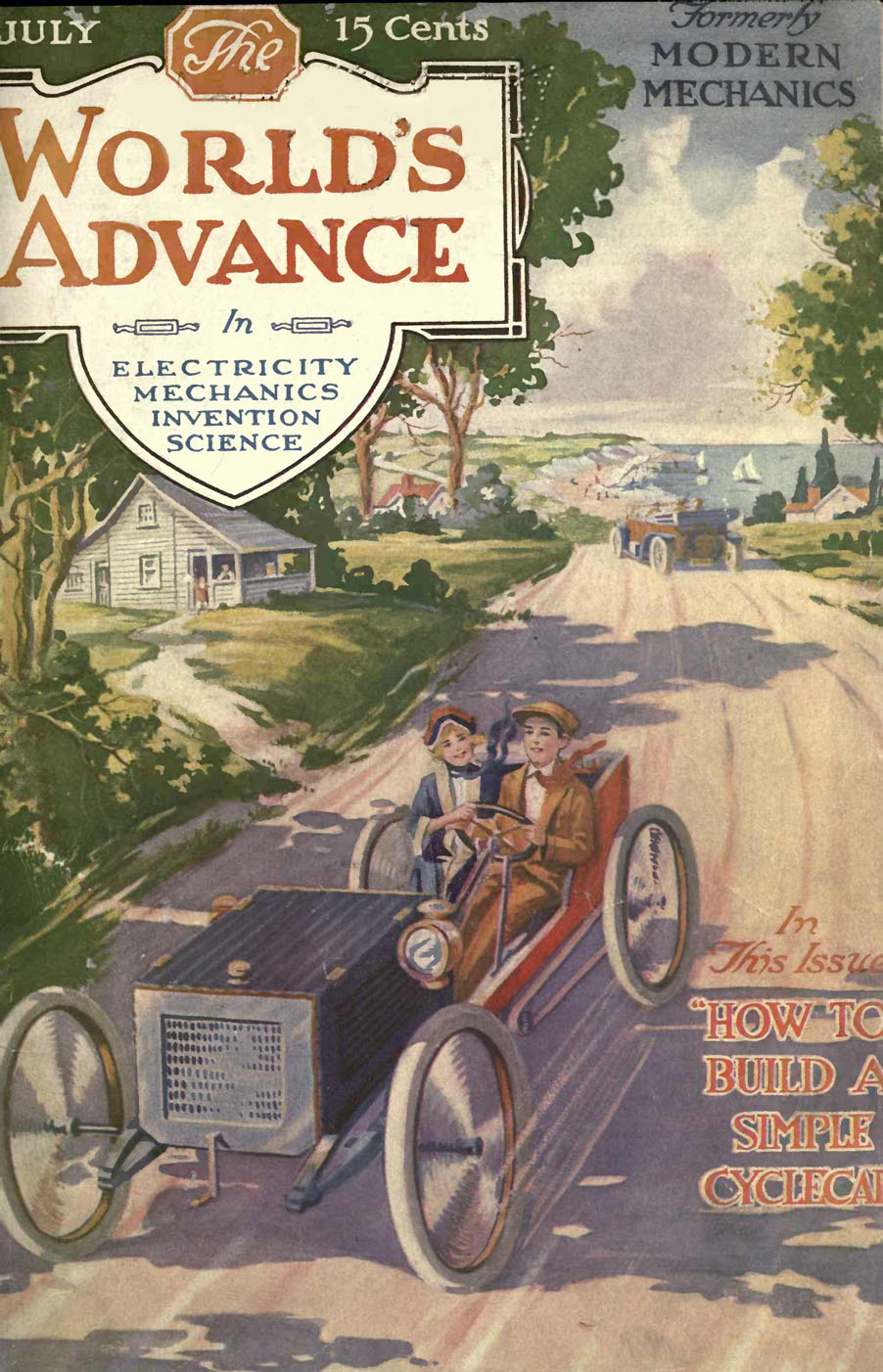
World's Advance July 1915

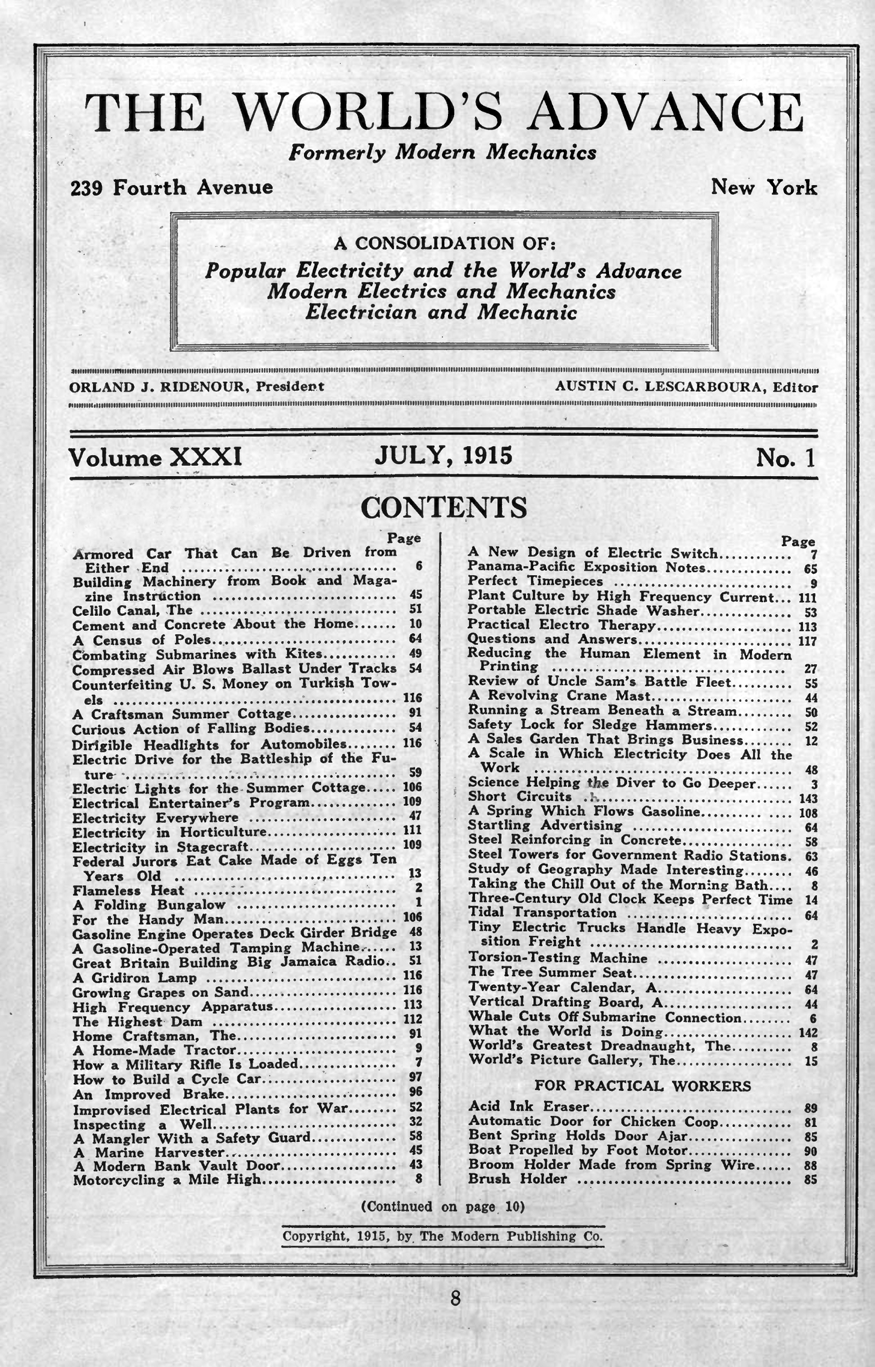
World's Advance July 1915 Contents

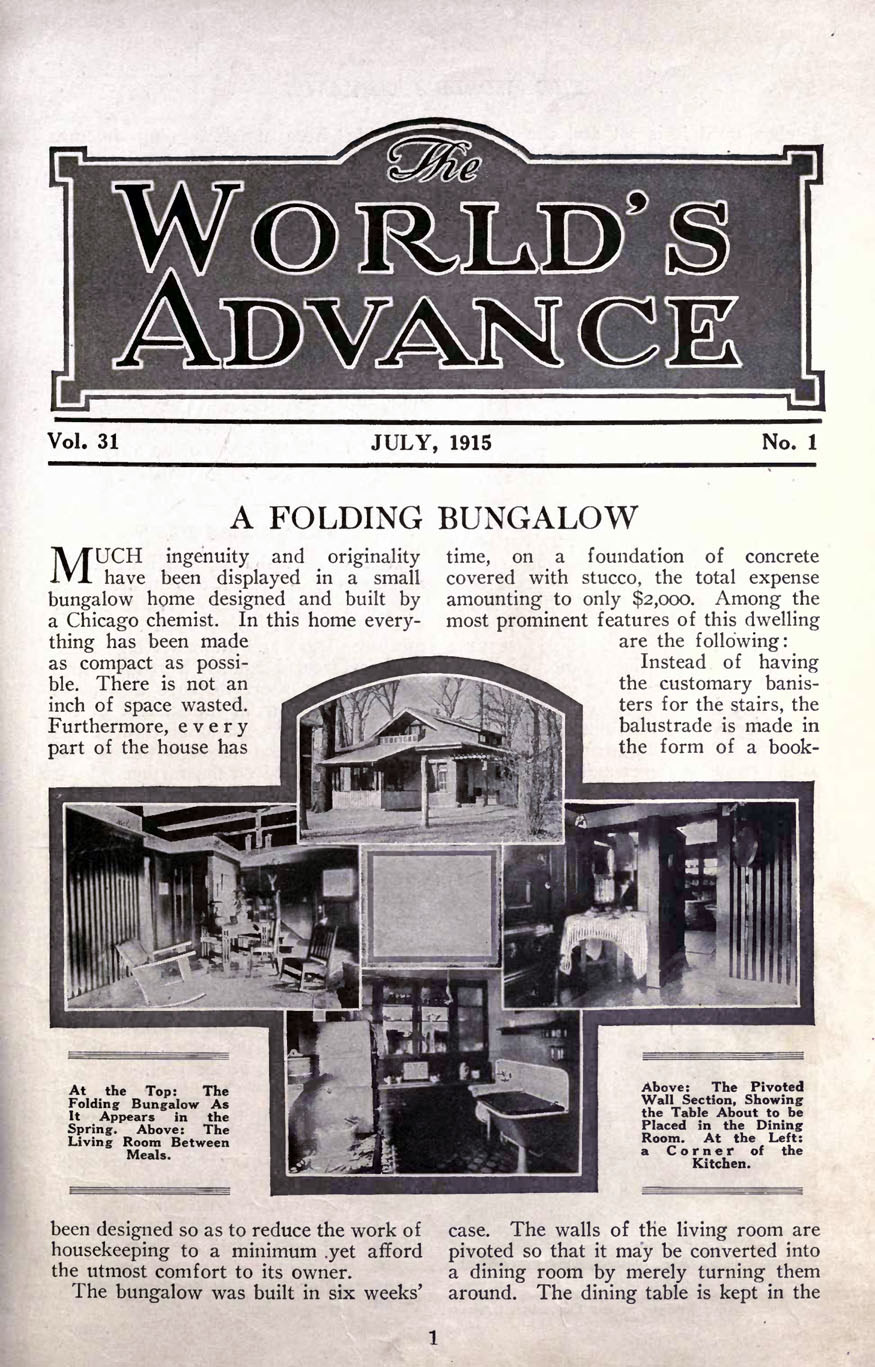
World's Advance July 1915

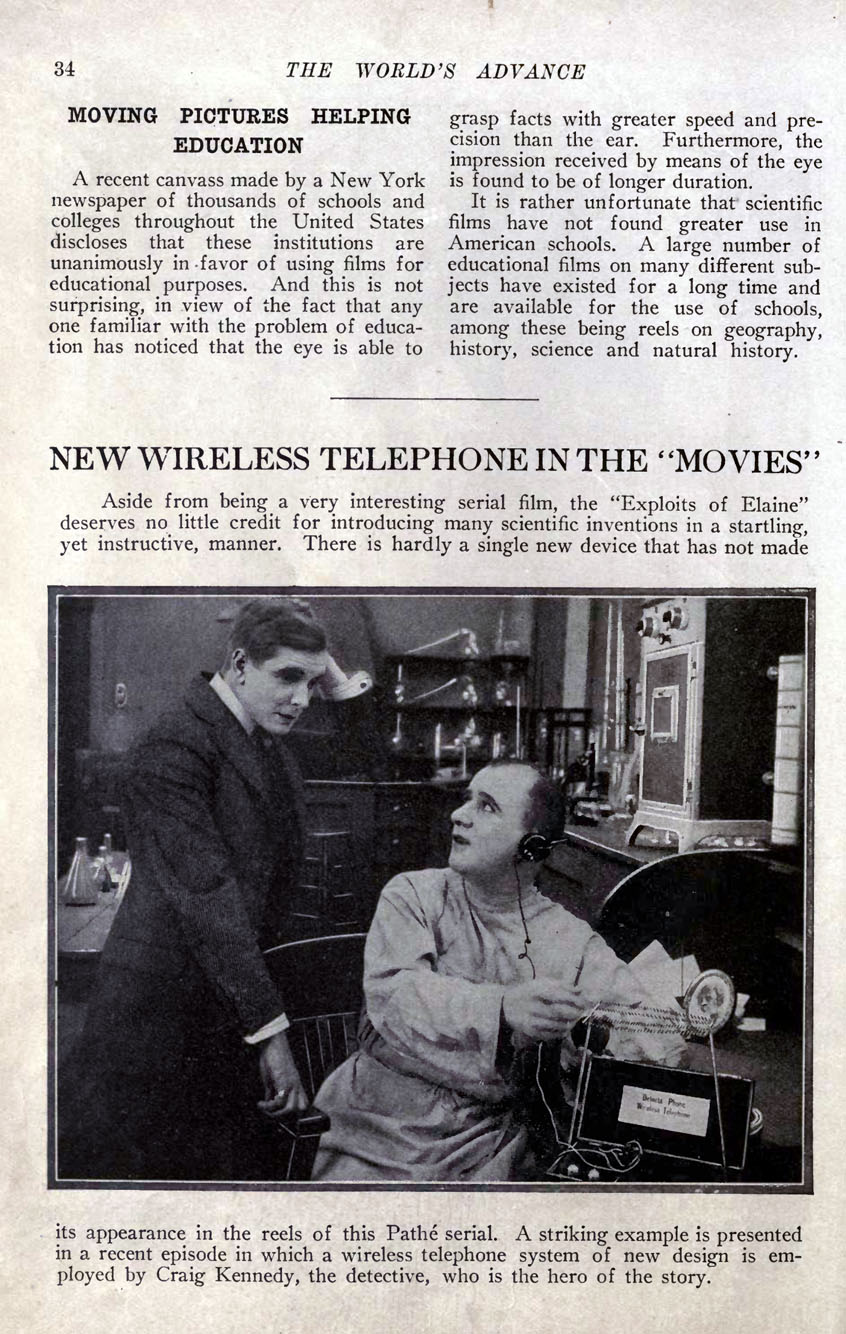
World's Advance July 1915

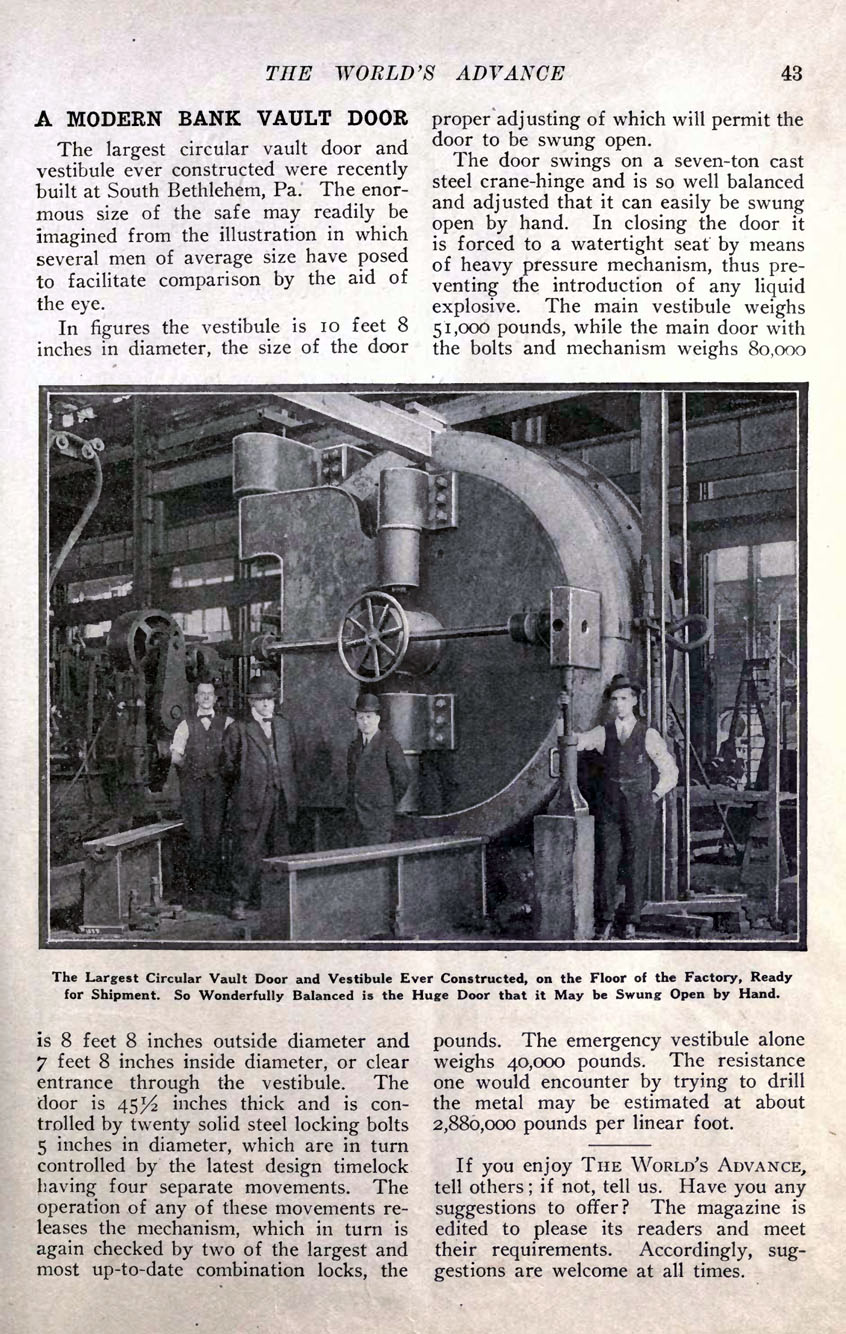
World's Advance July 1915

== Publications ==
- Electrician and Mechanic (January–June 1912) from Harvard University Library on Google Books
- Electrician and Mechanic (January–June 1913) from Harvard University Library on Google Books
- Popular Science Monthly May 1872 to September 1915 from Biodiversity Heritage Library
- Modern Mechanics and World's Advance (January–June 1915) from Prelinger Library on Internet Archive
- World's Advance (July–September 1915) from Prelinger Library on Internet Archive
- Popular Science Monthly (January–June 1918) from New York Public Library on Google Books
