= Modern Electrics =

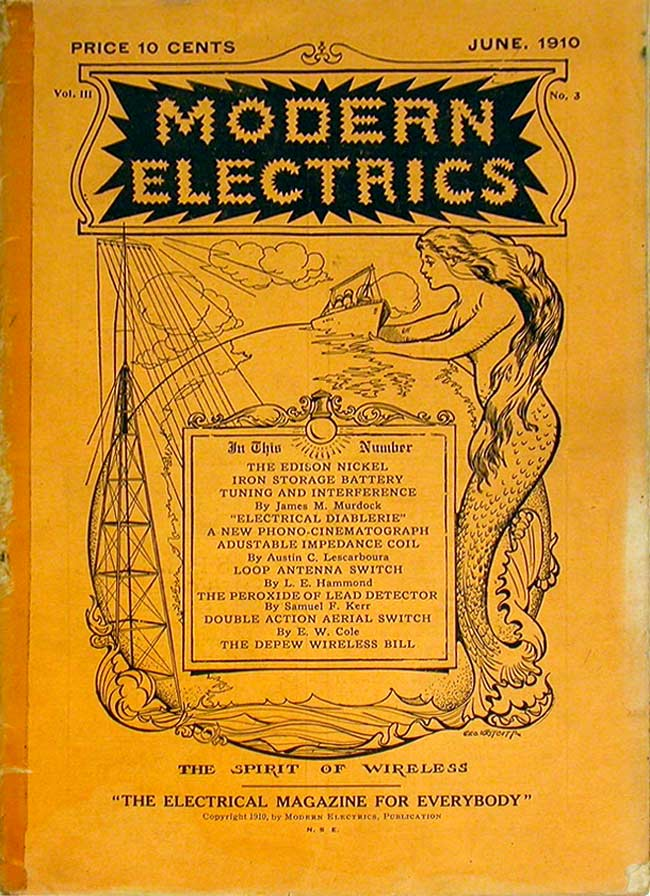
- Modern Electrics, June 1910
- Editor: Hugo Gernsback
- Categories: Amateur radio
- Frequency: Monthly
- Publisher: Hugo Gernsback
- First issue: April 1908
- Final issue: 1914
- Company: Modern Electrics Publications
- Country: USA
- Based in: New York City
- Language: English

Modern Electrics was a technical magazine for the amateur radio experimenter. The magazine existed between 1908 and 1914.

== History and profile ==
Modern Electrics was created by Hugo Gernsback and began publication in April 1908. The magazine was initially intended to provide mail-order information for radio parts and to promote the amateur radio hobby, but it later became a vehicle for technology-based fiction stories. The first fiction appeared in the April 1911 issue, and the series of 12 installments by Hugo Gernsback would later be published as the science fiction novel Ralph 124C 41+.

The circulation for this magazine increased rapidly, starting at 2,000 and increasing to 52,000 in 1911. In 1908, the magazine announced the "wireless registry", a listing of radio owners, their call letters, and the type of equipment they owned and how it was operated.

The magazine was sold in 1913, and ceased publication in 1914. It then merged with Electrician and Mechanic to become Modern Electrics and Mechanics. The experience Gernsback gained with Modern Electrics led him to introduce Electrical Experimenter magazine in 1913 and pulp science fiction magazine Amazing Stories in 1926.
