= Hugo Gernsback =

American inventor, writer, editor and publisher (1884–1967)

- Gernsback portrait by Fabian, date unknown
- Born: Hugo Gernsbacher; August 16, 1884; Luxembourg City, Luxembourg
- Died: August 19, 1967 (aged 83); New York City, U.S.
- Occupations: Inventor; magazine publisher; editor; writer
- Writing career
- Pen name: Beno Ruckshagg, Erno Shuckbagg, Grace G. Hucksnob, Grego Banshuck, Greno Gashbuck, Gus N. Habergock, Kars Gugenchob
- Period: 1911–1967 (fiction)
- Genre: Science fiction

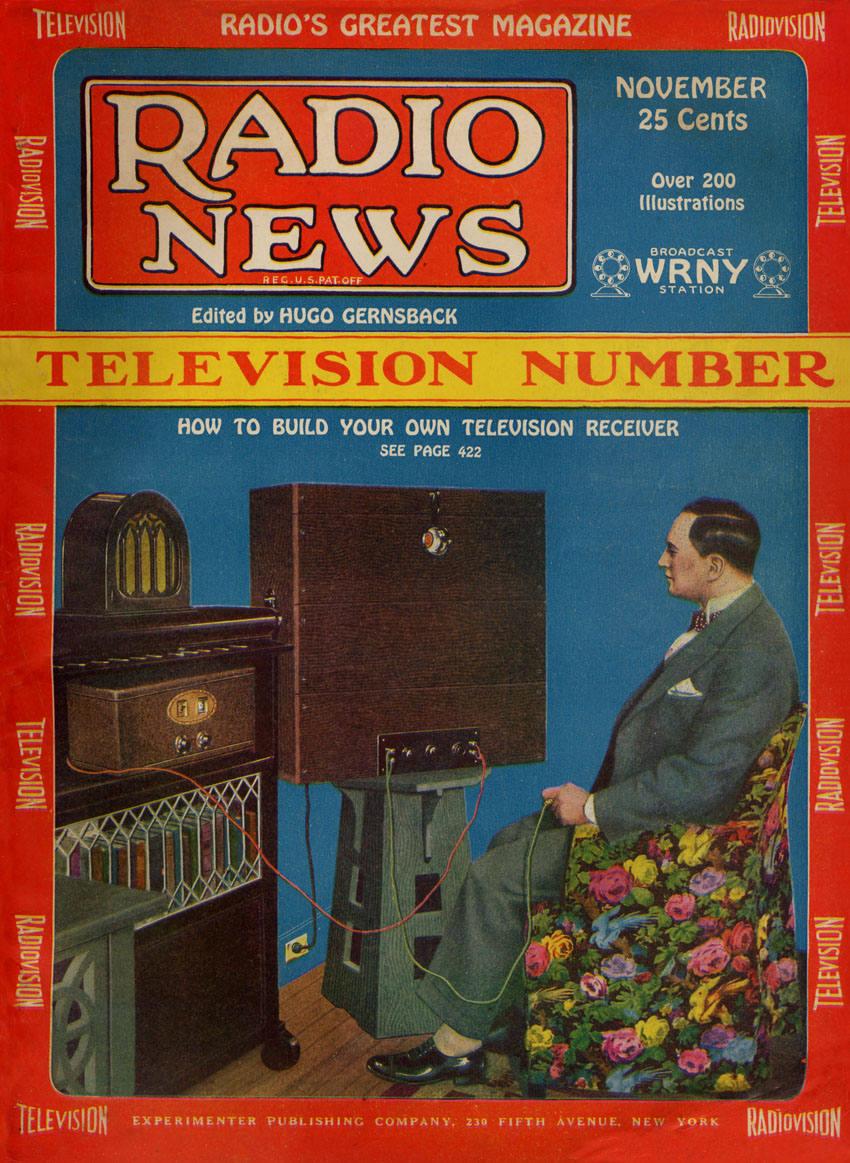
Gernsback watching a television broadcast by his station WRNY on the cover of his Radio News (November 1928)

Hugo Gernsback (/ˈɡɜːrnzbæk/; born Hugo Gernsbacher, Luxembourgish: [ˈɡɛʁnsbɑχɐ], August 16, 1884 – August 19, 1967) was a Luxembourgish American editor and magazine publisher whose publications included the first science fiction magazine, Amazing Stories. For his significant contributions to the science fiction genre as publisher, he is often referred to as "The Father of Science Fiction", along with the novelists Jules Verne and H. G. Wells. In his honor, annual awards presented at the World Science Fiction Convention are named the "Hugos".

Gernsback emigrated to the U.S. in 1904 and later became a citizen. He was also a significant figure in the electronics and radio industries, even starting a radio station, WRNY, and the world's first magazine about electronics and radio, Modern Electrics. Gernsback died in New York City in 1967.

== Personal life ==
Gernsback was born in 1884 in the Luxembourg City district of Bonnevoie, to Berta Dürlacher, a housewife, and Moritz Gernsbacher, a winemaker, and grew up on the then largely undeveloped Bourbon Plateau. His family was Jewish. Gernsback emigrated to the United States in 1904 and later became a naturalized citizen. He married three times: to Rose Harvey in 1906, Dorothy Kantrowitz in 1921, and Mary Hancher (1914–1985) in 1951. In 1925, he founded radio station WRNY, which was broadcast from the 18th floor of the Roosevelt Hotel in New York City. In 1928, WRNY aired some of the first television broadcasts. During the show, audio stopped and each artist waved or bowed onscreen. When audio resumed, they performed. Gernsback is also considered a pioneer in amateur radio.

Before helping to create science fiction, Gernsback was an entrepreneur in the electronics industry, importing radio parts from Europe to the United States and helping to popularize amateur "wireless". In April 1908 he founded Modern Electrics, the world's first magazine about both electronics and radio, called "wireless" at the time. While the cover of the magazine itself states it was a catalog, most historians note that it contained articles, features, and plotlines, qualifying it as a magazine.

Under its auspices, in January 1909, he founded the Wireless Association of America, which had 10,000 members within a year. In 1912, Gernsback said that he estimated 400,000 people in the U.S. were involved in amateur radio. In 1913, he founded a similar magazine, The Electrical Experimenter, which became Science and Invention in 1920. It was in these magazines that he began including scientific fiction stories alongside science journalism, including his novel Ralph 124C 41+, which he ran for 12 months from April 1911 in Modern Electrics.

Hugo Gernsback started the Radio News magazine for amateur radio enthusiasts in 1919.

He died at Roosevelt Hospital (Mount Sinai West as of 2020) in Manhattan, New York City on August 19, 1967, at age 83.

== Science fiction ==
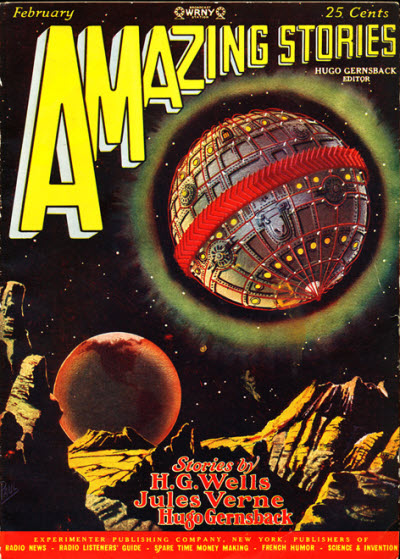
Gernsback's second novel, Baron Münchausen's Scientific Adventures, was serialized in Amazing in 1928, with the opening installment taking the February cover.

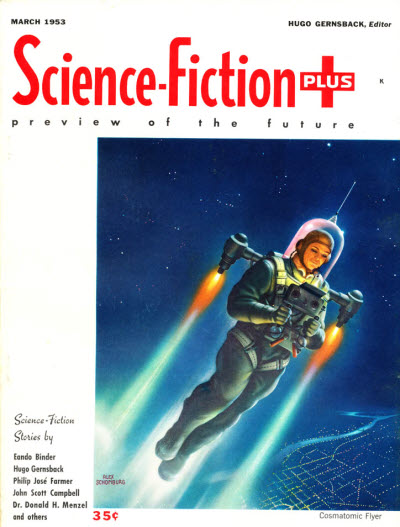
Gernsback's short story "The Cosmatomic Flyer", under the byline "Greno Gashbuck," was cover-featured in the debut issue of Gernsback's Science-Fiction Plus in 1953.

Gernsback provided a forum for the modern genre of science fiction in 1926 by founding the first magazine dedicated to it, Amazing Stories. The inaugural April issue comprised a one-page editorial and reissues of six stories, three less than ten years old and three by Poe, Verne, and Wells. (Note: The first eight monthly issues included installments of at least one Verne story and for more than two years every one featured a Wells story.) He said he became interested in the concept after reading a translation of the work of Percival Lowell as a child. His idea of a perfect science fiction story was "75 percent literature interwoven with 25 percent science".

As an editor, he valued the goal of scientific accuracy in science fiction stories: "Not only did Gernsback establish a panel of experts——all reputable professionals from universities, museums, and institutes—to pass judgment on the accuracy of the science; he also encouraged his writers to elaborate on the scientific details they employed in their stories, comment on the impossibilities in each other's stories, and even offered his readers prize money for identifying scientific errors." He also played an important role in starting science fiction fandom, by organizing the Science Fiction League and by publishing the addresses of people who wrote letters to his magazines. Fans began to organize, and became aware of themselves as a movement, a social force; this was probably decisive for the subsequent history of the genre.

Gernsback created his preferred term for the emerging genre, "scientifiction", in 1916. He is sometimes also credited with coining "science fiction" in 1929 in the preface of the first Science Wonder Stories, although instances of "science-fiction" (mostly, but not always, hyphenated) have been found as far back as 1851, and the preface itself makes no mention of it being a new term.

In 1929, he lost ownership of his first magazines after a bankruptcy lawsuit. There is some debate about whether this process was genuine, manipulation by publisher Bernarr Macfadden, or a Gernsback scheme to begin another company. After losing control of Amazing Stories, Gernsback founded two new science fiction magazines, Science Wonder Stories and Air Wonder Stories. A year later, due to Depression-era financial troubles, the two were merged into Wonder Stories, which Gernsback continued to publish until 1936, when it was sold to Thrilling Publications and renamed Thrilling Wonder Stories. Gernsback returned in 1952–53 with Science-Fiction Plus.

Gernsback was noted for sharp, sometimes shady, business practices, and for paying his writers extremely low fees or not paying them at all. H. P. Lovecraft and Clark Ashton Smith referred to him as "Hugo the Rat".

Barry Malzberg has said:

Gernsback's venality and corruption, his sleaziness and his utter disregard for the financial rights of authors, have been well documented and discussed in critical and fan literature. That the founder of genre science fiction who gave his name to the field's most prestigious award and who was the Guest of Honor at the 1952 Worldcon was pretty much a crook (and a contemptuous crook who stiffed his writers but paid himself $100K a year as President of Gernsback Publications) has been clearly established.

Jack Williamson, who had to hire an attorney associated with the American Fiction Guild to force Gernsback to pay him, summed up his importance for the genre:

At any rate, his main influence in the field was simply to start Amazing and Wonder Stories and get SF out to the public newsstands—and to name the genre he had earlier called "scientifiction."

== Fiction ==
Frederik Pohl said in 1965 that Gernsback's Amazing Stories published "the kind of stories Gernsback himself used to write: a sort of animated catalogue of gadgets". Gernsback's fiction includes the novel Ralph 124C 41+; the title is a pun on the phrase "one to foresee for many" ("one plus"). Even though Ralph 124C 41+ has been described as pioneering many ideas and themes found in later SF work, it has often been neglected due to what most critics deem poor artistic quality. Author Brian Aldiss called the story a "tawdry illiterate tale" and a "sorry concoction", while author and editor Lester del Rey called it "simply dreadful." While most other modern critics have little positive to say about the story's writing, Ralph 124C 41+ is considered by science fiction critic Gary Westfahl as "essential text for all studies of science fiction."

Gernsback's second novel, Baron Münchausen's Scientific Adventures, was serialized in Amazing Stories in 1928.

Gernsback's third (and final) novel, Ultimate World, written c. 1958, was not published until 1971. Lester del Rey described it simply as "a bad book", marked more by routine social commentary than by scientific insight or extrapolation. James Blish, in a caustic review, described the novel as "incompetent, pedantic, graceless, incredible, unpopulated and boring" and concluded that its publication "accomplishes nothing but the placing of a blot on the memory of a justly honored man."

Gernsback combined his fiction and science into Everyday Science and Mechanics magazine, serving as the editor in the 1930s.

== Legacy ==
In 1954, Gernsback was awarded an Officer of Luxembourg's Order of the Oak Crown, an honor equivalent to being knighted.

The Hugo Awards or "Hugos" are the annual achievement awards presented at the World Science Fiction Convention, selected in a process that ends with vote by current Convention members. They originated and acquired the "Hugo" nickname during the 1950s and were formally defined as a convention responsibility under the name "Science Fiction Achievement Awards" early in the 1960s. The nickname soon became almost universal and its use legally protected; "Hugo Award(s)" replaced the longer name in all official uses after the 1991 cycle.

In 1960 Gernsback received a special Hugo Award as "The Father of Magazine Science Fiction".

The Science Fiction and Fantasy Hall of Fame inducted him in 1996, its inaugural class of two deceased and two living persons.

Science fiction author Brian W. Aldiss held a contrary view about Gernsback's contributions: "It is easy to argue that Hugo Gernsback ... was one of the worst disasters to hit the science fiction field ... Gernsback himself was utterly without any literary understanding. He created dangerous precedents which many later editors in the field followed."

Gernsback made significant contributions to the growth of early broadcasting, mostly through his efforts as a publisher. He originated the industry of specialized publications for radio with Modern Electrics and Electrical Experimenter. Later on, and more influentially, he published Radio News, which would have the largest readership among radio magazines in radio broadcasting's formative years. He edited Radio News until 1929. For a short time he hired John F. Rider to be editor. Rider was a former engineer working with the US Army Signal Corps and a radio engineer for Alfred H. Grebe, a radio manufacturer. However, Rider would soon leave Gernsback and form his own publishing company, John F. Rider Publisher, New York around 1931.

Gernsback made use of the magazine to promote his interests, including having his radio station's call letters on the cover starting in 1925. WRNY and Radio News were used to cross-promote each other, with programs on his station often used to discuss articles he had published, and articles in the magazine often covering program activities at WRNY. He also advocated for future directions in innovation and regulation of radio. The magazine contained many drawings and diagrams, encouraging radio listeners of the 1920s to experiment themselves to improve the technology. WRNY was often used as a laboratory to see if various radio inventions were worthwhile.

Articles that were published about television were also tested in this manner when the radio station was used to send pictures to experimental television receivers in August 1928. The technology, however, required sending sight and sound one after the other rather than sending both at the same time, as WRNY only broadcast on one channel. Such experiments were expensive, eventually contributing to Gernsback's Experimenter Publishing Company going into bankruptcy in 1929. WRNY was sold to Aviation Radio, who maintained the channel part-time to broadcast aviation weather reports and related feature programs. Along with other stations sharing the same frequency, it was acquired by Metro-Goldwyn-Mayer and consolidated into that company's WHN in 1934.

== Patents and inventions ==
Gernsback held 80 patents by the time of his death in New York City on August 19, 1967.

His first patent was a new method for manufacturing dry cell batteries, a patent applied for on June 28, 1906, and granted February 5, 1907.

Among his inventions are a combined electric hair brush and comb (U.S. patent 1,016,138), 1912; an ear cushion (U.S. patent 1,514,152) in 1927; and a hydraulic fishery (U.S. patent 2,718,083), in 1955.

Gernsback published a work entitled Music for the Deaf in The Electrical Experimenter describing the Physiophone, a device which converted audio into electrical impulses that could be detected by humans. He advocated this device as a method for allowing the deaf to experience music.

Other patents held by Gernsback are related to: Incandescent Lamp, Electrorheostat Regulator, Electro Adjustable Condenser, Detectorium, Relay, Potentiometer, Electrolytic Interrupter, Rotary Variable Condenser, Luminous Electric Mirror, Transmitter, Postal Card, Telephone Headband, Electromagnetic Sounding Device, Submersible Amusement Device, The Isolator, Apparatus for Landing Flying Machines, Tuned Telephone Receiver, Electric Valve, Detector, Acoustic Apparatus, Electrically Operated Fountain, Cord Terminal, Coil Mounting, Radio Horn, Variable Condenser, Switch, Telephone Receiver, Crystal Detector, Process for Mounting Inductances, Depilator, Code Learner's Instrument.

== Bibliography ==
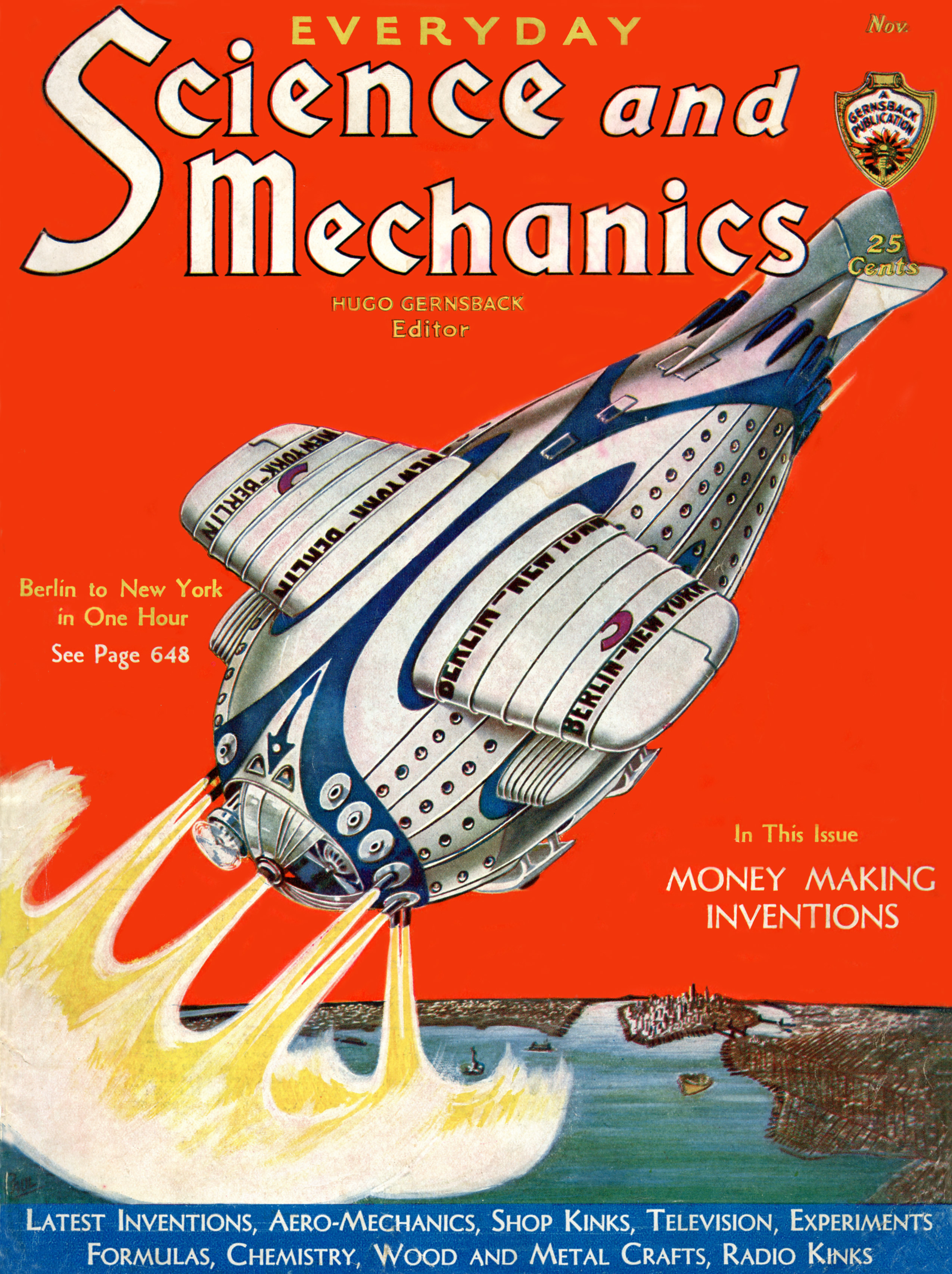
November 1931 issue of Everyday Science and Mechanics

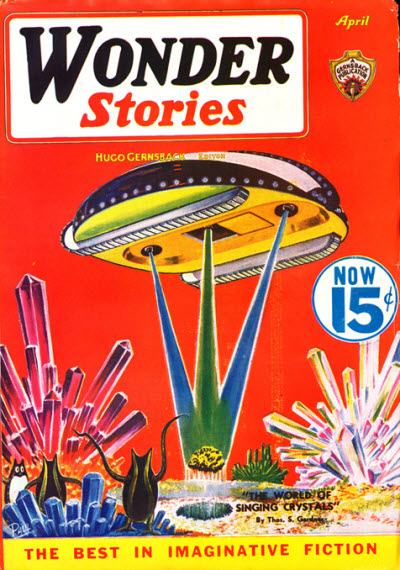
The final issue of Wonder Stories in 1936.

Novels:

- Ralph 124C 41+ (1911)
- Baron Münchausen's Scientific Adventures (1928)
- Ultimate World (1971)

Short stories:

- "The Electric Duel" (1927)
- "The Killing Flash (fr)" (1929)
- "The Cosmatomic Flyer" Science-Fiction Plus (March 1953)

Magazines edited or published:

- Air Wonder Stories – July 1929 to May 1930, merged with Science Wonder Stories to form Wonder Stories
- Amazing Detective Stories
- Amazing Stories
- Aviation Mechanics
- Electrical Experimenter – 1913 to 1920; became Science and Invention
- Everyday Mechanics – from 1929; changed to Everyday Science and Mechanics as of October 1931 issue
- Everyday Science and Mechanics – see Science and Mechanics
- The Experimenter – originally Practical Electrics, the first issue under this title was November 1924; merged into Science and Invention in 1926
- Facts of Life
- Flight
- Fotocraft
- French Humor – became Tidbits
- Gadgets
- High Seas Adventures
- Know Yourself
- Life Guide
- Light
- Luz
- Milady
- Modern Electrics – 1908 to 1914 (sold in 1913; new owners merged it with Electrician and Mechanic)
- Moneymaking
- Motor Camper & Tourist
- New Ideas for Everybody
- Pirate Stories
- Popular Medicine
- Popular Microscopy – at least thru May–June 1935 (vol 1 #6)
- Practical Electrics – Dec. 1921 to Oct. 1924, became The Experimenter
- Radio Amateur News – July 1919 to July 1920, dropped the word "amateur" and became just Radio News
- Radio and Television
- Radio-Craft — July 1929 to September 1948, became Radio-Electronics
- Radio-Electronics — October 1948 to June 1992, became Electronics Now
- Radio Electronics Weekly Business Letter
- Radio Listeners Guide and Call Book [title varies]
- Radio News — July 1919 (as Radio Amateur News) to July 1948
- Radio Program Weekly
- Radio Review
- Science and Invention – formerly Electrical Experimenter; published August 1920 to August 1931
- Science and Mechanics – originally Everyday Mechanics; changed to Everyday Science and Mechanics in 1931. "Everyday" dropped as March 1937 issue, and published as Science and Mechanics until 1976
- Science Fiction Plus – March to Dec. 1953
- Science Wonder Stories – June 1929 to May 1930, merged with Air Wonder Stories to form Wonder Stories
- Science Wonder Quarterly – Fall 1929 to Spring 1930, renamed Wonder Stories Quarterly and continuing to Winter 1933
- Scientific Detective Monthly
- Sexologia
- Sexology
- Short-Wave and Television
- Short-Wave Craft – merged into Radio-Craft
- Short-Wave Listener
- Superworld Comics
- Technocracy Review
- Television – 1928
- Television News – March 1931 to October 1932; merged into Radio Review, then into Radio News as of March 1933
- Tidbits, originally French Humor
- Woman's Digest
- Wonder Stories – June 1930 to April 1936
- Your Body
- Your Dreams

== See also ==
- List of science fiction editors
- Pulp magazine
