= The Isolator (helmet) =

Distraction-reducing helmet

"The Isolator" helmet

The Isolator was a helmet created by Hugo Gernsback in 1925 to reduce distractions.

The Isolator was first introduced in the July 1925 edition of the American Physical Society magazine, with which Gernsback was affiliated. The helmet was first created using wood and felt. The mouth of the helmet had a baffle for breathing and had three pieces of glass so that users could see outside. It was deemed successful, but Gernsback had estimated that it was only "75%" efficient and said it did not keep out all sounds. Gernsback re-designed the device without wood and cut white lines into the glass so users could see out of the helmet. Gernsback said that the new design was 90–95% efficient and kept out almost all sounds. However, Gernsback also noted that the helmet could only be worn for about 15 minutes at a time as the user would become drowsy. Gernsback then added an oxygen tank to assist the user with breathing while wearing the helmet.

Gernsback later patented "The Isolator". While he had deemed the item to be a "great investment", the item had disappeared by 1926 after only eleven helmets were created.

The Isolator later inspired the Helmfon, another noise-blocking helmet.
