= Sleep and learning =

Multiple hypotheses explain the possible connections between sleep and learning in humans. Research indicates that sleep does more than allow the brain to rest; it may also aid the consolidation of long-term memories.

REM sleep and slow-wave sleep play different roles in memory consolidation. REM is associated with the consolidation of nondeclarative (implicit) memories. An example of a nondeclarative memory would be a task we can do without consciously thinking about, such as riding a bike. Slow-wave, or non-REM (NREM) sleep, consolidates declarative (explicit) memories. These are facts that need to be consciously remembered, such as dates for a history class.

== Increased learning ==
Popular sayings can reflect the notion that remolded memories produce new creative associations in the morning, and that performance often improves after a time-interval that includes sleep. Current studies demonstrate that a healthy sleep produces a significant learning-dependent performance boost. The idea is that sleep helps the brain to edit its memory, looking for important patterns and extracting overarching rules which could be described as 'the gist', and integrating this with existing memory. The 'synaptic scaling' hypothesis suggests that sleep plays an important role in regulating learning that has taken place while awake, enabling more efficient and effective storage in the brain, making better use of space and energy.

Healthy sleep must include the appropriate sequence and proportion of NREM and REM phases, which play different roles in the memory consolidation-optimization process. During a normal night of sleep, a person will alternate between periods of NREM and REM sleep. Each cycle is approximately 90 minutes long, containing a 20-30 minute bout of REM sleep. NREM sleep consists of sleep stages 1–4, and is where movement can be observed. A person can still move their body when they are in NREM sleep. If someone sleeping turns, tosses, or rolls over, this indicates that they are in NREM sleep. REM sleep is characterized by the lack of muscle activity. Physiological studies have shown that aside from the occasional twitch, a person actually becomes paralyzed during REM sleep. In motor skill learning, an interval of sleep may be critical for the expression of performance gains; without sleep these gains will be delayed.

Procedural memories are a form of nondeclarative memory, so they would most benefit from the fast-wave REM sleep. In a study, procedural memories have been shown to benefit from sleep. Subjects were tested using a tapping task, where they used their fingers to tap a specific sequence of numbers on a keyboard, and their performances were measured by accuracy and speed. This finger-tapping task was used to simulate learning a motor skill. The first group was tested, retested 12 hours later while awake, and finally tested another 12 hours later with sleep in between. The other group was tested, retested 12 hours later with sleep in between, and then retested 12 hours later while awake. The results showed that in both groups, there was only a slight improvement after a 12-hour wake session, but a significant increase in performance after each group slept. This study gives evidence that REM sleep is a significant factor in consolidating motor skill procedural memories, therefore sleep deprivation can impair performance on a motor learning task. This memory decrement results specifically from the loss of stage 2, REM sleep.

Declarative memory has also been shown to benefit from sleep, but not in the same way as procedural memory. Declarative memories benefit from the slow-waves nREM sleep. A study was conducted where the subjects learned word pairs, and the results showed that sleep not only prevents the decay of memory, but also actively fixates declarative memories. Two of the groups learned word pairs, then either slept or stayed awake, and were tested again. The other two groups did the same thing, except they also learned interference pairs right before being retested to try to disrupt the previously learned word pairs. The results showed that sleep was of some help in retaining the word pair associations, while against the interference pair, sleep helped significantly.

After sleep, there is increased insight. This is because sleep helps people to reanalyze their memories. The same patterns of brain activity that occur during learning have been found to occur again during sleep, only faster. One way that sleep strengthens memories is by weeding out the less successful connections between neurons in the brain. This weeding out is essential to prevent overactivity. The brain compensates for strengthening some synapses (connections) between neurons, by weakening others. The weakening process occurs mostly during sleep. This weakening during sleep allows for strengthening of other connections while we are awake. Learning is the process of strengthening connections, therefore this process could be a major explanation for the benefits that sleep has on memory.

Research has shown that taking an afternoon nap increases learning capacity. A study tested two groups of subjects on a nondeclarative memory task. One group engaged in REM sleep, and one group did not (meaning that they engaged in NREM sleep). The investigators found that the subjects who engaged only in NREM sleep did not show much improvement. The subjects who engaged in REM sleep performed significantly better, indicating that REM sleep facilitated the consolidation of nondeclarative memories. A more recent study demonstrated that a procedural task was learned and retained better if it was encountered immediately before going to sleep, while a declarative task was learned better in the afternoon.

== Electrophysiological evidence in rats ==
A 2009 study based on electrophysiological recordings of large ensembles of isolated cells in the prefrontal cortex of rats revealed that cell assemblies that formed upon learning were more preferentially active during subsequent sleep episodes. More specifically, those replay events were more prominent during slow wave sleep and were concomitant with hippocampal reactivation events. This study has shown that neuronal patterns in large brain networks are tagged during learning so that they are replayed, and supposedly consolidated, during subsequent sleep. There have been other studies that have shown similar reactivation of learning pattern during motor skill and neuroprosthetic learning. Notably, new evidence is showing that reactivation and rescaling may be co-occurring during sleep.

== Sleep in relation to school and the workplace ==
Sleep has been directly linked to the grades of students. One in four U.S. high school students admit to falling asleep in class at least once a week. Consequently, results have shown that those who sleep less do poorly. In the United States, sleep deprivation is common with students because almost all schools begin early in the morning and many of these students either choose to stay awake late into the night or cannot do otherwise due to delayed sleep phase syndrome. As a result, students that should be getting between 8.5 and 9.25 hours of sleep are getting only 7 hours. Perhaps because of this sleep deprivation, their grades are lower and their concentration is impaired.

Research shows that different remote learning modalities significantly affect nursing students' perceptions of their sleep quality. During the COVID-19 pandemic, a study found that students engaged in asynchronous learning reported better sleep quality compared to those in hybrid or in-person learning environments. Over half of the nursing students surveyed reported getting less than the recommended 7 hours of sleep per night; however, students who reported more sleep hours also reported better sleep quality.

Given the significant impact of sleep deprivation on academic performance and the differing sleep patterns observed in students, educational institutions have begun to reconsider start times. For instance, a school in New Zealand changed its start time to 10:30 a.m. in 2006, to allow students to keep to a schedule that allowed more sleep. In 2009, Monkseaton High School, in North Tyneside, had 800 pupils aged 13–19 starting lessons at 10 a.m. instead of the normal 9 a.m. and reported that general absence dropped by 8% and persistent absenteeism by 27%. In 2024, some 20 schools in Denmark have pushed back their start times, and there have been positive results.

College students represent one of the most sleep-deprived segments of the population. Only 11% of American college students sleep well, and 40% of students feel well rested only two days per week. About 73% have experienced at least some occasional sleep issues. This poor sleep is thought to have a severe impact on their ability to learn and remember information because the brain is being deprived of time that it needs to consolidate information which is essential to the learning process.

Sleep has also been directly linked to performance in the workplace. Different sleep stages may also play a role in learning strategies and as a result, cognitive performance. In fact one research study examined a group of sixty-seven healthy adults (18-39 years old), and found that through implementing reward based methods of model-based learning and model-free learning, model-based learning was more improved with higher amounts of REM sleep.

Model-based learning refers to a more complex mindset where planning ahead is required, whereas model-free learning describes behavior based on repetition. In the case of this study, model-based learning was improved with more REM sleep, meaning that more complex cognitive tasks could be performed. Overall, this study portrays how REM sleep is efficient and possibly even required in professional environments.

In fact, performance in more complex workplaces can be hindered due to sleep restriction. Furthermore, another study examined other published studies that assessed Elite Cognitive Performers (ECPs), like athletes and pilots, and found that sleep restriction (SR) negatively affected low-salience tasks and that more complex tasks were maintained. This study further supports the idea that sleep restriction alters performance levels to a certain degree, which can pose certain threats to specific, high-salience tasks.

In general, both studies show how workplace performance and learning can be negatively altered due to a lack of adequate sleep. Sleep as a whole affects a person’s ability to perform throughout daily life, whether that be in school or in the workplace.

The recent research that has been shown on sleep restriction and as well as irregular sleep can have a tremendous impact on teenagers cognitive function and also academic performances. Campbell et al. (2024) found out that restricting teenagers' time in bed to seven hours was linked to difficulties to attention and cognitive flexibility, although working memory was not a great impact. Similarly, Mathew et al. (2024) discovered that irregular sleep patterns and greater variation in sleep timing are linked with poorer academic functioning and school performance. School start times also may influence a student academic experience on a day to day basis. James et al. (2023) found that delaying high school start times was associated with fewer late times absences and arrival times with a major improvement in grade point averages. Overall, all of these findings help us understand that both sleep habits and school schedules may influence teenager’s influence to learn and perform better academically.

== See also ==
- Effects of sleep deprivation on cognitive performance
- List of thought processes
- Lucid dream
- Preconscious
- Sharp wave–ripple complexes
- Sleep-learning
- Unconscious mind
