= Frank R. Paul =

American science fiction illustrator (1884–1963)

- Paul, c. 1939
- Born: Rudolph Franz Paul; April 18, 1884; Radkersburg, Austria-Hungary
- Died: June 29, 1963 (aged 79); Teaneck, New Jersey, U.S.
- Known for: Illustration
- Spouse: Rudolpha Costa Rigelsen

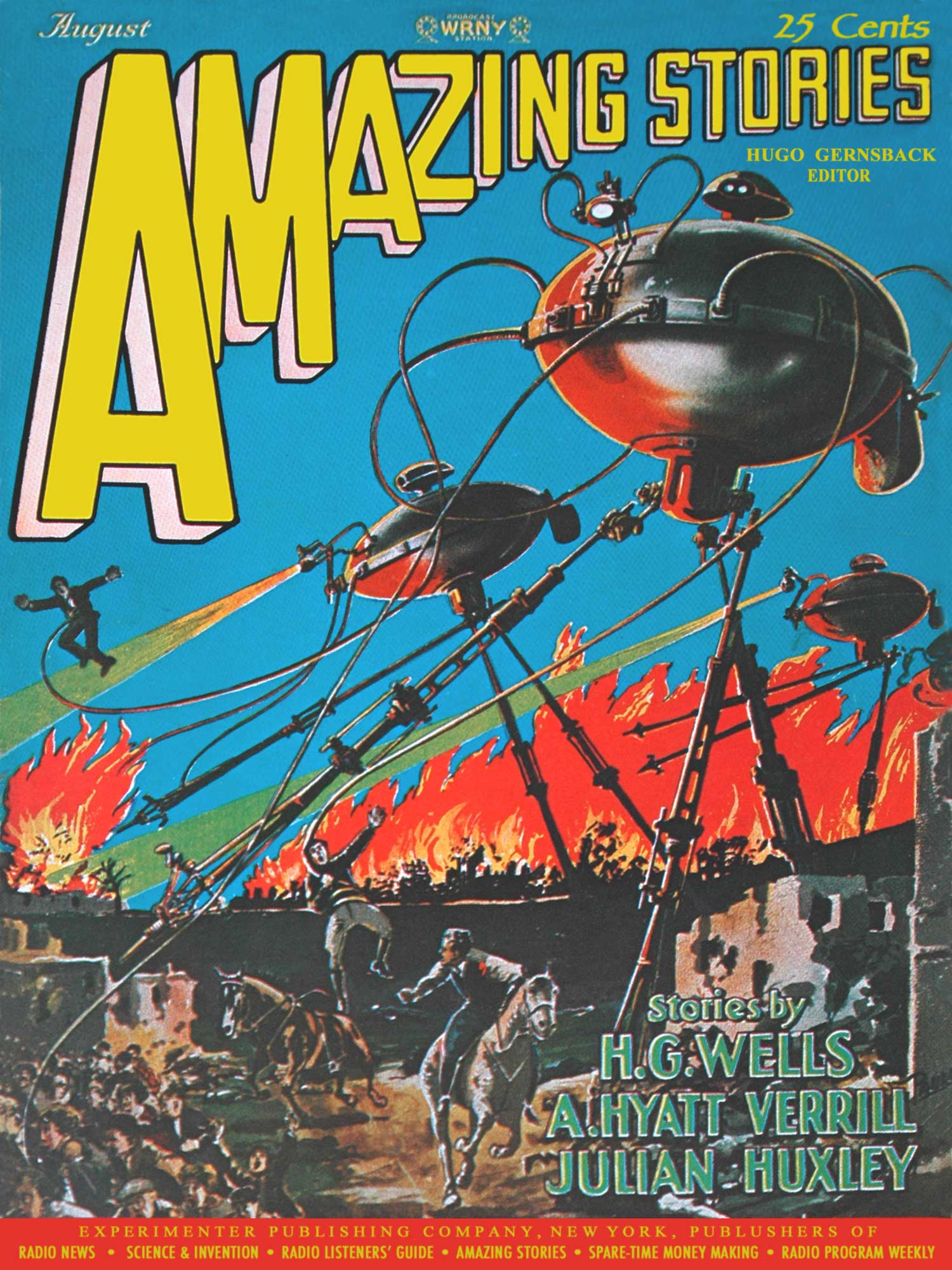
Paul's cover for Amazing Stories, August 1927, illustrating The War of the Worlds

Rudolph Franz Paul (German: [paʊl]; born Rudolph Franz Wilhelm Paul; April 18, 1884 – June 29, 1963) was an American illustrator of pulp magazines in the science fiction field.

A discovery of editor Hugo Gernsback, Paul was influential in defining the look of both cover art and interior illustrations in the nascent science fiction pulps of the 1920s.

The Science Fiction Hall of Fame inducted him in 2009.

== Biography ==
Rudolph Paul was born on April 18, 1884, in Radkersburg, Austria-Hungary. His father was from Hungary and his mother from Czechoslovakia. He emigrated to the United States in 1906. He married Rudolpha Costa Rigelsen, a Belgian immigrant, in 1913, and they had four children, Robert S. Paul (born 1915), Franz L. Paul (born 1919), Joan C. Paul (born 1921), and Patricia Ann Paul (born 1929). He studied art in Vienna, Paris, and New York City. He went to work for the Jersey Journal performing graphic design. Publisher Hugo Gernsback hired him in 1914 to illustrate The Electrical Experimenter, a science magazine.

He died on June 29, 1963, aged 79, at his home in Teaneck, New Jersey.

== Work ==
Paul's work is characterized by dramatic compositions (often involving enormous machines, robots or spaceships), bright or even garish colors, and a limited ability to depict human faces, especially the female ones. His early architectural training is also evident in his work.

Paul illustrated the cover of Gernsback's own novel, Ralph 124C 41+: A Romance of the Year 2660 (The Stratford Company, 1925), originally a 1911–1912 serial. He painted 38 covers for Amazing Stories from April 1926 to June 1929 and seven for the Amazing Stories Annual and Quarterly; with several dozen additional issues featuring his art on the back cover (May 1939 to July 1946), and several issues from April 1961 to September 1968 featuring new or reproduced art. After Gernsback lost control of Amazing Stories in 1929, Paul followed him to the Wonder Stories magazines and associated quarterlies, which published 103 of his color covers from June 1929 to April 1936. Paul also painted covers for Planet Stories, Superworld Comics, Science Fiction magazine, and the first issue (October–November 1939) of Marvel Comics. The latter featured the debuts of Human Torch and Sub-Mariner, and good copies sell at auction for twenty to thirty thousand dollars. All told, his magazine covers exceed 220.

His most famous Amazing Stories cover is probably that for August 1927 (see image), illustrating The War of the Worlds by H. G. Wells, whose serial reprint began in that number.

Paul created hundreds of interior illustrations from no later than 1920.

From The Pen of Paul: The Fantastic Images of Frank R. Paul, edited and an introduction by Stephen Korshak with a preface by Sir Arthur C. Clarke, is a giant compendium and very first collection ever published showcasing many of Paul's full-color science-fiction artwork; Korshak Collection.

== Influence on the genre ==
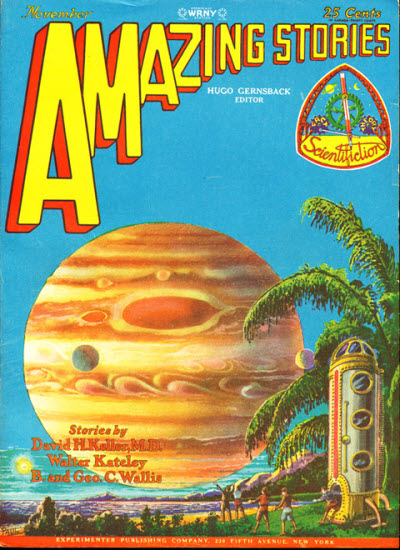
Surprisingly accurate depiction of Jupiter by Frank R. Paul on the November 1928 cover of Amazing Stories

In many ways, Frank R. Paul's achievements and influence on the field through the decades cannot be overestimated. His work appeared on the cover of the first issue (April 1926) of Amazing Stories magazine, the first magazine dedicated to science fiction. He would paint all the covers for over three years. These visions of robots, spaceships, and aliens were presented to an America wherein most people did not even have a telephone. Indeed, they were the first science fiction images seen by Ray Bradbury, Arthur C. Clarke, Forrest J Ackerman, and others who would go on to great prominence in the field. Arthur C. Clarke wrote that the first science fiction magazine he encountered was the November 1928 edition of Amazing Stories, with a cover by Paul. He cites this as a crucial early incident that shifted his interest to science fiction. Clarke also comments on Paul's accurate depiction of Jupiter on that 1928 cover:

"But the giant planet is painted with such stunning accuracy that one could use this cover to make a very good case for precognition; Paul has shown turbulent cloud formations, cyclonic patterns and enigmatic white structures like earth-sized amoebae which were not revealed until the Voyager missions over fifty years later. How did he know?"

Paul's emphasis on concept, action and milieu over human figures was to continue to be a defining genre signal of SF art even when executed by successors with greater technical skill and more depth of artistic vision. The visual language of the majority of SF art centers, even today, are more sophisticated versions of Paul's central tropes.

The Frank R. Paul Award, named in his honor, was awarded by the Nashville Science Fiction Association from 1976 to 1996 to such distinguished artists as Frank Kelly Freas, Alex Schomburg and Victoria Poyser.

== Firsts ==
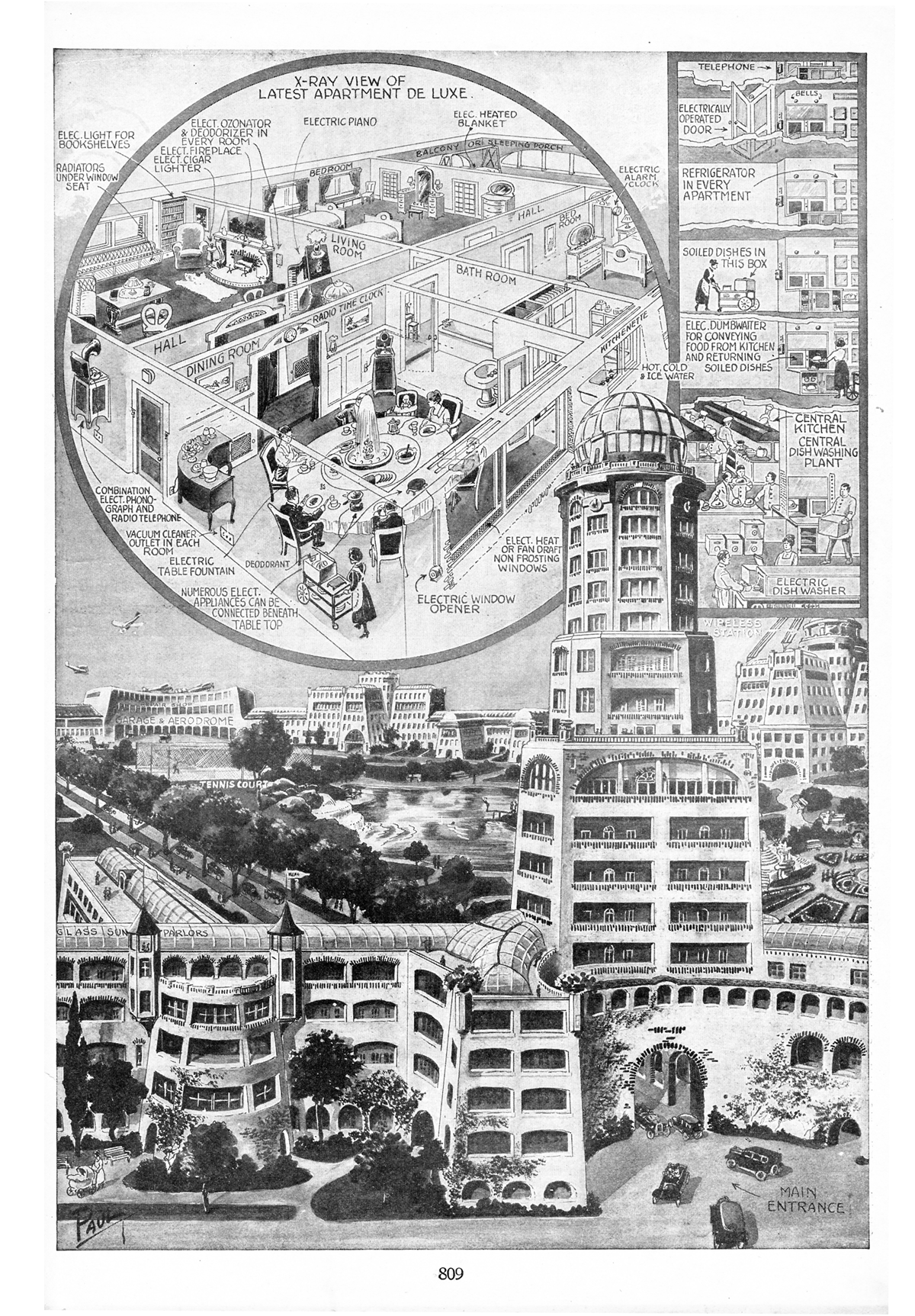
Early story illustration in Gernsback's Science and Invention (January 1922)

Frank R. Paul can be credited with the first color painting of a space station (August 1929, Science Wonder Stories) published in the U.S. His cover for the November 1929 Science Wonder Stories was an early, if not the earliest, depiction of a flying saucer. This painting appeared almost two decades before the sightings of mysterious flying objects by Kenneth Arnold. So large was his stature that he was the only guest of honor at the first World Science Fiction Convention in 1939. He has been described as the first person to make a living drawing spaceships; this is a slight exaggeration, as much of his income was also derived from technical drawing. He was also the cover artist of Marvel Comics #1 (Oct. 1939), the first ever Marvel Comic and became well known for his work.

He was very innovative in the depiction of spaceships. Several of his illustrations were disc shaped and it has been speculated that he may have, accidentally, created the UFO craze when the first sighting of lights in the sky were described as disc shaped; this would have been the result of the psychological phenomenon known as mental set.

== Gallery ==
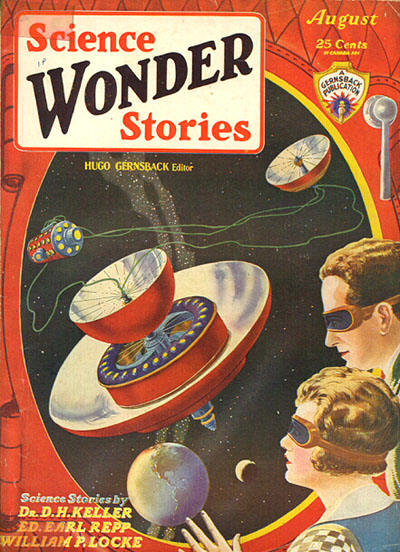
Space station, August 1929

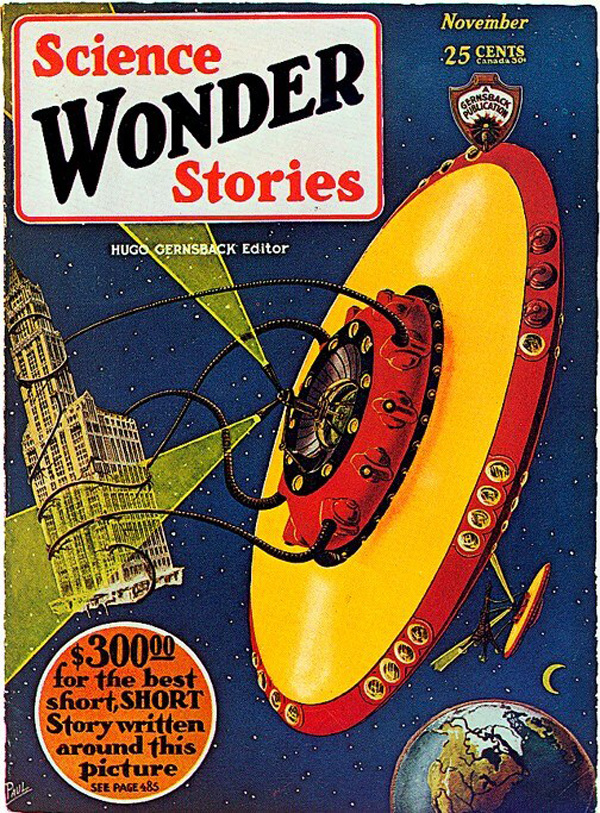
Early depiction of a flying saucer, November 1929

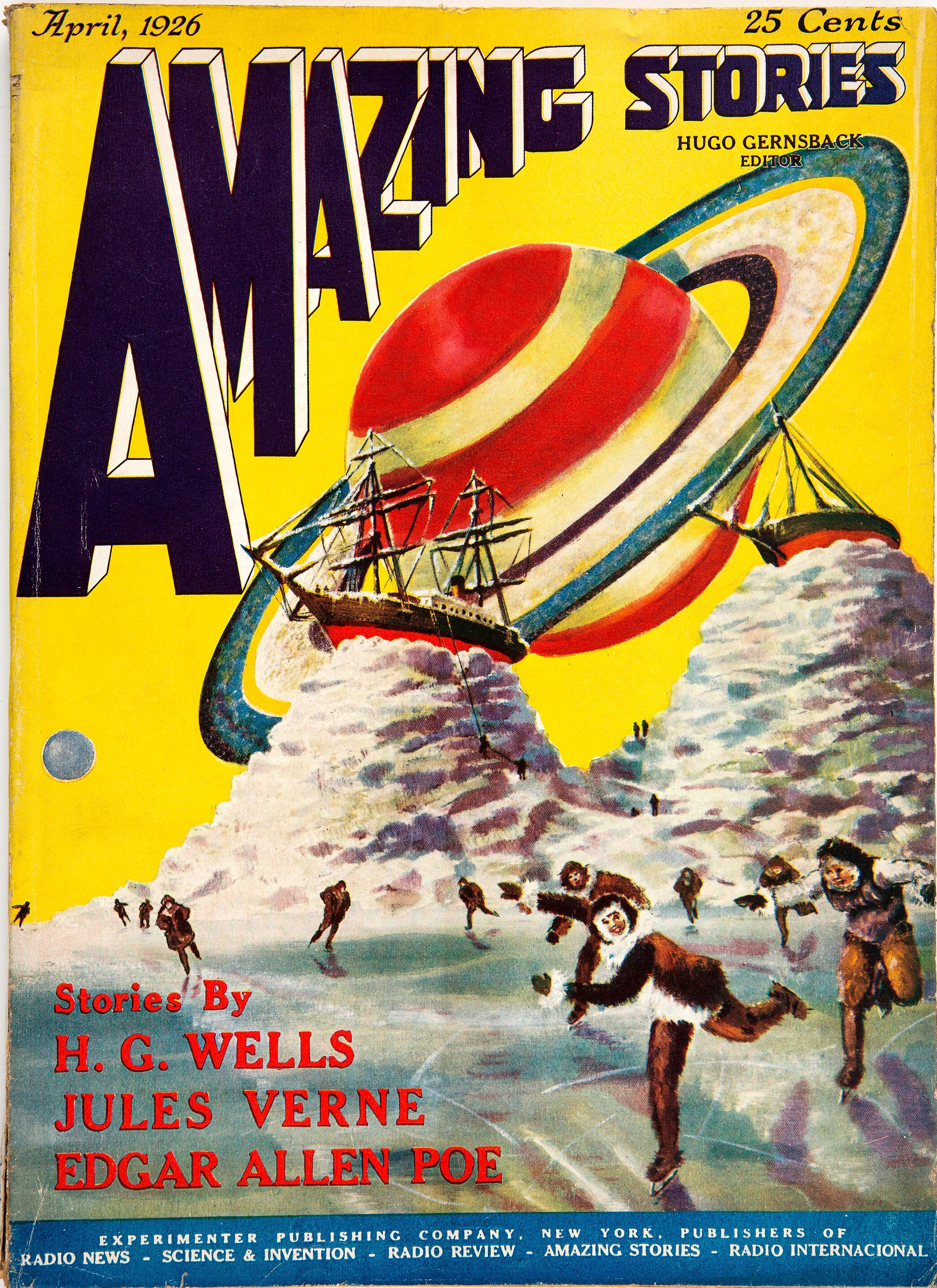
First issue of Amazing Stories, April 1926

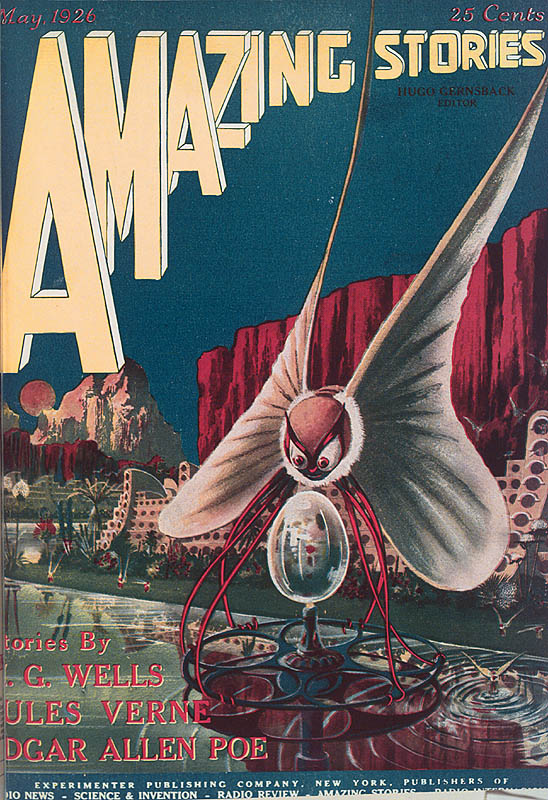
Martian being for "The Crystal Egg" by H. G. Wells, May 1926

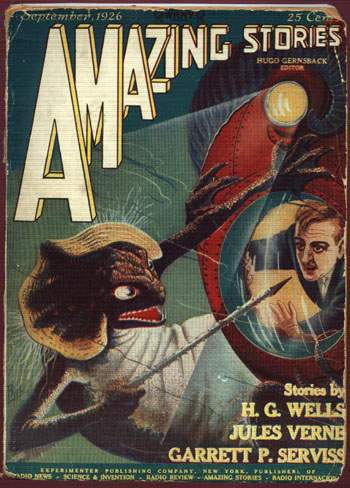
Creature from In the Abyss by H. G. Wells, September 1926

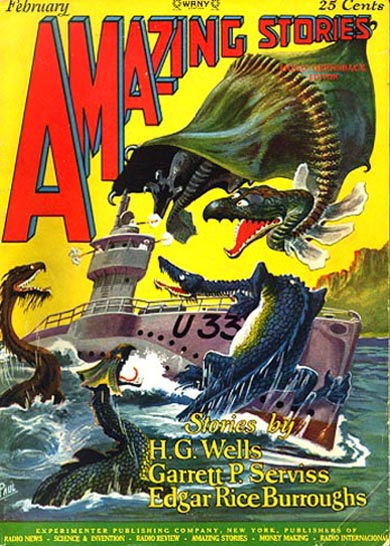
Prehistoric monsters from The Land That Time Forgot by Edgar Rice Burroughs, February 1927

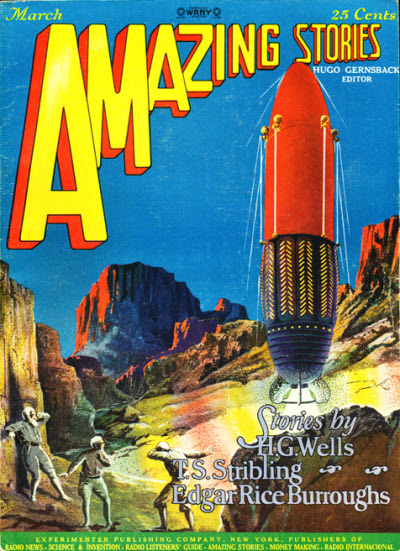
Space scene, 1927

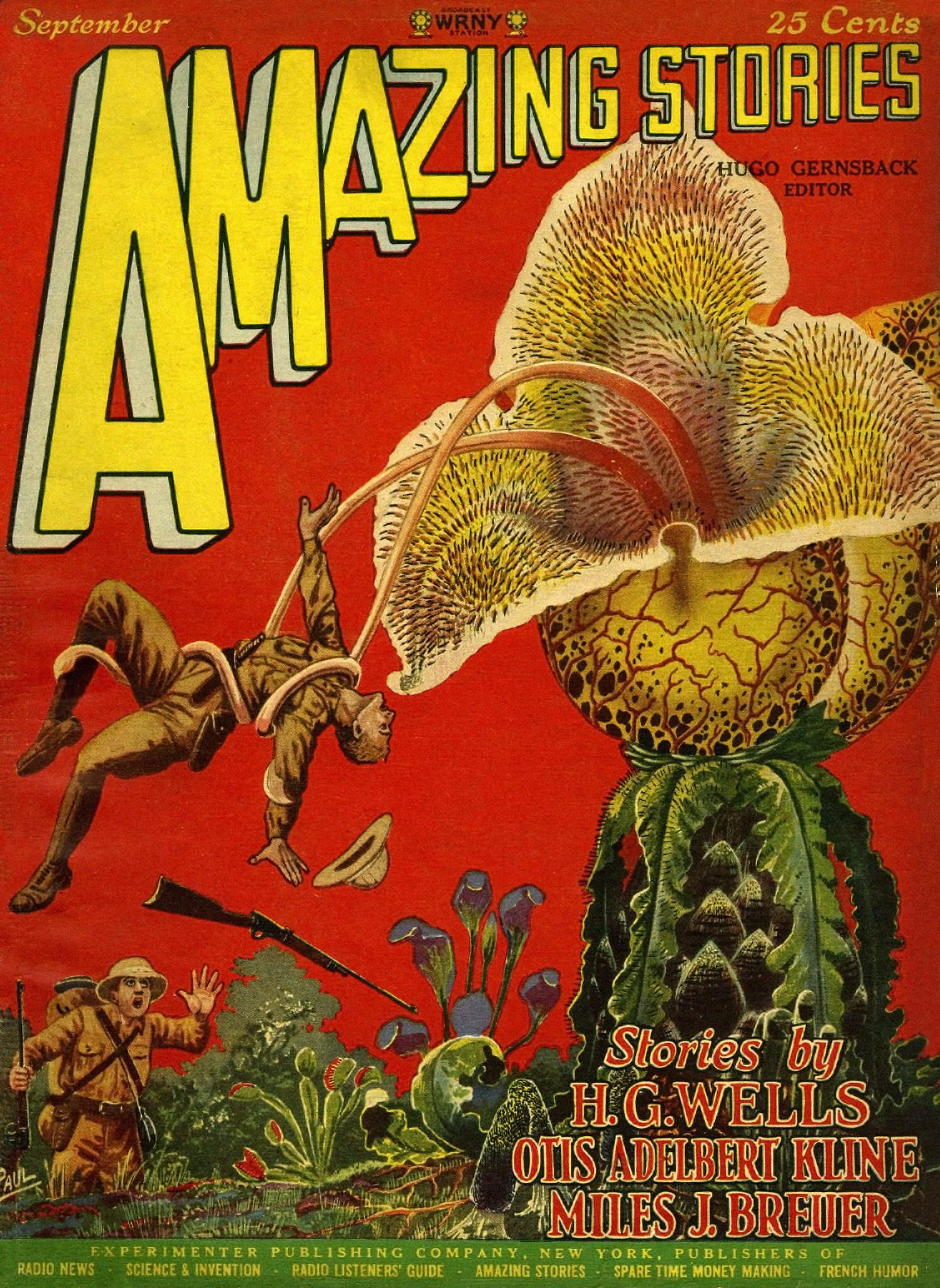
Man-eating plant, September 1927

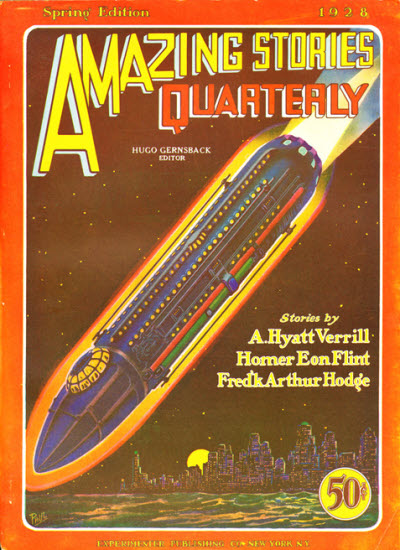
Spaceship scene, 1928

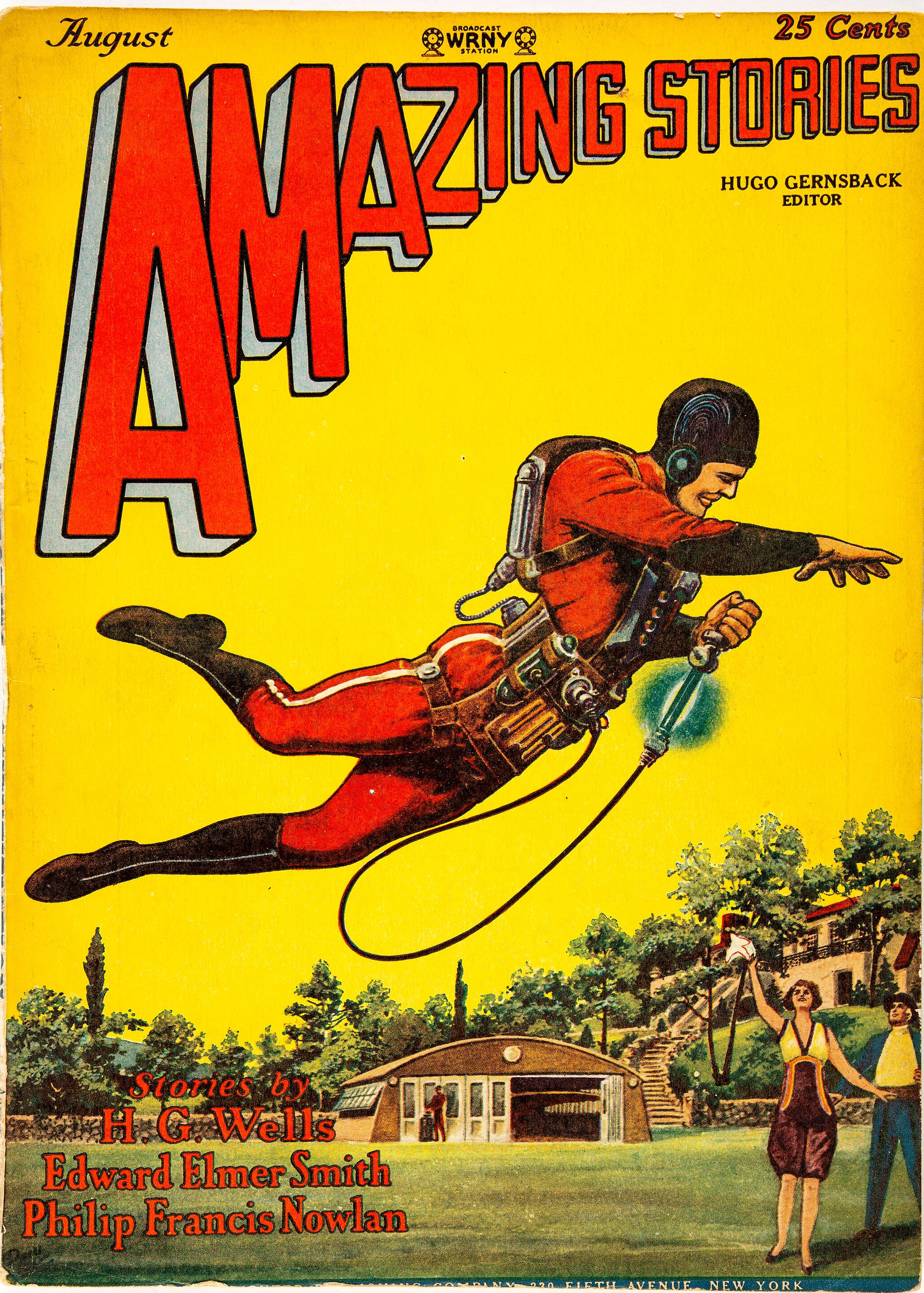
Flying suit, August 1928

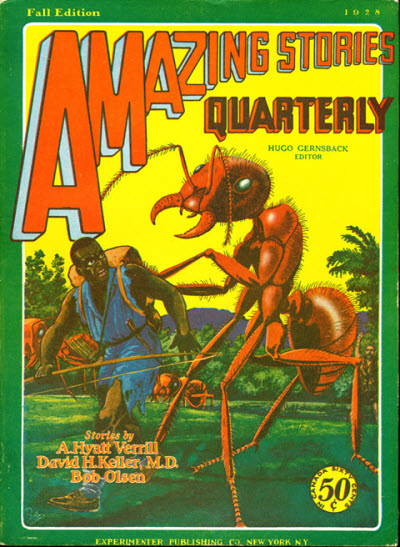
Giant ants, 1928

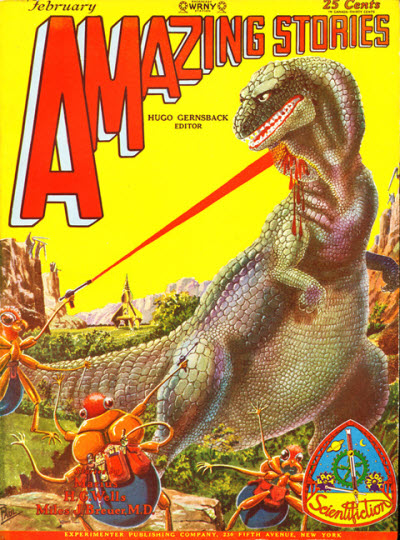
Dinosaur hunted by aliens, February 1929

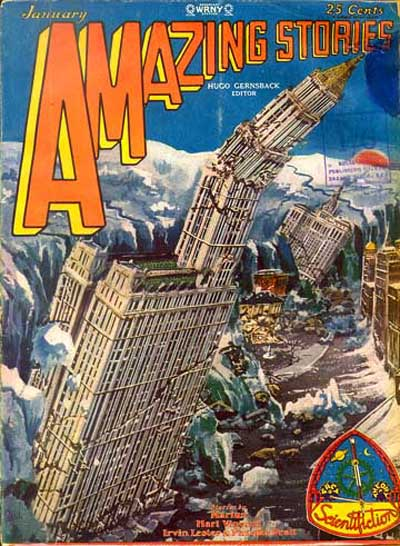
City destroyed by an ice sheet, January 1929

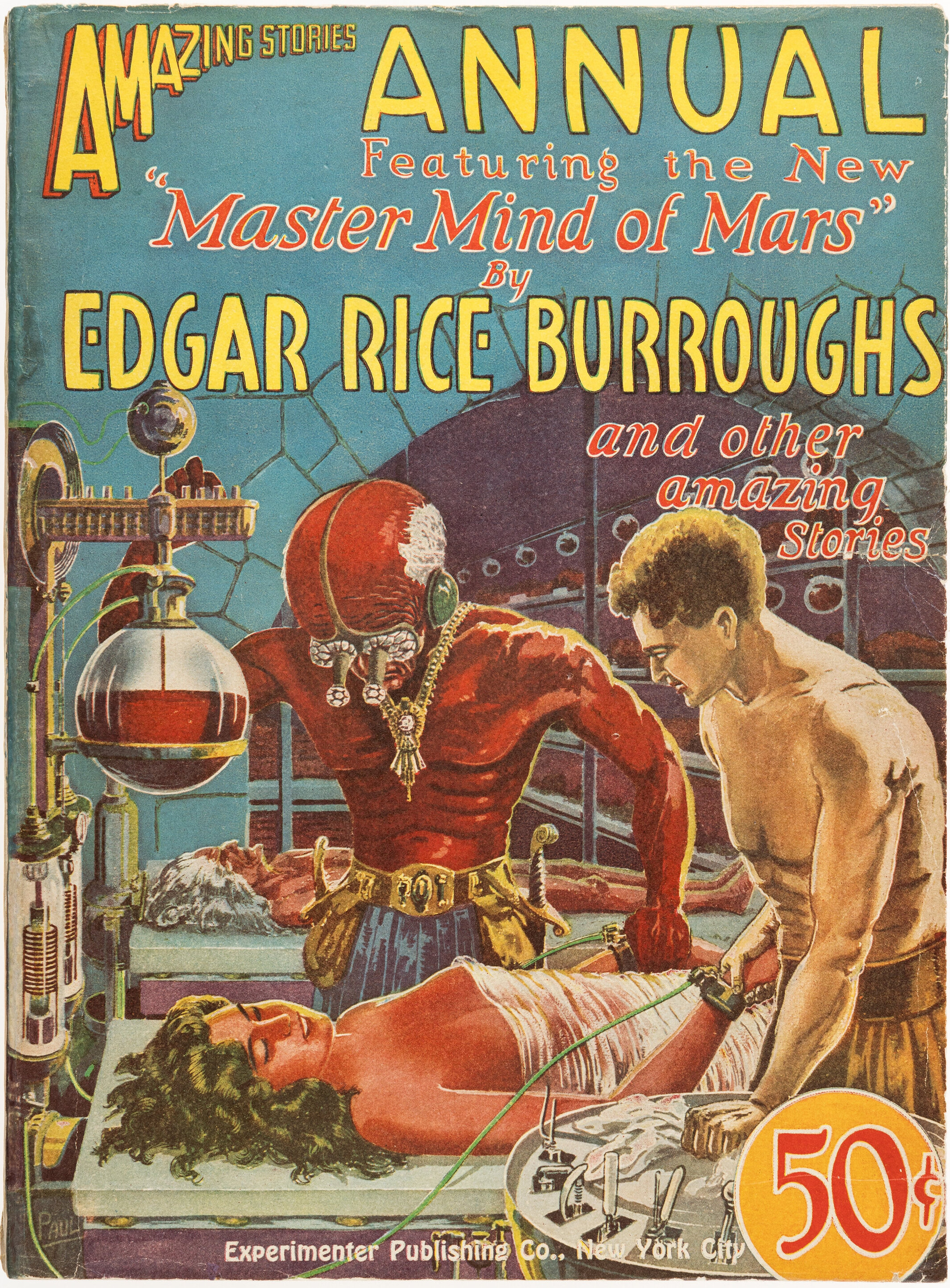
John Carter from Master Mind of Mars by Edgar Rice Burroughs, 1927

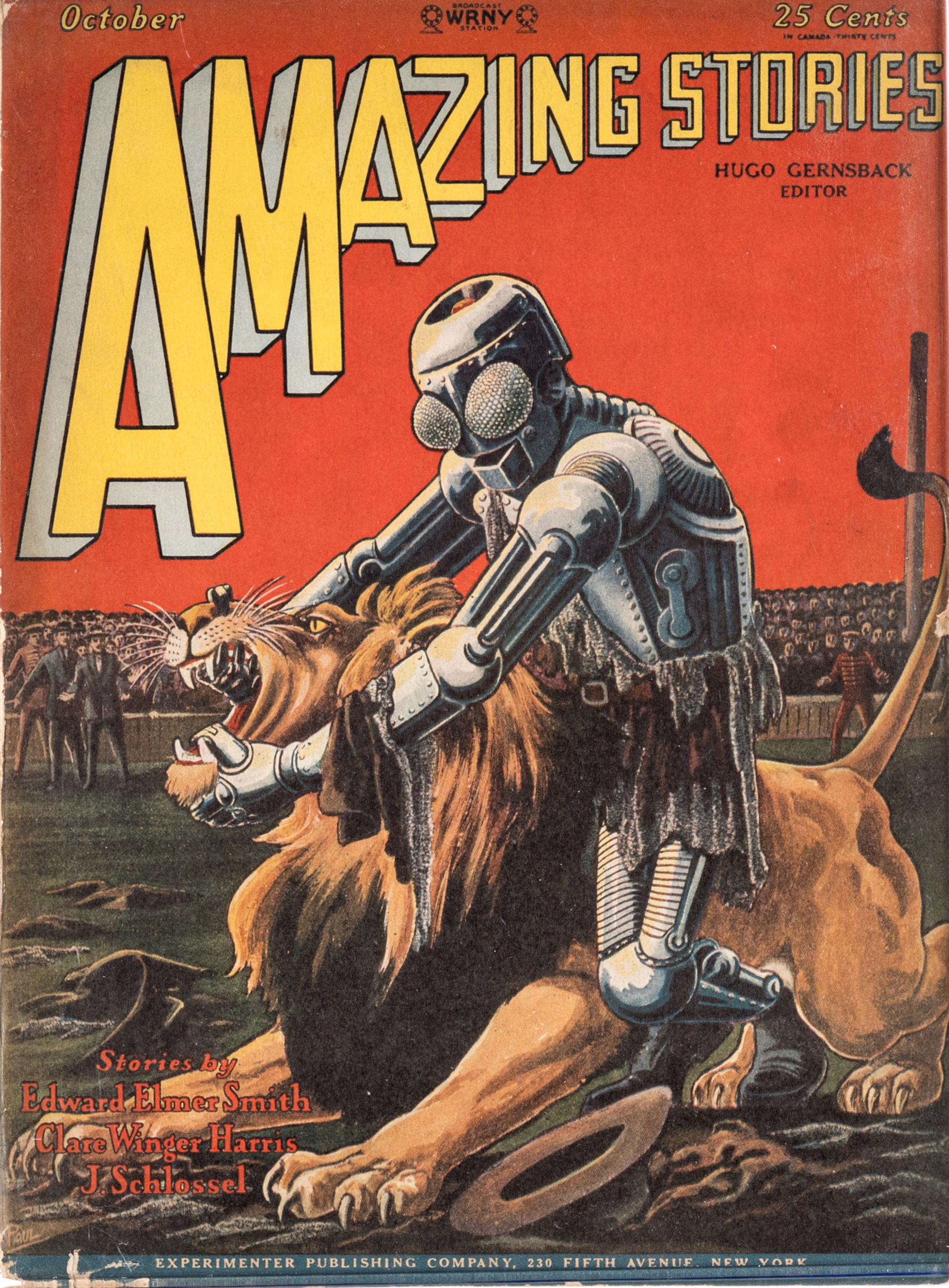
Robot battling a lion, October 1928

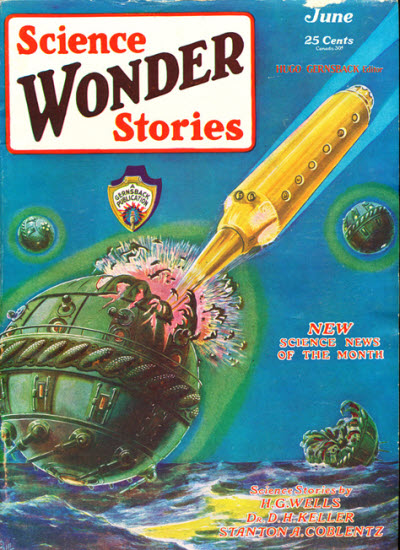
First issue of Science Wonder Stories, June 1929

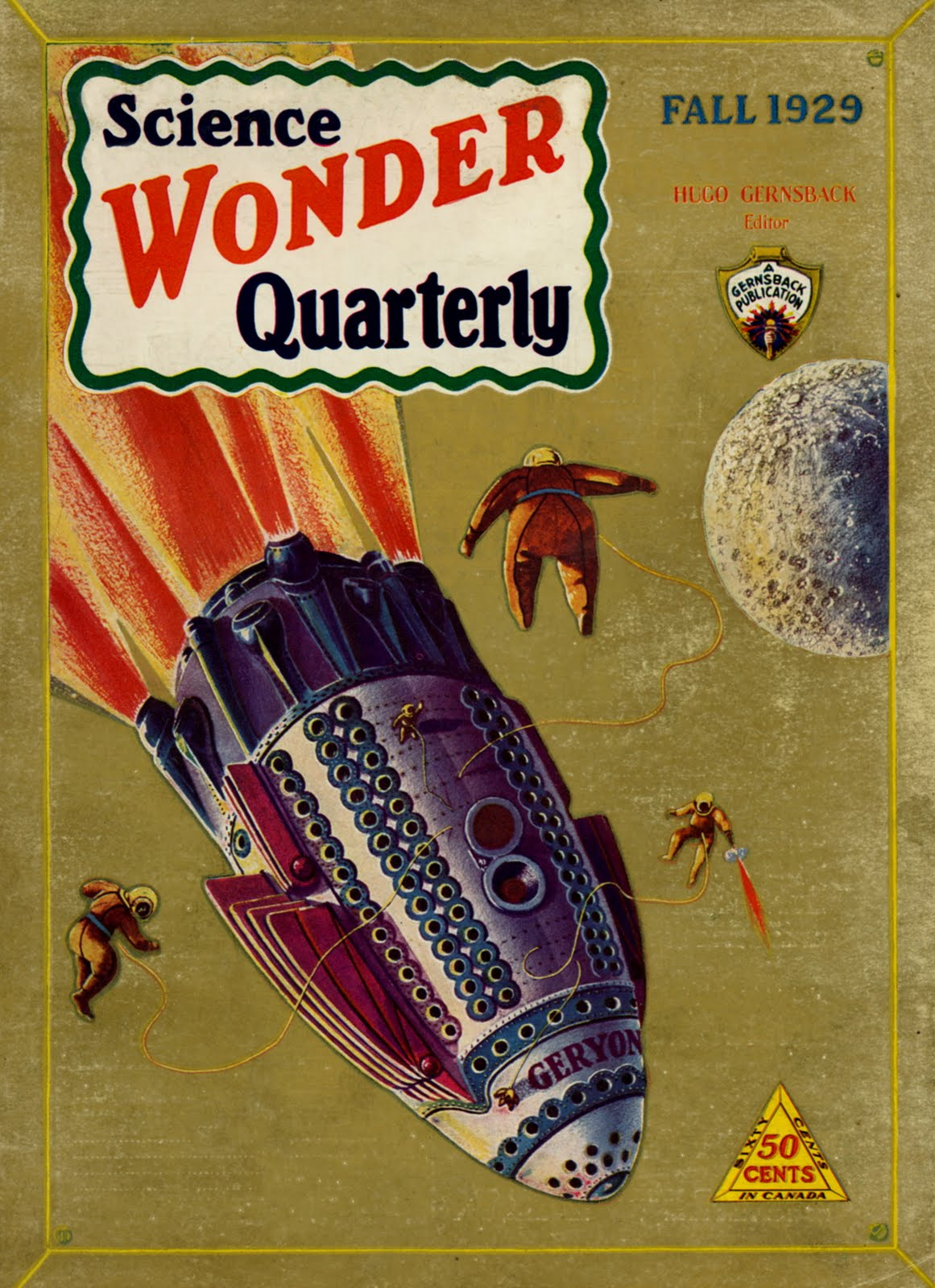
Spaceship scene, 1929

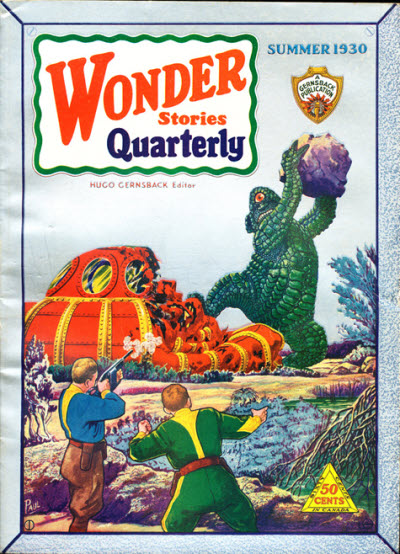
Giant alien monster, 1930

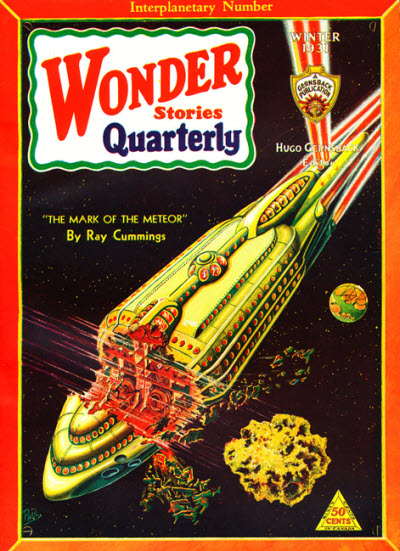
Spaceship hit by a meteor, 1931

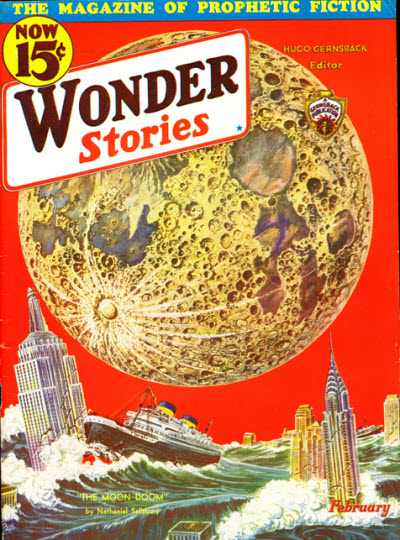
Moon approaches Earth, February 1933

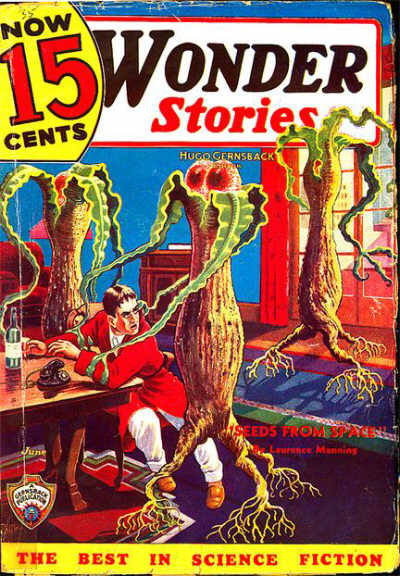
"Seeds from Space" plant beings, June 1935

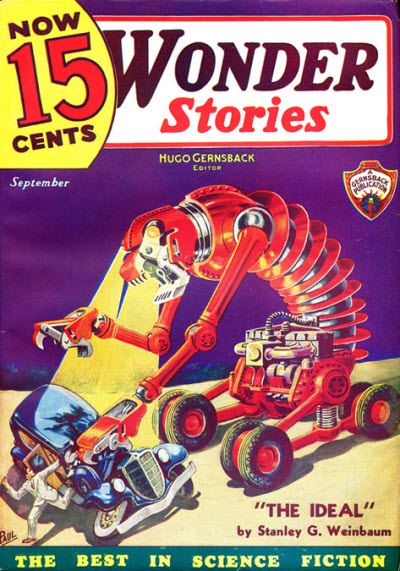
Mechanical monster, September 1935

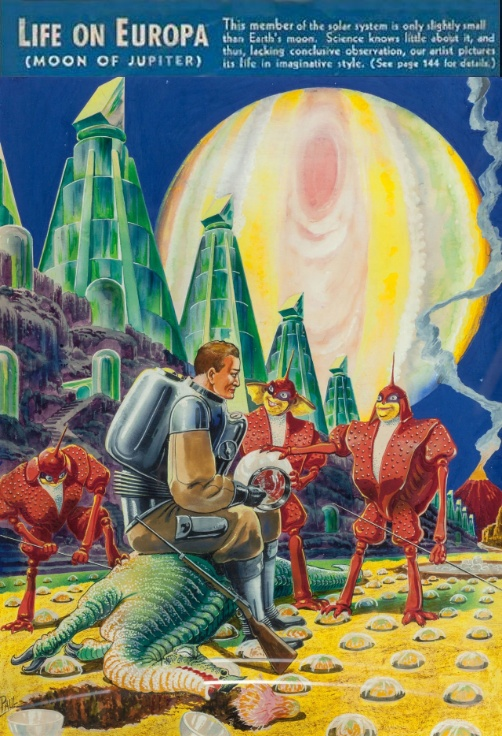
Life on Europa, back cover of Amazing Stories, September 1940

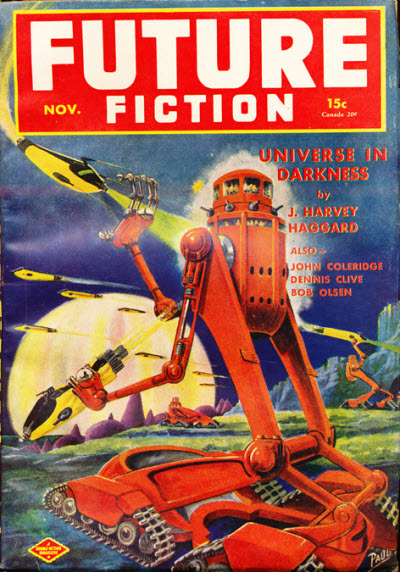
Giant fighting machines, November 1940

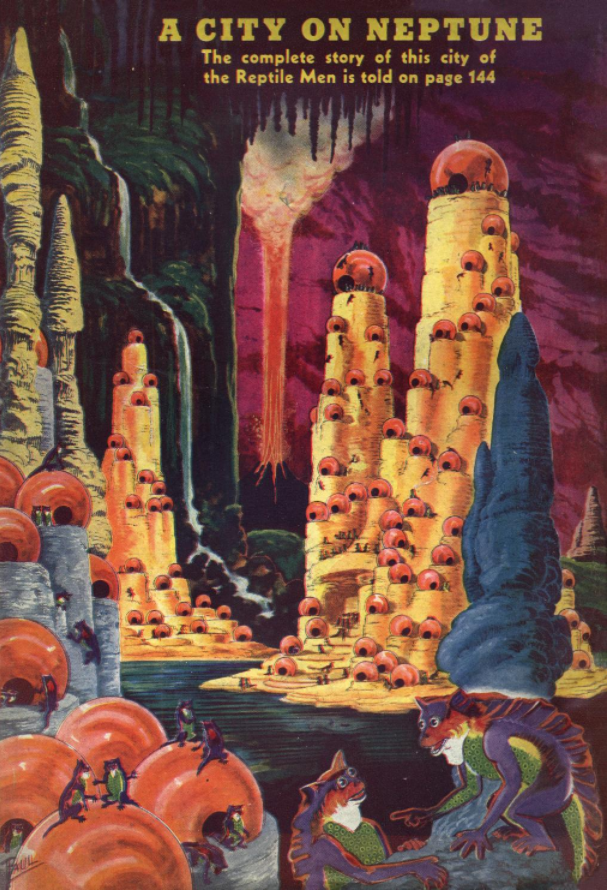
City on Neptune, back cover of Amazing Stories, March 1941

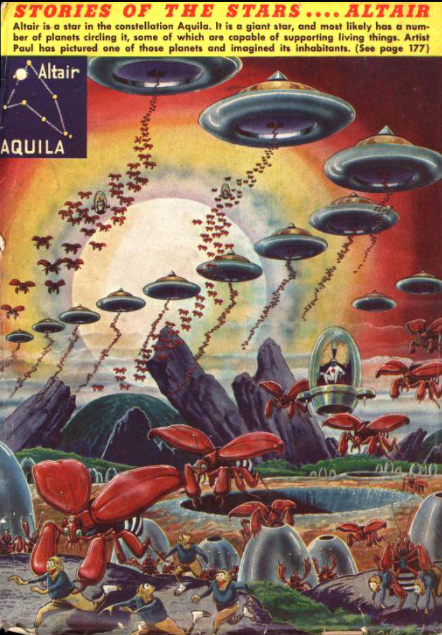
Flying saucers on back cover of Amazing Stories in 1946

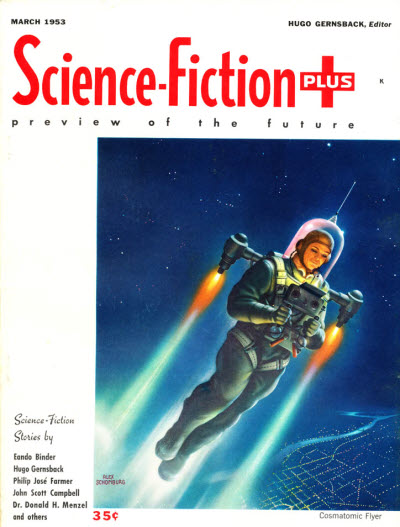
Rocket suit, March 1953

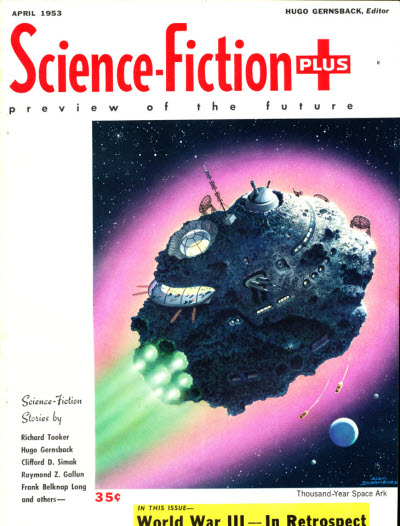
Thousand-year space ark, May 1953

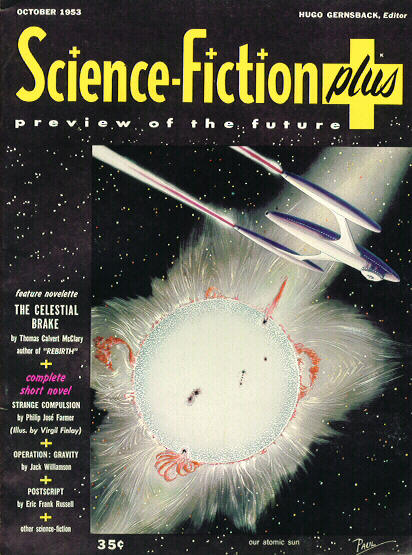
Interstellar spaceship, October 1953

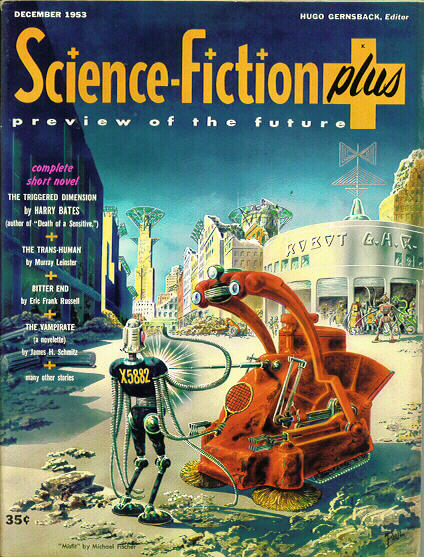
Robot city, December 1953
