= Experimenter =

Experimenter can mean:

- An experimentalist, a researcher whose primary focus is on experiments
- Experimenter (film), a 2015 film about Stanley Milgram's infamous experiments on the response to authority
- Experimenter Publishing, an American media company founded by Hugo Gernsback
