= Radio News =

American technology magazine (1919–1971)

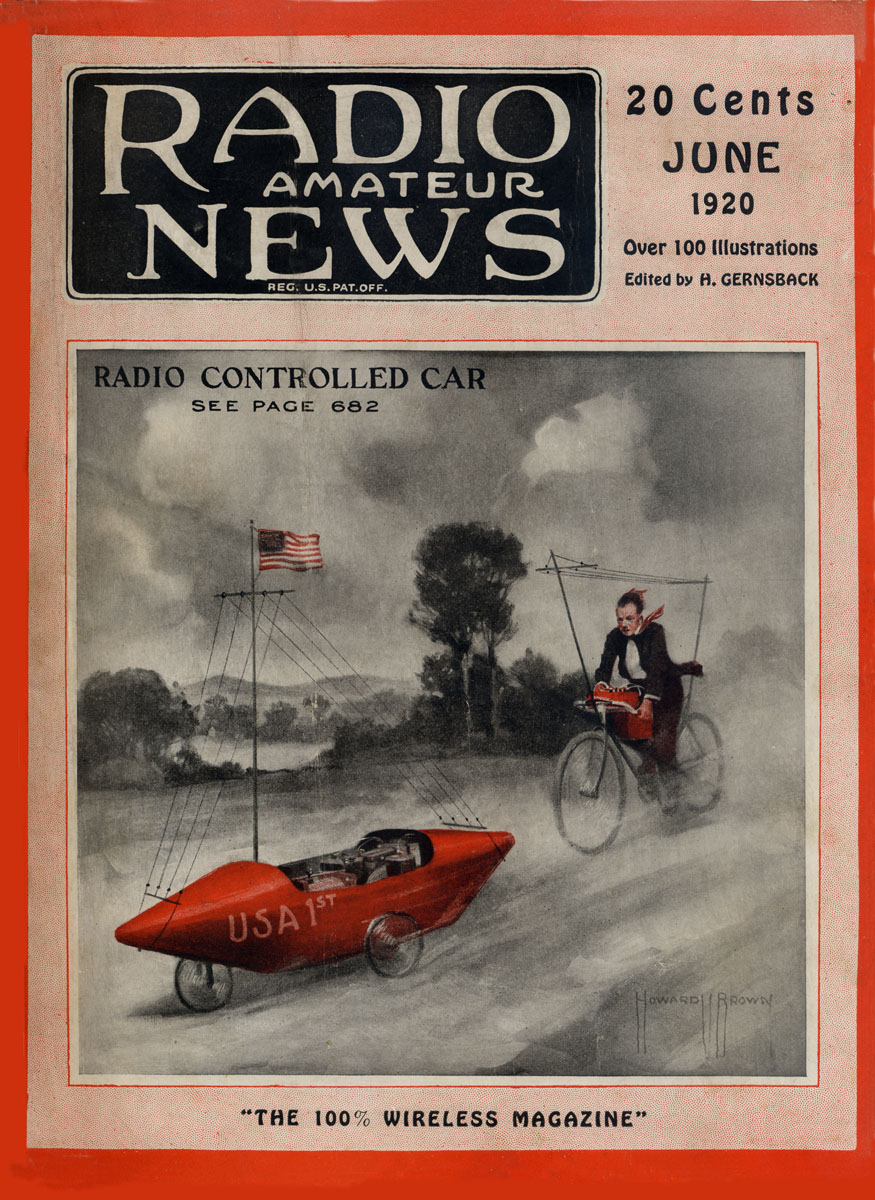
First year issue of Radio News; Hugo Gernsback, Editor.

Radio News was an American monthly technology magazine published from 1919 to 1971. The magazine was started by Hugo Gernsback as a magazine for amateur radio enthusiasts, but it evolved to cover all the technical aspects to radio and electronics. In 1929, a bankruptcy forced the sale of Gernsback's publishing company to B. A. Mackinnon. In 1938, Ziff-Davis Publishing acquired the magazines.

== Gernsback Era ==
In 1904 Hugo Gernsback established Electro Importing Company to sell radio components and electrical supplies by mail order. The catalogs had detailed instructions on projects like a wireless telegraph outfit and were the predecessor of his first magazine, Modern Electrics (April 1908). In May 1913 he started another magazine, The Electrical Experimenter. The magazines would have Gernsback's bold predictions of the future as well as fiction. In 1926, he started the magazine Amazing Stories and coined the term "scientifiction" which became science fiction.

Gernsback was an enthusiastic supporter of amateur radio. During the First World War the US government placed a ban on amateur radio and Gernsback led the campaign to lift it. Gernsback started a magazine devoted to radio, Radio Amateur News (July 1919). The title was shortened to Radio News in July 1920.

== Bankruptcy ==
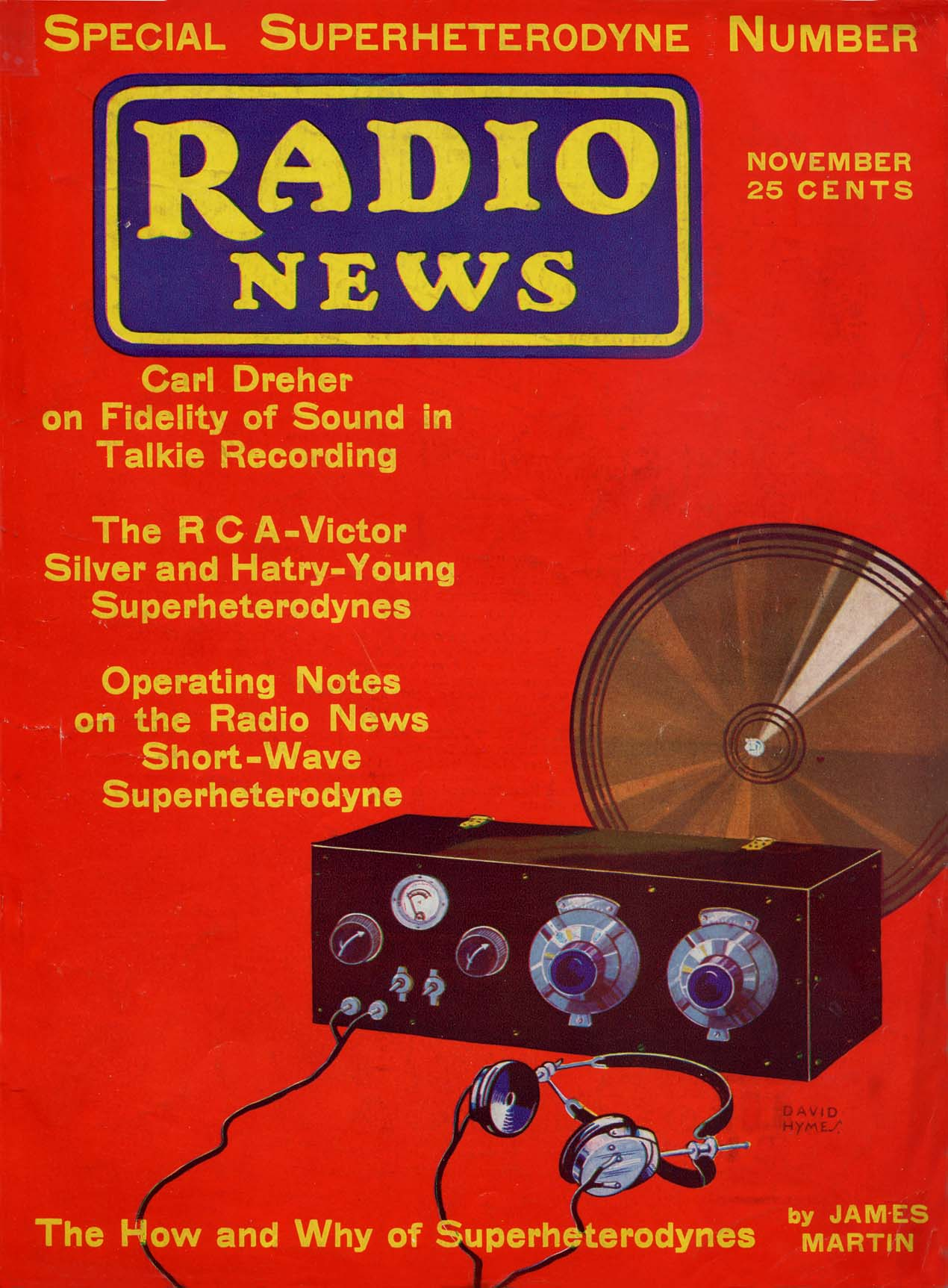
November 1930 issue of Radio News

These magazines were published by The Experimenter Publishing Company Inc. and would prominently show "Edited by HUGO GERNSBACK" (or "Edited by H. GERNSBACK") on the cover. Hugo and his brother Sydney had a booming empire. In addition to Experimenter Publishing, they had two radio stations and published books. They would use the money from newsstand sales to pay the printers for last month's magazine. On February 20, 1929 an involuntary petition of bankruptcy was filed against Experimenter Publishing and the April 1929 issue of Radio News was the last to feature Hugo Gernsback as editor. Gernsback quickly raised the capital for a new publishing company. He created new set of magazines to compete with his previous ones. Radio-Craft was competing with Radio News by the July 1929 issue.

Radio News new publisher was B. A. MacKinnon and the new company was Experimenter Publications which became Radio-Science Publications in June 1930. Arthur H. Lynch dropped the forecasting of things to come and provided the technical information to design, service, and operate radio equipment. The cover art changed from people in dramatic or humorous scenes to a solid red cover showing a single component or piece of equipment.

Radio-Science Publications ceased operations with the August 1931 issues. Bernarr Macfadden's newly formed Teck Publishing Corporation took over with the September 1931 issue. Laurence Cockaday became the editor; the format remained the same but the advances in radio and television broadened the topics covered. A common item in all radio magazines was a list of broadcast stations and short wave stations. In 1934 the covers had black-and-white photos. Color illustrations returned in 1936.

A sister magazine, Television News was published in 1931–32.

== Ziff-Davis Publishing ==
The Radio News and Amazing Stories were acquired by Ziff-Davis Publishing in January 1938. The March issue was prepared by the Teck Publishing staff but Ziff-Davis was listed as the publisher. The magazine was down to 64 pages. The April 1938 issue was the first produced by Ziff-Davis. The cover has a full color picture of Lucille Ball and an additional 20 pages of gossip and radio star coverage. The articles were to broaden the readership to more than engineers and repair men. (Almost all of the readers were male.) The radio star covers lasted only a few months. William B. Ziff, Sr., the majority owner, was the publisher and Bernard G. Davis was the Editor. In the mid-1940s Davis became the General Manager and Oliver Read was the editor.

The great advances in electronics during World War II were finally available to consumers and industry in the late 1940s. These included television, FM radio, tape recording, Hi-Fi audio. Industry saw advanced test equipment, early computers, and improved communication systems. The two leading technical radio magazines changed their names to reflect this. In 1948 Radio-Craft became Radio-Electronics and Radio News became Radio & Television News (August 1948). It was shortened to Radio & TV News in May 1957. Both magazines had covered similar topics but Radio-Electronics emphasized repair and service while Radio & Television News emphasized design and engineering.

William Ziff Sr. died of a heart attack in December 1953. His 23-year-old son, William B. Ziff, Jr., was a philosophy student at the University of Heidelberg but he immersed himself into the magazine business. In 1957, William Ziff, Jr. bought out Davis' minority share. Bernard G. Davis and his son, Joel, formed Davis Publications in August 1957. They acquired Mercury Publications, Inc which published Ellery Queen's Mystery Magazine and Science & Mechanics Publishing which published Radio-TV Experimenter magazine. Science & Mechanics magazine was started by Hugo Gernsback in 1929 and stayed in print until 1972.

== Electronics World ==
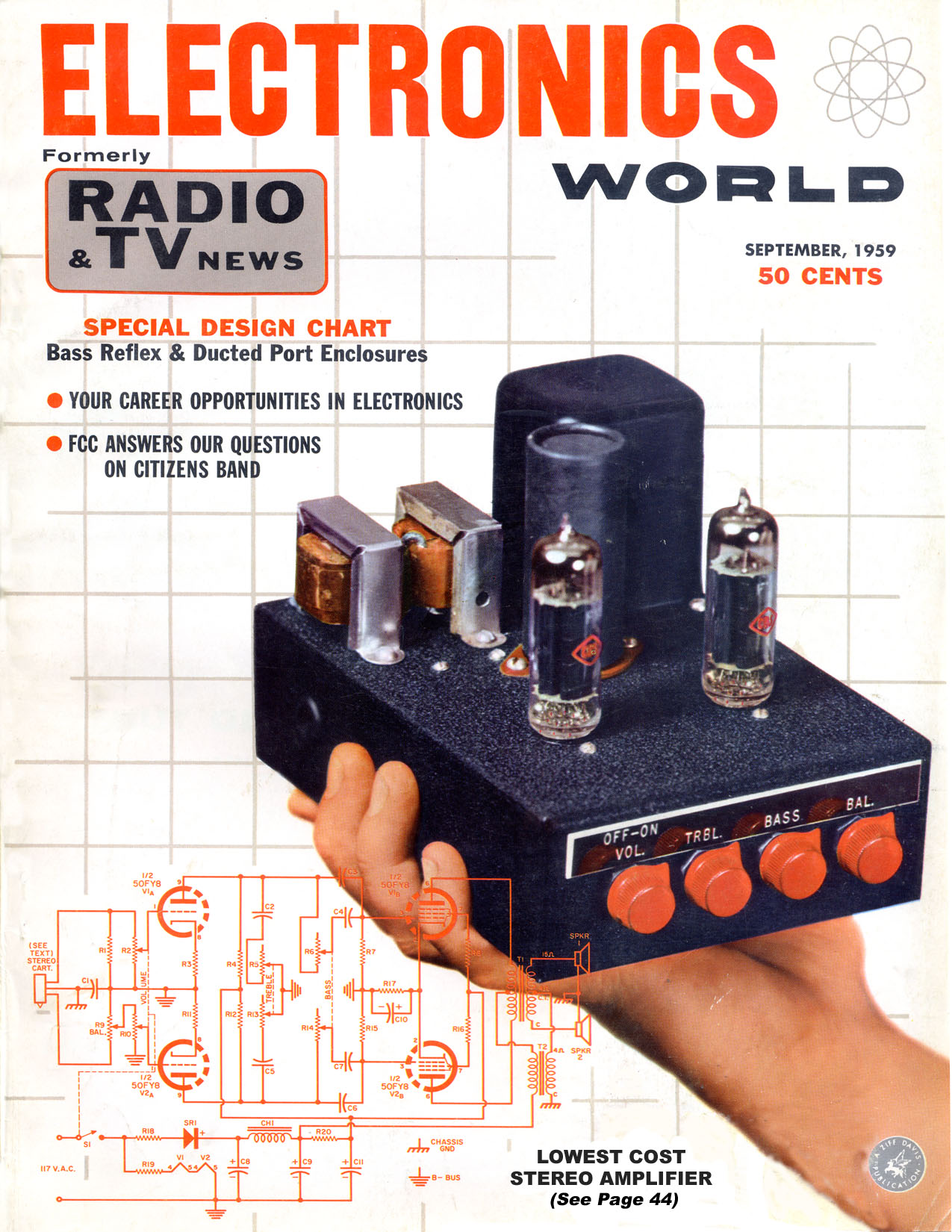
Radio News became Electronics World in 1959.

Ziff-Davis Publishing would develop two categories of magazines; the professional magazine such as Radio & Television News and the leisure time magazines like Popular Photography. In October 1954, Popular Electronics was created for the hobbyist market. It became the largest selling electronics magazine, 250,000 copies per month by 1957 and 450,000 copies by 1965. Initially Oliver Read was the editor of both Radio & Television News and Popular Electronics. Soon Oliver P. Ferrell took over as editor of Popular Electronics and Wm. A. Stocklin as editor of Radio & Television News.

The title Radio & TV News was changed Electronics World in May 1959 to reflect the expanding field of electronics. The feature stories were often on the newest technology and at a sophisticated level. Some examples: "Melting Silicon for Semiconductors" (May 1959), "Computer Arithmetic Circuits" (June 1961), and "Binary Computer Codes and ASCII" (July 1964.) There were also articles on audio and video consumer electronics, communications systems, automotive and industrial electronics.

In 1960, most of the consumer audio, radio and television devices used vacuum tubes. These sets required frequent repair so there was a Radio/TV repair shop in every neighborhood. Electronics World had a section devoted to repair and John T. Frye wrote a monthly column, "Mac's Service Shop". A large portion of the advertisements were directed at the service industry.

The April 1963 issue has a 6 page article, "Electronics in Banking", that explains in detail how the magnetic numbers on the bottom of checks would be read into computers. It also has the first article written by Don Lancaster, "Solid-State 3-Channel Color Organ".

== Popular Electronics ==
Electronics World merges with Popular Electronics in 1972.

By 1970 the experimenter articles in Popular Electronics were at the same level as the articles in Electronics World. Popular Electronics had over twice the readership so in January 1972 Electronics World was merged with Popular Electronics. The changes in the editorial staff during this time induced many of their authors to start writing for their competitor, Radio-Electronics.

In September 1973 Radio Electronics published Don Lancaster's TV Typewriter, a low cost video display. In July 1974 Radio Electronics published the Mark-8 Personal Minicomputer based on the Intel 8008 processor. The editors of Popular Electronics needed a computer project so they selected Ed Robert's Altair 8800 computer based on the improved Intel 8080 processor. The January 1975 issue of Popular Electronics had the Altair computer on the cover.
