= Hermann Plauson =

Estonian engineer

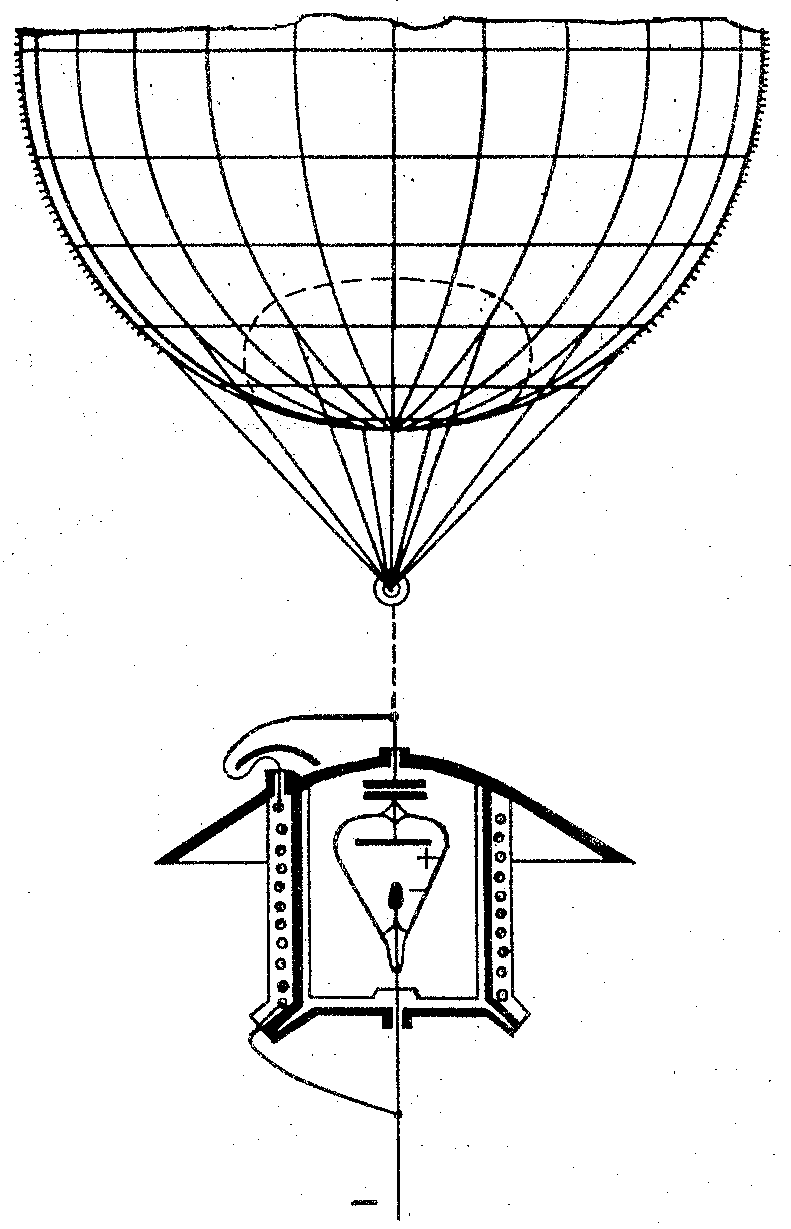
Plauson's node; U.S. Patent 1,540,998

Hermann Plauson (1874 – after 1944) was an Estonian professor, engineer and inventor. Plauson investigated, among other things, the production of power based on atmospheric electricity.

== Biography ==
Plauson was born in Dorpat, Estonia. He was the director of the Fischer–Tropsch "Otto Traun Research Laboratories" in Hamburg during the Weimar Republic of the 1920s. He built on Nikola Tesla's idea for connecting machinery to the "wheelwork of nature". Plauson's patent no. 1540998 describe methods to convert alternating radiant static electricity into rectified continuous current pulses. His systems mainly involved needle & radium- coated electricity conducting balloons or aerostats which were connected to complex converting systems consisting of coils, capacitors, spark gaps etc. He developed an electrostatic generator called Plauson's converter. In 1920, Plauson published a research journal on the subject, titled "Production and Utilization of the Atmospheric Electricity" (Gr., Gewinnung und Verwertung der Atmosphärischen Elektrizität). A second, expanded edition of his journal was published later the same year. A copy of that edition is in the British Library at shelf mark 8754.b.36. A copy is also available in PDF-format, complete with Optical Character Recognition, through the books2ebooks service, here.

He married fellow Gertrud Therese Dora Hildenbrandt in London in 1920. Their son Harald was born in Hamburg in 1923. He was killed on the Eastern Front in the Second World War.

== Patents ==
Personal patents
American

- U.S. patent 1,392,849 – H. Plauson – "Manufacture of dispersiods, colloid powder, and masses therefrom"
- U.S. patent 1,432,895 – H. Plauson – "Reclaiming rubber"
- U.S. patent 1,436,288 – H. Plauson – "Process of the manufacture of Alkyl Ethers of Vinyl alcohols and homologues therefore"
- U.S. patent 1,485,706 – G. Plauson – "Method of carrying out electrochemical reactions and apparatus for the use therein"
- U.S. patent 1,540,998 – H. Plauson – "Conversion of atmospheric electric energy"
- U.S. patent 1,471,059 – H. Plauson – "Process for the manufacture of rubber and ebonite substitutes"

Other

- "Use of Beta-rays and X-rays in Synthesizing Liquid Hydro-carbons From Gaseous Compounds". GB309002, Dec. 30, 1927. Chem. Abs., vol. 24, 1930, p. 299

Company patents (Traun's Forschungs laboratorium)

- "Process and apparatus for converting static atmospheric electrical energy into dynamic electrical energy of any suitable high periodicity" – GB157263
- "Improvements in electric motors" – GB157262
- "Process of synthesis of liquid hydrocarbons" – GB309002

== External articles ==
- "Power from the Air". Science and Invention (Formerly Electrical Experimenter), Feb. 1922, no. 10. Vol IX, Whole No. 106. New York. (nuenergy.org)
- "Power from the Air". Science and invention (Formerly electrical experimenter), March 1922. (nuenergy.org).
