= Experimenter Publishing =

20th-century publisher of science and science fiction

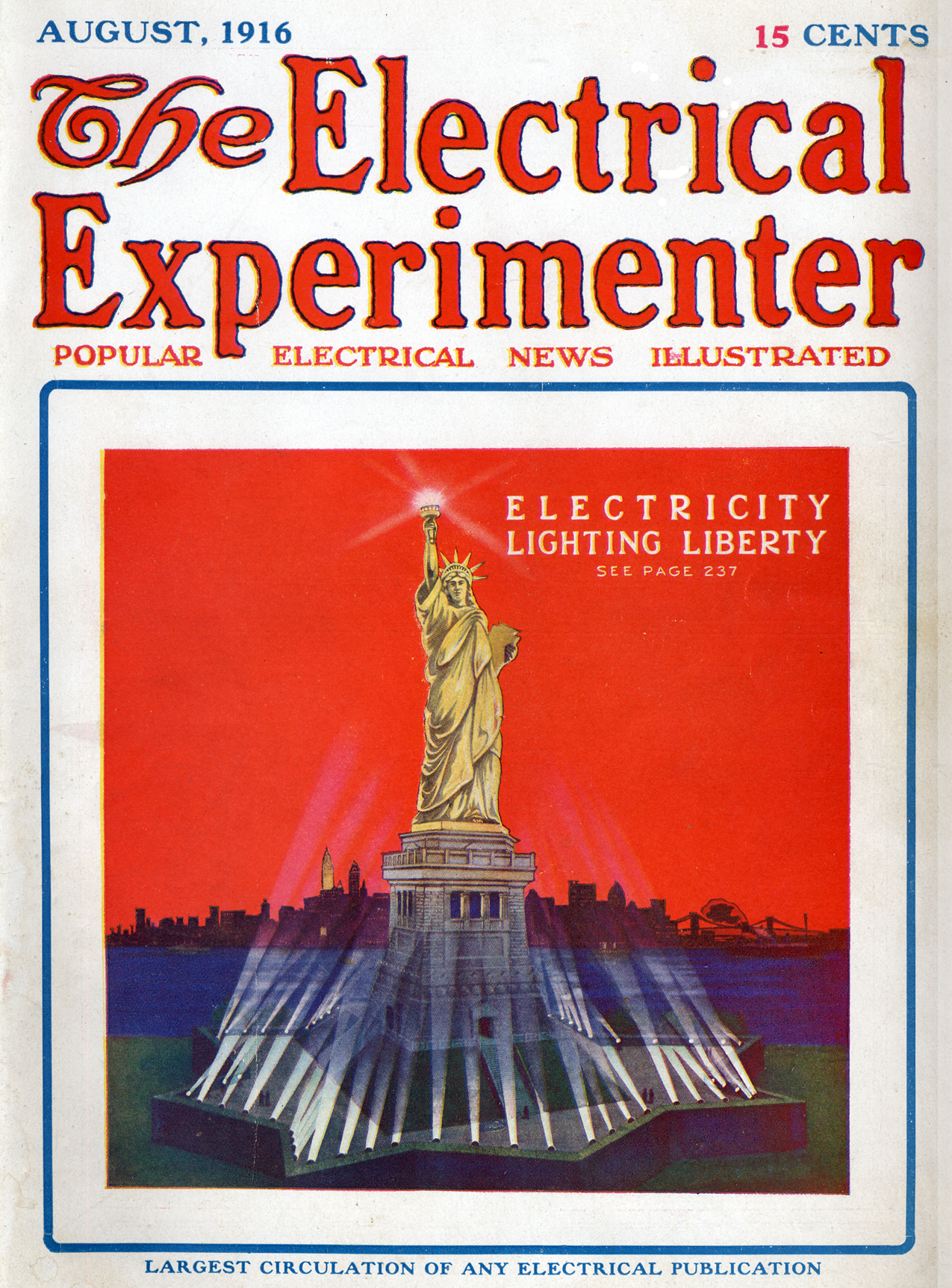
- First issue of The Electrical Experimenter
- Type: Publishing, media
- Industry: Magazines, radio
- Founded: 1915
- Founder: Hugo Gernsback
- Headquarters: United States
- Products: Amazing Stories
- Revenue: 41,348 United States dollar (2021)
- Number of employees: 3 (2021)

Experimenter Publishing was an American media company founded by Hugo Gernsback in 1915. The first magazine was The Electrical Experimenter (1913–1931) and the most notable magazines were Radio News (1919–1985) and Amazing Stories (1926–2005). Their radio station, WRNY, began broadcasting experimental television in 1928. In early 1929 the company was forced into bankruptcy and the Gernsback brothers lost control of Experimenter Publishing. The magazines did not miss an issue and were quickly sold to another publisher. The Gernsbacks promptly started new magazines to compete with their former ones.

Radio News became Popular Electronics and the January 1975 issue featured the Altair 8800 computer on the cover; this launched the personal computer revolution. Hugo Gernsback's Amazing Stories is regarded as the first dedicated science fiction magazine and every year World Science Fiction Society gives the Hugo Awards for the best science fiction and fantasy works.

== Origins ==
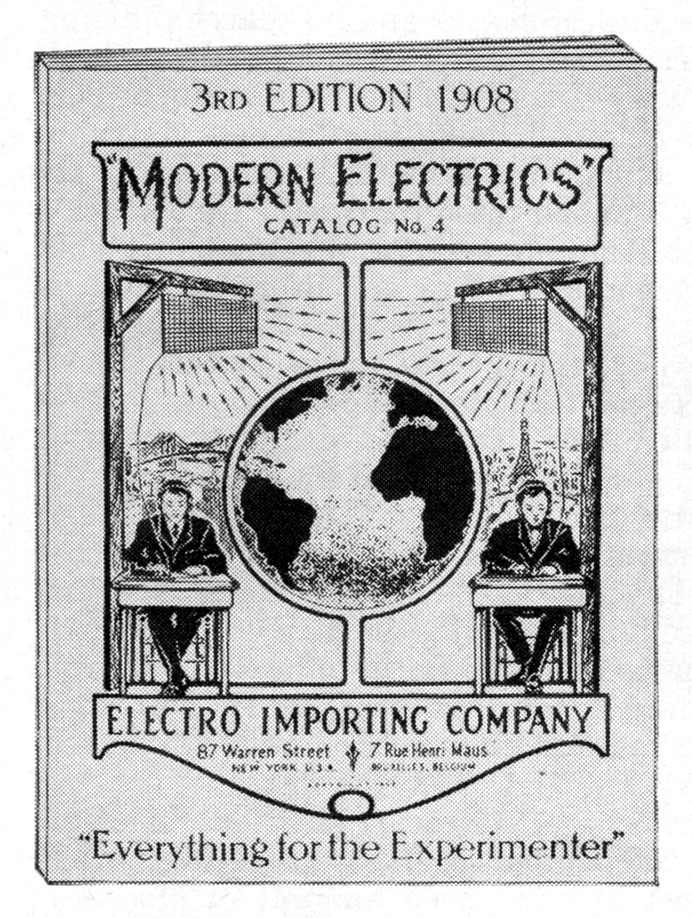
Electro Importing Catalog

Hugo Gernsback was born in Luxembourg in 1884 and he became fascinated with electricity as a boy. While studying electrical engineering at a Technikum University in Bingen, Germany; he built a simple radio transmitter and receiver. Gernsback also developed a powerful dry-cell battery but was unable to patent it in Europe. In February 1904 Gernsback emigrated to America hoping to sell his battery design to automobile companies and had modest success with this. Gernsback lived in a New York City boarding house where he met Lewis Coggeshall, a railroad telegraph operator. They found it difficult to purchase radio parts in New York City so in 1905 they decided to start the Electro Importing Company to sell European-imported radio components and electrical components by mail order. An early product was a spark-gap telegraph transmitter with a one-mile range that was first advertised in the November 25, 1905, issue of Scientific American and sold for $8.50. Another product featured by the Electro Importing Company was Gernsback's own Telimco Wireless Telegraph, the name of which comes from the letters in the catalog's name. The set was sold starting in 1905, with the lowest-priced option starting at $6.00 The low price caused trouble, however, as Gernsback received accusations of fraud from people who believed the Telimco was too cheap to be a product of actual quality. Upon investigation, Gernsback and Coggeshall were able to prove to a police officer who had come to the Electro Importing Company's office that the Telimco did work as advertised. The Electro Importing Company catalogs soon had 64 pages of products and detailed technical articles on how to use the components offered for sale. The catalog used the title Modern Electrics in 1908 before the magazine was launched. The catalog continued to grow and used various titles. The catalog reached several prominent radio entrepreneurs, including Lee de Forest, who read the catalog while developing his Audion tube, Edgar Felix, who purchased headphones from the store on Fulton Street, and Stanley Manning, a Detroit broadcaster who traveled to New York to see Gernsback's store. Gernsback bought Coggeshall's share of the company in 1907. To expand Electro Importing, Gernsback ran a classified ad in the January 27, 1908, New York Times looking for a new investor.

Partner wanted in well-established electrical manufacturing business; good chance for right party; have more orders than can fill; only parties with sufficient capital need apply. H. Gernsback, 108 Duane St.

Milton Hymes answered and with the new capital, Electro Importing moved to a larger building on Fulton Street and later opened two retail stores. Modern Electrics was launched as a magazine in April 1908. The Electro Importing Catalogs continued independently. This is the magazine where Gernsback wrote his first science fiction story "Ralph 124C 41+" in April 1911. Gernsback wanted to start a second magazine, Electrical Experimenter, so he sold Modern Electrics and the Modern Publishing Company to a business partner, Orland Ridenour. The last issue with Hugo Gernsback as editor was March 1913. The first issue of Electrical Experimenter was May 1913. Modern Publishing acquired Electrician and Mechanic and merged it with Modern Electrics in January 1914 to become Modern Electrics and Mechanics. After a series of mergers and title changes the magazine became Popular Science Monthly in October 1915 and is still published today.

Hugo Gernsback frequently formed new partnerships with investors for a new magazine or other opportunity (such as a radio station). The Experimenter Publishing Company was incorporated in March 1915. The corporate officers were Hugo Gernsback, his brother Sidney Gernsback and Milton Hymes. Hymes had worked with Gernsback since 1908 and was an officer in both the Electro Importing Company and the Experimenter Publishing Company. Hymes died in a railroad accident in 1917. Robert W. De Mott replaced Hymes as advertising manager and corporate secretary.

== Magazines ==
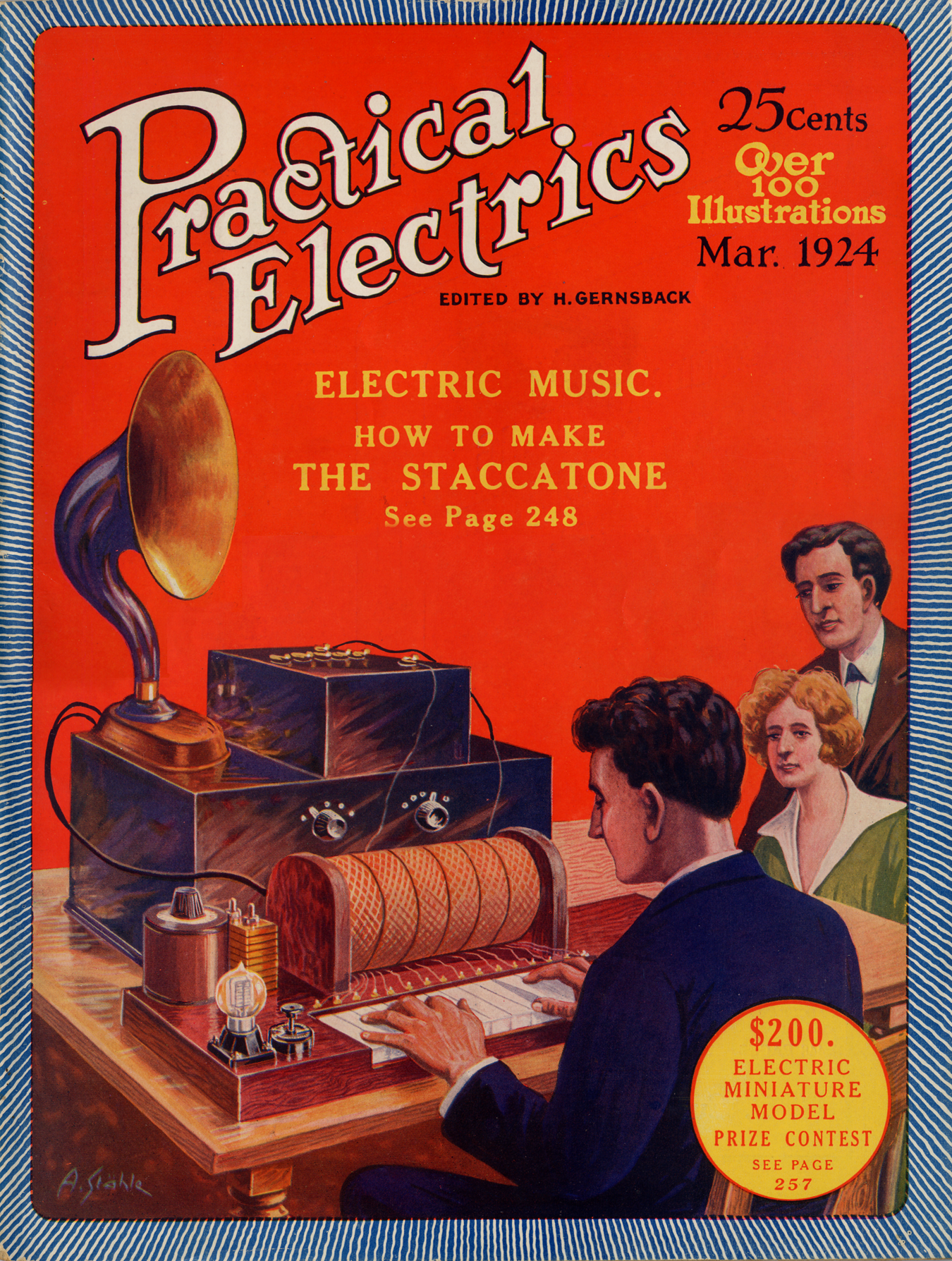
Staccatone music synthesizer

Electrical Experimenter, introduced in May 1913, was initially published by the Electro Importing Company. The new Experimenter Publishing Company became the publisher with the May 1915 issue. The June 1918 cover had a sub-title of "Science and Invention", and the contents expanded to include general science, chemistry and mechanics. It continued to publish fiction stories. Science and Invention became the primary title in August 1920 and the last issue was in August 1931.

Experimenter Publishing created a magazine devoted to radio in July 1919, Radio Amateur News. The title was shortened to Radio News in June 1920. The magazine was very successful. It appealed to amateur radio operators and to hobbyists wanting to listen to the new commercial radio stations. Radio News, under various titles, was published until 1985.

The articles in Radio News were technically sophisticated so a new magazine, Practical Electrics, was created to appeal to a wider audience. This was initially published by Practical Electrics Company, a subsidiary of Experimenter Publishing. The first issue was November 1921. The magazine never printed more than 60,000 copies; the old Electrical Experimenter had 100,000 readers and Radio News now had 400,000. In the November 1924 issue Hugo Gernsback wrote "We therefore decided last month to bring back the old Electrical Experimenter once and for all"; the title became The Experimenter. The magazine was merged into Science and Invention in February 1926.

=== Other publications ===
The Consolidated Radio Call Book Company published blueprints and instructions for building radio equipment. These were sold to amateur radio operators and hobbyist by radio parts stores across the United States. Hugo Gernsback was president and R. W. DeMott was Secretary of this publicly traded company. The name was changed to the Consrad Company in June 1923. The Electro Importing Company was selling more books and fewer radio parts and transitioned into a publishing company. Consrad began distributing the E. I. Co. books to radio dealers. ) The Radio Specialty Company, "RASCO", took over the parts business. In 1926 the Consrad started the Radio Listeners' Guide and Call Book, a quarterly magazine. Sidney Gernsback was the editor and his name appeared on the cover. A typical issue had 50 pages of radio station listing and 100 pages of detailed radio construction plans.

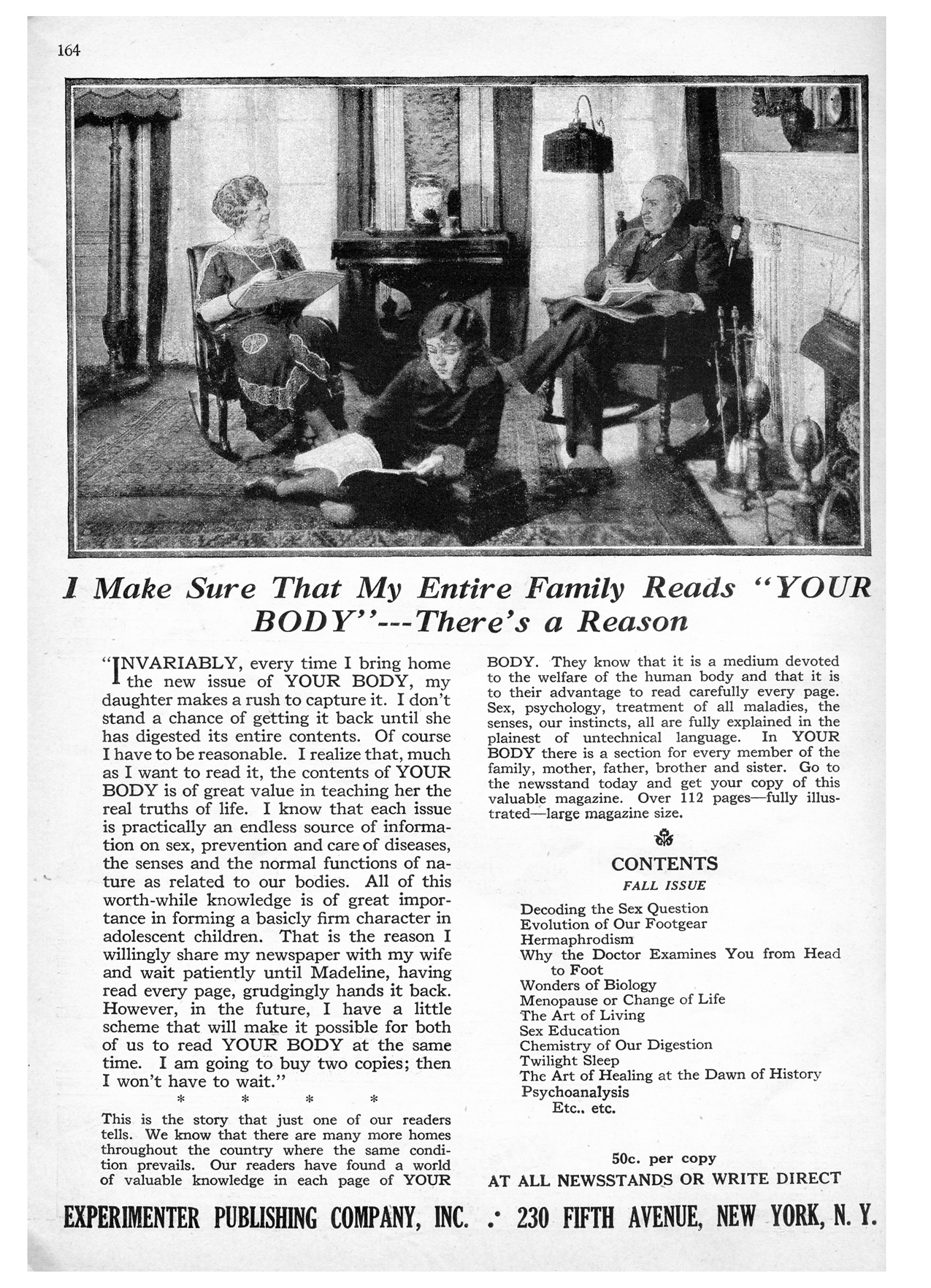
Your Body advertisement

Sidney Gernsback published a hard bound Radio Encyclopedia for that was independent of Experimenter Publishing or the Consrad Company. It claimed to cover every phase of radio with "over 1930 separate definitions, 549 illustrations, a complete cross index, and many other special features." The Encyclopedia was not part of the bankruptcy. Hugo Gernsback also published magazines that appealed to a general audience. Motor Camper & Tourist was a travel guide for those that toured the United States by automobile. The July 1924 issue started a series about driving and camping across the country from New York City to San Francisco. Another was Your Body, a guide to the operation and mechanics of the human body. An advertisement for the magazine claimed that "each issue is practically an endless source of information on sex, prevention and care of diseases, the senses and the normal functions of nature as related to our bodies." Time magazine reviewed the first issue with an article titled "Unsexing Sex". Gernsback promoted it as a magazine for the whole family but Time felt the target audience was "radio bugs" (a 1920s term for geeks).

Hugo Gernsback had always published fiction stories in his magazines. He wanted stories that promoted imaginative uses of science and technology. This "scientific fiction" needed to be somewhat plausible. The August 1923 Science and Invention had an astronaut in a space suit on the cover and the issue was devoted to scientific fiction. Gernsback began developing a scientific fiction magazine and Amazing Stories was launched with the April 1926 issue.

By 1928, Experimenter Publishing and Consrad were publishing a wide selection of books. In addition the radio titles, there were general interest books like Houdini's Spirit Exposes, Beauty Secrets, and Popular Tricks. These were prominently advertised in their magazines.

== WRNY ==
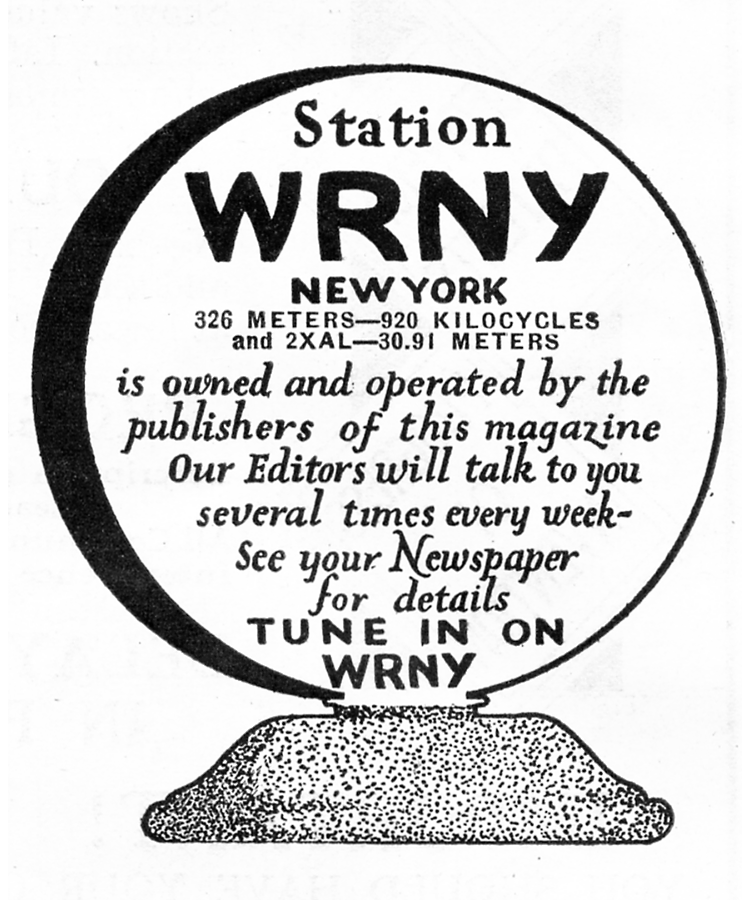
Ad promoting magazines and radio station

KDKA in Pittsburgh was the first commercial radio station in the United States, having made their first broadcast in November 1920. By 1925 there were over 500 broadcast stations in the United States. KDKA was operated by Westinghouse Electric to help sell radio receivers. In addition to radio equipment manufacturers, many publishers were starting stations. Experimenter Publishing applied for and was granted a radio station license to transmit at 1160 kilocycles (kHz) with the call sign WRNY. (Over the next three years they would use 800 kHz, 1070 kHz, 970 kHz, 920 kHz and finally 1010 kHz.) The state of the art studio was in a room on the 18th floor of the Roosevelt Hotel in New York City and the 500 watt transmitter located on the hotel roof. The first broadcast was on June 12, 1925, and was reported in the New York Times. The opening speaker was former Senator Chauncey Depew followed by the "father of radio", Lee de Forest. This was followed by live musical entertainment. The Times noted Hugo Gernsback's Staccatone signal generator that was used before the station signed on and signing the end of programs. The Staccatone was a primitive music synthesizer described in the March 1924 Practical Electrics magazine. Experimenter Publishing used the radio station and the magazines to promote each other. The station call letters, WRNY, appeared on each magazine cover.

By 1927 there were over fifty radio stations and 1.5 million radio sets in the New York metropolitan area. There were so many stations it was common for stations to share the same frequency at different times during the day. The Radio Act of 1912 did not mention broadcasting and it was not clear who controlled radio stations, the states or the federal government. Early radio receivers were not very selective and there were frequent disputes over interference between stations with adjacent frequencies. In November 1926, WRNY (800 kHz) moved its transmitter from the Roosevelt Hotel to Coytesville, New Jersey (directly across the river from Manhattan). Radio station WHN (830 kHz) claimed this blocked their signal and alleged WRNY was a "pirate" broadcaster. In 1927 the Federal Radio Commission was established with the authority to regulate broadcast stations.

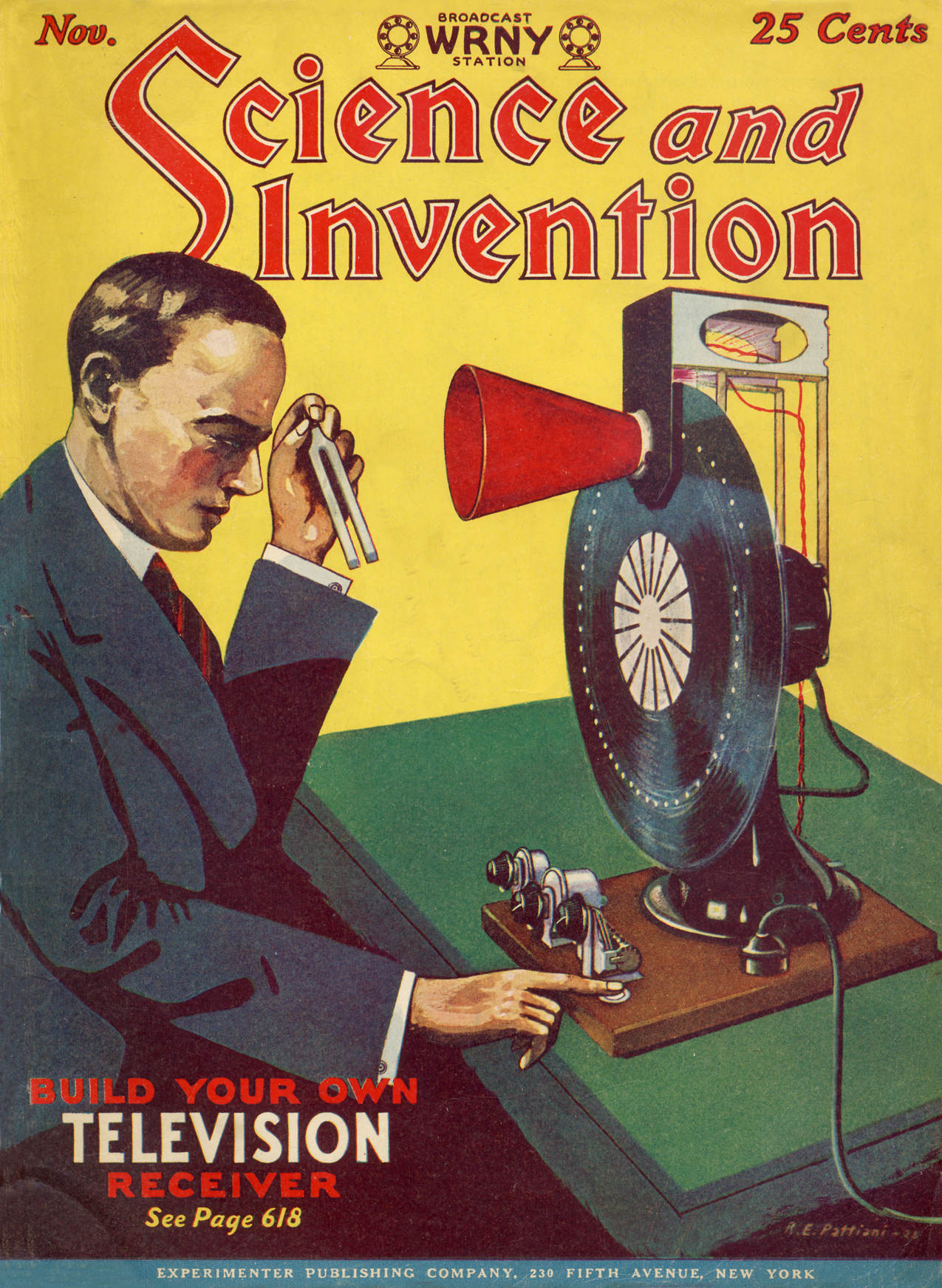
Home-made television in Science and Invention (November 1928)

Hugo Gernsback first wrote about television in the December 1909 issue of Modern Electrics and had reported on the technical advances in his magazines. By 1925 mechanical scanning television systems were becoming available with resolutions of up to 60 scan lines. These mechanical systems were simple enough that a hobbyist could construct a television receiver. Vladimir K. Zworykin and Philo Farnsworth were developing electronic scanning systems that were the precursors of modern television. These would not be available for another decade.

In April 1928, Pilot Electric Manufacturing and WRNY announced that television broadcast would begin that fall. Pilot would provide the transmitting equipment. Pilot also sold the receivers but Experimenter Publishing magazines provided complete plans that allowed readers to build their own television. The system used by WRNY had 48 scan lines with 7.5 frames per second. The image was about 1.5 inches square. This low resolution picture (without sound) could be transmitted in the 5 kHz audio bandwidth of an AM radio station. (The NTSC 525 line standard definition television signal is allotted a 6 MHz bandwidth.) The first test broadcast was on August 12, 1928. Others had been transmitting television before this but WRNY was the first to have a regular scheduled program. Hugo Gernsback estimated that there were around 2000 television receivers in the New York area.

== Bankruptcy ==
=== Background ===
By 1927 the expenses exceeded the income of the Experimenter Publishing Company. The radio station had a stream of advertising revenue but there was the new transmitter facility in New Jersey plus the investment in television equipment. WRNY was losing around $50,000 a year by 1927. Hugo Gernsback received a salary of $50,000 per year; his brother Sidney received $39,000. As a comparison, the Governor of New York State earned $25,000 a year. In February 1927 the Experimenter Publishing Company leased the entire sixteenth floor of 230 Fifth Avenue to be used as executive offices. In an effort to boost the circulation, Hugo Gernsback announce in the April 1927 Radio News that the radio project blue prints that had been selling for one or two dollars were now free.

The largest expenses for a magazine publisher are paper and printing. The publisher has to print enough copies to supply every outlet. At the end of the month the distributor would return the unsold copies to the publisher for a credit. Experimenter Publishing had four or five monthly magazines so this was a considerable expense. By 1928 the creditors had installed resident accountants at Experimenter Publishing to review the expenditures.

=== Proceedings ===
The largest creditors were the paper supplier, Bulkley Dunton Co. ($154,406), Art Color Printing Co. of Dunellen, N.J. ($152,908) and Edward Langer Printing Co., ($14,614). On February 20, 1929, an involuntary petition in bankruptcy was filed against the Experimenter Publishing Company on behalf of Daniel A. Walters ($2,030), Marie E. Bachmann ($2,094) and Robert Halpern ($2,095). The fact that minor creditors forced the bankruptcy had nourished various conspiracy theories over earlier years. However, in reality, S. John Block's law offices had Bulkley and Art Color as clients: Walters & Halpern – junior lawyers – and Bachman – legal sectretary – all worked for Block and each had one of the very many past-due bills assigned over to them to commence proceedings. The total liabilities were estimated at $600,000 and assets at $182,000. Federal Judge Mack appointed the Irving Trust Company as the receiver. Hugo Gernsback spoke to the press afterward and said: "Plans are being formulated to reorganize and continue publication as heretofore. I am authorized to say this by the receiver."

The April 1929 issues of Radio News (on the newsstand March 10), Amazing Stores and Science and Invention were the last to feature Hugo Gernsback as editor. The Irving Trust appointed publisher Bergan A. MacKinnon as circulation manager and Arthur Lynch as managing editor. The WRNY stayed on the air and the magazines did not miss an issue. The bankruptcy proceedings were enthusiastically covered in the news and gossip columns of the New York City press.

The creditors of Experimenter Publishing and the Consrad Company reviewed bids at a March 28 hearing before the bankruptcy referee. Two publishers, B. A. MacKinnon and Macfadden Publications, entered similar bids that would almost pay the creditors in full. After these two complete bids were read, Chester Cuthell then offered $60,000 for the radio stations. The MacKinnon offer was revised to allow the separate sale of the stations, Macfadden wanted to keep the stations. Motion Picture Publications offered $50,000 cash for Amazing Stories. Fawcett Publishing offered $30,000 cash for Science and Invention. The Robert McBride Company offered $300,000 for Science and Invention and Amazing Stories. The hearing was adjourned for a week to allow the creditor's committee to evaluate the bids.

At the April 3 hearing, Mr. MacKinnon agreed to pay $200,000 now and $300,000 more in September. Mr. Cuthell acting for the Curtiss Aeroplane and Motor Company would pay the other $100,000 for the radio stations. After administration expenses, the creditors were paid 95 cents on the dollar. The attorneys handling receivership said this was the first time they had seen a forced sale pay off the creditors in full. The Irving Trust Company's decision to keep the magazines and stations running avoided an early sale at a sacrifice price. The first bid for complete company was $100,000. The first offer for the radio stations was only $7,500. Here is a New York Times account of the final bidding.

The final bidding for the radio stations was spirited. Carl W. Kirchway, acting for The New York Evening Journal, bid $90,000 and then raised the bid to $100,000. Mr. Kirchway asked for and obtained a recess to enable him to reach William R. Hearst in California. It was reported that Mr. Hearst could not be reached and Mr. Kirchway decided that he was not authorized to exceed Mr. Cuthell's bid.

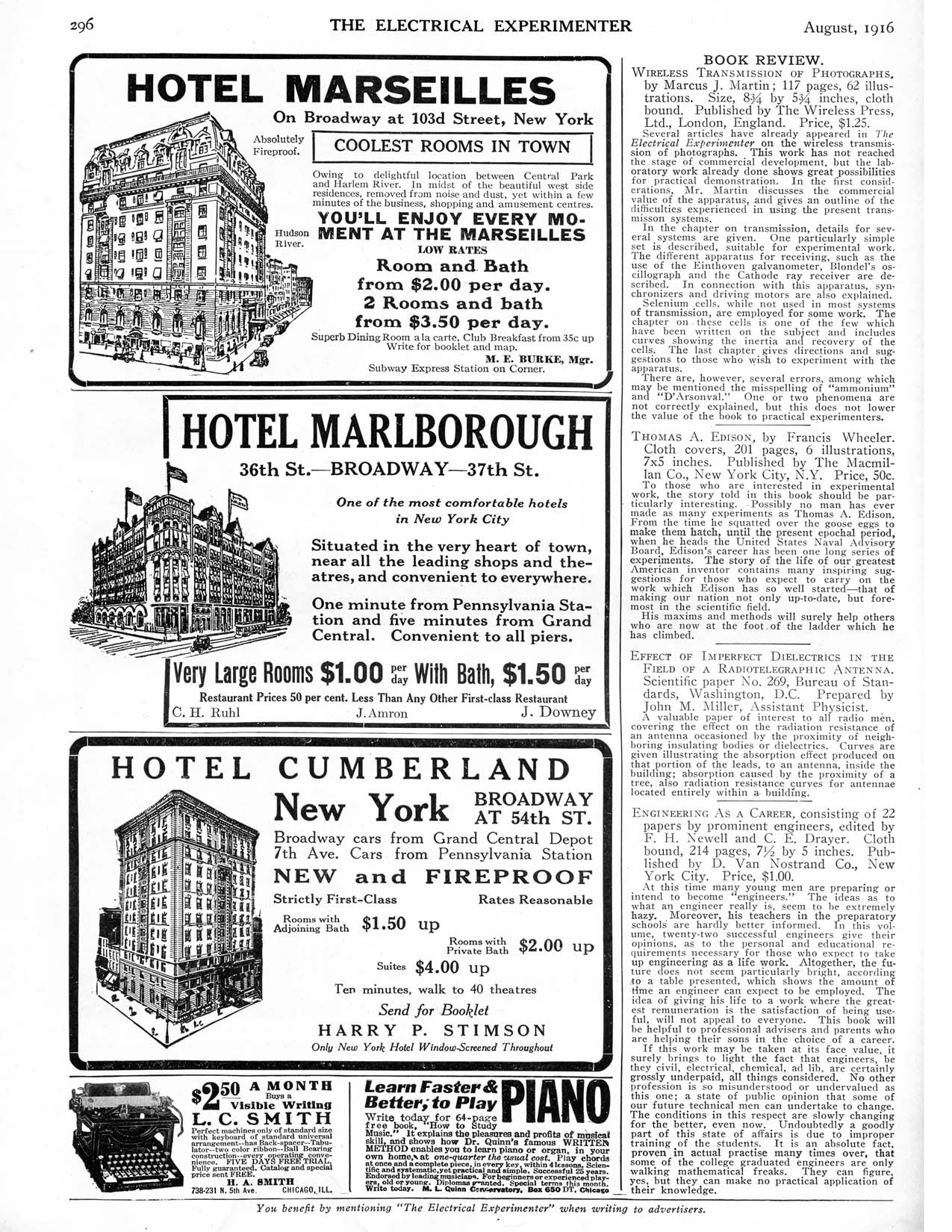
Hotel filler ads

Hugo and Sidney Gernsback were questioned at an April 19 hearing about the operation of the Experimenter Publishing and the Consrad Company. They were questioned by attorneys for the Irving Trust Company and B. A. MacKinnon "to discover any assets which may have been concealed or diverted." Attorneys for Mr. MacKinnon, questioned the method of the bankrupt companies in allowing hotels space for advertising in the magazines published by the Gernsbacks for trade bills (vouchers) instead of cash. The Gernsbacks explained that the space assigned to the hotels was unsold at the press date and the ads were "fillers". The trade bills were given to wholesalers, advertisers and others with whom they did business.

Hugo Gernsback was also asked about letters soliciting subscribers for his new company, Gernsback Publications, Inc. and if the subscription lists of the bankrupt firm had been used. "Mr. Gernsback emphatically denied that such lists had been used."

"Mr. Gernsback said after the hearing that his new magazines would be Radio Craft, Science Wonder Stories and Air Wonder Stories and that the first issues would be out in June."

The Experimenter Publishing bankruptcy made it to the U.S. Supreme Court in 1933. The state of New York missed the deadline for filing claims but still wanted the back taxes the Experimenter Publishing owed. The court ruled that the Constitution gave control of bankruptcy to the federal government and the states would have to follow the rules and procedures like any other creditor.

== After the bankruptcy ==
=== Gernsback Publications ===
Gernsback was quickly able to raise capital for a new publishing company. The June issue of Science Wonder Stories was on the newsstand on May 3, 1929. This was one of two magazines Gernsback created to compete with Amazing Stories; his Air Wonder Stories appeared six weeks later. They were merged into Wonder Stories after a year. The July issues of Radio Craft appeared on the newsstand on June 5, 1929, three months after Gernsback lost Radio News. There was a new Everyday Science and Mechanics to compete with Science and Invention.

Hugo Gernsback often published articles about the history of his magazines, but the bankruptcy was always ignored. The April 1958 Radio-Electronics (formerly Radio Craft) has a 16-page story on Gernsback's 50 year publishing history. Here is the complete description of the bankruptcy: "In the spring of 1929, Radio News, Science and Invention, Amazing Stories and associated magazines were sold to other interest. Radio News of April, 1929, was the last Gernsback issue."

The eve of the Great Depression was not an ideal time to start new magazines but Gernsback persevered. Radio Craft and successor titles were in print until January 2003. Gernsback decided to focus on radio magazines and added Short Wave Craft in June 1930 and Television News in 1931. Wonder Stories was sold to Thrilling Publications in 1936 and it was in print until 1955. Science and Mechanics was sold to Virgil Angerman in 1937 and it was in print until the 1970s (as late as May 1974).

=== Experimenter Publications ===
B. A. MacKinnon immediately renamed the company to Experimenter Publications and then to Radio-Science Publications in November 1930. MacKinnon's plan was to pay off the debt of acquiring the magazine with the revenue from the magazines. The Depression drove many advertisers out of business and made magazines a luxury for many readers. Radio-Science Publications ceased operations with the August 1931 issues. Bernarr Macfadden's newly formed Teck Publishing Corporation took over with the September 1931 issue. Radio News and Amazing Stories were continued but Science and Invention was sold and absorbed into Popular Mechanics magazine.

Radio News and Amazing Stories were in poor financial health when Ziff-Davis acquired them in January 1938. They were listed as publisher in the March issues but the April issues were the first produced under their control. Radio News was published by Ziff-Davis under several titles until 1985. They published Amazing Stories until 1965 when it was sold to Ultimate Publishing.

=== WRNY ===
Immediately after the bankruptcy auction, the Aviation Radio Station, Inc. was formed to take over the WRNY radio stations. C. M. Keys, president of the Curtiss Aeroplane and Motor Company, provided the financial backing for the new company. Chester Cuthell, the attorney who was at the auction, was the president and Walter Lemmon was the general manager. The goal of the station was to promote aviation. The Federal Radio Commission had to approve station license transfer and any changes to the station. Mr. Cuthell asked the commission for more frequencies as he said that he and his partners had up to $2,000,000 to spend on the stations. The commission approved the license transfers and improvements to the existing stations.

In August 1929 Aviation Radio moved the studios from the Roosevelt Hotel to 27 West Fifty-Seventh Street. They also installed a new 1000 watt transmitter with automatic frequency control and new speech amplifiers at their plant in Coytesville NJ. These upgrades improved the range and sound quality of their broadcast. The short wave station, 2XLA, increased is power to 15,000 watts. The radio stations format was changed; the Jazz music was prohibited and replaced with presentations devoted to aviation and aviators. On a show about women aviators, Amelia Earhart recounted her recent transcontinental flight. The station gave hourly weather reports of aviators.

After 1928 WRNY was at 1010 kilocycles (kHz) and shared the frequency with 3 other stations. This is a typical broadcast schedule: WRNY started at 10:00 AM, WHN followed at 1:30 PM, WPAP followed at 7:00 PM, and finally WRNY closed out the broadcast day from 9:30 PM to midnight. WQAO, own by the Calvary Baptist Church, broadcast three programs on Sunday and one on Wednesday. The owner of WHN, Metro-Goldwyn-Mayer, bought the other stations in 1933 and WHN used 1010 kHz full-time starting in January 1934 . The stations call letters were later changed to WMGM; the station is today's WFAN, while WEPN replaced it on the frequency.

== Experimenter Publishing magazines ==
- Electrical Experimenter, May 1913 to July 1920. Became Science and Invention.
- Radio News, July 1919 to April 1959. Became Electronics World
- Science and Invention, August 1920 to August 1931.
- Practical Electrics, November 1921 to October 1924. Became The Experimenter.
- Motor Camper & Tourist, June 1924 to August 1926 (or later)
- The Experimenter, November 1924 to February 1926. Merged into Science and Invention.
- Radio Listeners' Guide and Call Book, Spring 1926 to Spring 1929
- Amazing Stories, April 1926 to April 2005
- Your Body Quarterly, Fall 1926 to Summer 1929
- How to Make It,
- Television, only two issues, 1927 and 1928

== See also ==
- Amazing Stories
- Electrical Experimenter
- Radio News

== Notes ==
- Over the years several dates have been given for the first advertisement of the "Telimco Wireless Telegraph Outfit" in Scientific American. Hugo Gernsback gave the date of November 1904 in a radio address on November 10, 1921. and later gave the date of January 13, 1906 in a 1938 issues of his magazine, Radio Craft. Thomas White found the earliest advertisement in the November 25, 1905 issue of Scientific American. It was the first of a series of advertisements that appeared every two weeks. There was also an ad that appeared in the January 13 issue.
