= The Electrical Experimenter =

Defunct American technical science magazine

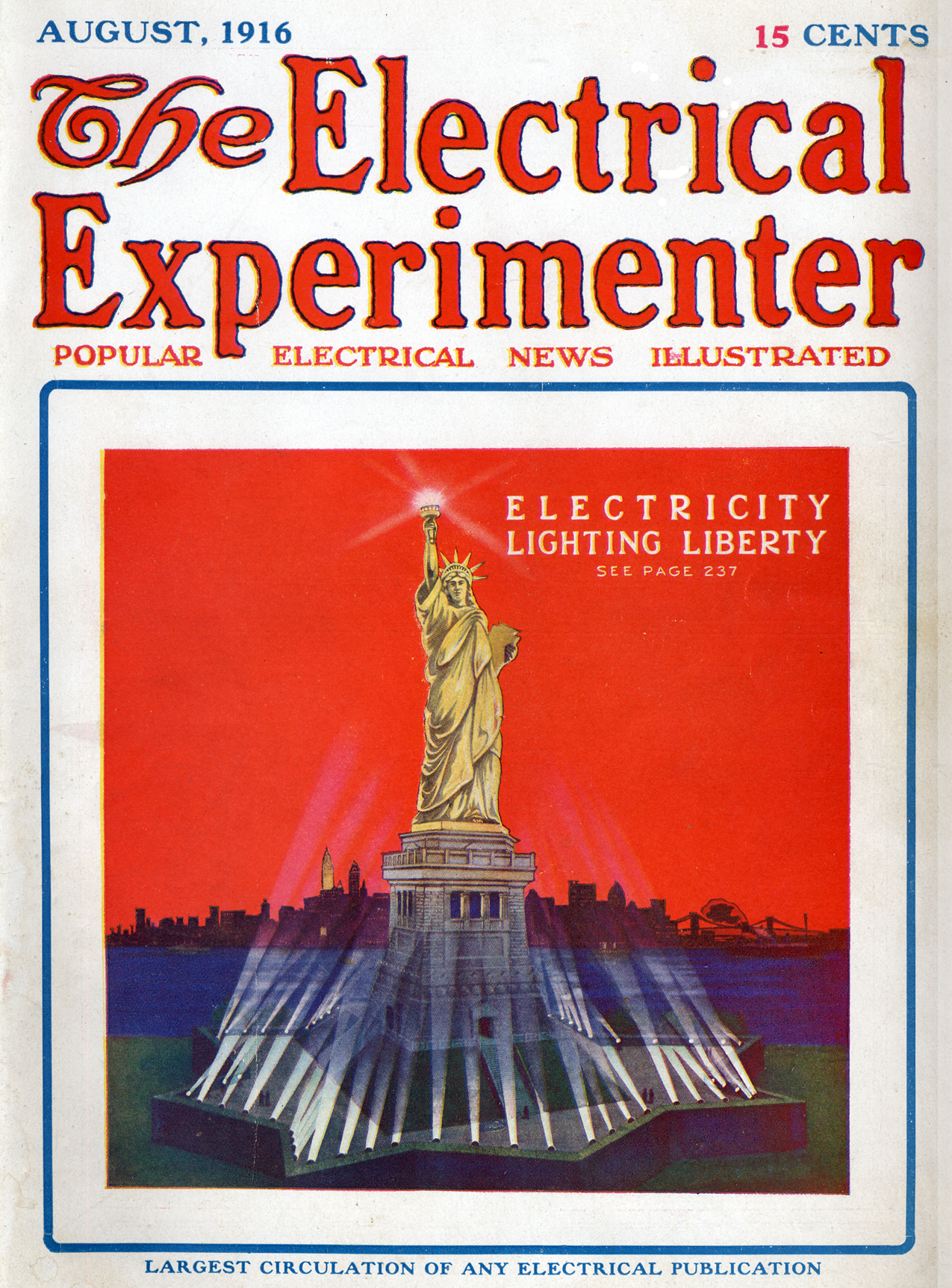
- Electricity Lighting Liberty, August 1916
- Editor: Hugo Gernsback
- Categories: Science
- Frequency: Monthly
- Publisher: Hugo Gernsback
- First issue: May 1913
- Final issue Number: July 1920; Vol. 8 No. 3
- Company: Experimenter Publishing
- Country: USA
- Based in: New York City
- Language: English
- OCLC: 8740783

The Electrical Experimenter was an American technical science magazine that was published monthly. It was established in May 1913, as the successor to Modern Electrics, a combination of a magazine and mail-order catalog that had been published by Hugo Gernsback starting in 1908. The Electrical Experimenter continued from May 1913 to July 1920 under that name, focusing on scientific articles about radio, and continued with a broader focus as Science and Invention until August 1931.

The magazine was edited by Hugo Gernsback until March 1929, when the Experimenter Publishing empire of Sidney and Hugo Gernsback was forced into bankruptcy; after that date it was edited by Arthur H. Lynch.

Under the editorship of Gernsback, it also published some early science fiction; he published several of his own stories in the magazine starting in 1915, and encouraged others through a 1916 editorial arguing that a "real electrical experimenter, worthy of the name" must have imagination and a vision for the future. Between August 1917 and July 1919, Nikola Tesla wrote five articles for the magazine, and also published parts of his autobiography in segments in several issues in 1919.
