= Prime Press =

Small press specialty publishing house

Prime Press, Inc. was a science fiction and fantasy small press specialty publishing house founded in 1947. It published a number of interesting science fiction books in its brief four-year lifespan.

It was founded by Oswald Train, James A. Williams, Alfred C. Prime, and Armand E. Waldo who were all members of the Philadelphia Science Fiction Society (PSFS). The founders originally intended that the press focus on writers living in the Philadelphia area or associated with PSFS. In 1950, Prime and Waldo asked Williams and Train to buy them out. Williams died suddenly in 1951. Train was unable to continue the press on his own. Their next book was to have been Lost Continents, by L. Sprague de Camp. Prime had printed the signatures, but handed the project off to Gnome Press who bound them with a new title page.

== Works published ==
- The Mislaid Charm, by Alexander M. Phillips (1947)
- Venus Equilateral, by George O. Smith (1947)
- Equality; or, A History of Lithconia, Anonymous (1947)
- ... And Some Were Human, by Lester del Rey (1948)
- It!, by Theodore Sturgeon (1948)
- Without Sorcery, by Theodore Sturgeon (1948)
- The Torch, by Jack Bechdolt (1948)
- Lest Darkness Fall, by L. Sprague de Camp (1949)
- The Homunculus, by David H. Keller, M.D. (1949)
- Lords of Creation, by Eando Binder (1949)
- Exiles of Time, by Nelson S. Bond (1949)
- The Eternal Conflict, by David H. Keller, M.D. (1949)
- Three Hundred Years Hence, by Mary Griffith (1950)
- The Incomplete Enchanter, by L. Sprague de Camp (1950)
- Nomad, by George O. Smith (1950)
- The Wolf Leader, by Alexandre Dumas, translated and edited by L. Sprague de Camp (1950)
- The Lady Decides, by David H. Keller, M.D. (1950)
- The Blind Spot, by Austin Hall and Homer Eon Flint (1951)
