= Three Hundred Years Hence =

1836 novel by Mary Griffith

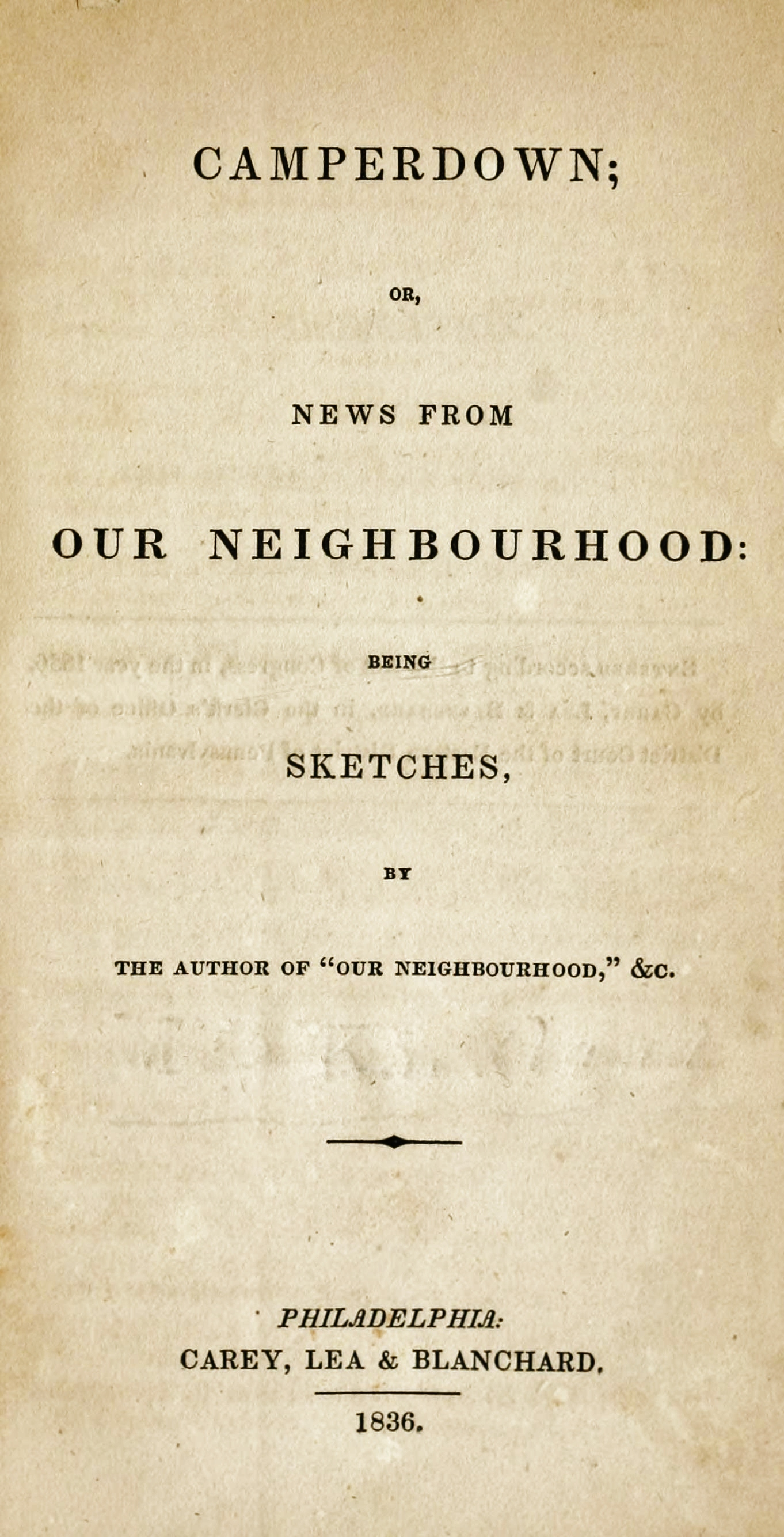
- First edition title page
- Author: Mary Griffith
- Language: English
- Genre: Utopian Science fiction novel
- Publisher: Prime Press
- Publication date: 1836
- Publication place: United States
- Media type: Print (Hardback)
- Pages: 131
- ISBN: 978-1514738016
- OCLC: 3253783
- Text: Three Hundred Years Hence at Wikisource

Three Hundred Years Hence is a utopian science fiction novel by author Mary Griffith, published in 1836. It was the first utopian novel written in the United States. The novel was originally published in 1836 as part of Griffith's collection, Camperdown, or News from Our Neighborhood, and later published by Prime Press in 1950 in an edition of 300 copies.

== Plot introduction ==
The novel concerns a hero who falls into a deep sleep and awakens in the Utopian states of Pennsylvania, New Jersey and New York.

== Influences and successors ==
Writers of utopian fiction generally need to set their imagined societies either in a remote place (as in Sir Thomas More's original Utopia and many imitators), or in a different time. Griffith's story was likely inspired by Memoirs of the Year 2500 by French writer Louis-Sébastien Mercier. Griffith was however the earliest American writer to project her protagonist into the future to encounter a vastly improved social order. Many successors would follow her example; most famously, Edward Bellamy used the same trick in his Looking Backward (1888), as did many of the writers who produced sequels and responses to his work. The same tactic is exploited in John Macnie's The Diothas (1883), W. H. Hudson's A Crystal Age (1887), Elizabeth Corbett's New Amazonia (1889), Bradford Peck's The World a Department Store (1900), Charlotte Perkins Gilman's Moving the Mountain (1911), and other works.

Another, later book, published in 1881 by William Delisle Hay, was given the same title (Three Hundred Years Hence or A Voice From Posterity), probably in ignorance of Griffith's earlier but then-obscure work.

== Critical reception ==
Reviewing the 1950 edition, Boucher and McComas characterized the novel as "an odd and delightful item of 1836 dealing with a strongly feminist future.".

== Publication history ==
- 1836, US, Carey, Lea & Blanchard OCLC 12851342, Pub date 1836, Hardback, included in Camperdown, or News from Our Neighborhood
- 1950, US, Prime Press OCLC 3253783, Pub date 1950, Hardback, first separate publication
- 1975, US, Gregg Press ISBN 0-8398-2303-7, Pub date 1975, Hardback
