= The Year 2440 =

1771 novel by Louis-Sébastien Mercier

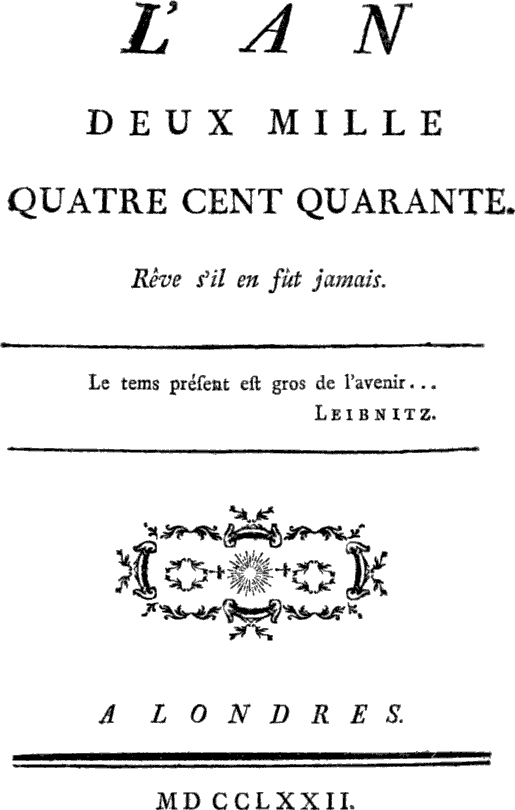
- Title page, L'An 2440, rêve s'il en fut jamais (1772 London edition)
- Author: Louis-Sébastien Mercier
- Original title: L'An 2440, rêve s'il en fut jamais
- Translator: William Hooper
- Language: French
- Genre: Science fiction
- Publisher: Van Harrevelt
- Publication date: 1771
- Publication place: France
- English publication date: 1772

L'An 2440, rêve s'il en fut jamais (literally, in English, The Year 2440: A Dream If Ever There Was One; but the title has been rendered into English as Memoirs of the Year Two Thousand Five Hundred or Memoirs of the Year 2500, and also as Astraea's Return, or The Halcyon Days of France in the Year 2440: A Dream) is a 1771 novel by Louis-Sébastien Mercier.

It has been described as one of the most popular and controversial novels of the 18th century, one of the earliest works of science fiction, and the first work of utopian fiction set in the future rather than at a distant place in the present.

== Plot ==
The novel describes the adventures of an unnamed man who, after engaging in a heated discussion with a philosopher friend about the injustices of Paris, falls asleep and finds himself in a Paris several centuries into the future. He wanders through the changed city, eventually ending up in the ruins of the Palace of Versailles. Mercier's hero notes everything that catches his fancy in this futuristic Paris. Public space and the justice system have been reorganized. Citizens' garb is comfortable and practical. Hospitals are effective and science-based. There are no monks, priests, nuns, prostitutes, beggars, dancing masters (i.e., dance teachers), pastry chefs, standing armies, slavery, arbitrary arrest, taxes, guilds, foreign trade, coffee, tea, or tobacco: such occupations, institutions, and products have been adjudged to be useless and immoral – as has much previously written literature, which has been willingly destroyed by the future librarians, who proudly display their library, reduced to a single room of only the most valuable works.

Written only 18 years before the French Revolution of 1789, the book describes a future secular, liberal, modern and pacifist France that has been established through a peaceful revolution led by a "philosopher-king" who has set up a system resembling a parliamentary monarchy. The future utopian, egalitarian France is portrayed as having no religion and no military.

== Editions and translations ==
Everett C. Wilkie Jr. notes that there have been many misstatements concerning the novel's publication history and Mercier's bibliography in general.

According to Evelyn L. Forget, Mercier finished the first manuscript in 1768, though Wilkie writes that parts of the book clearly date to 1770, as they reference events of that year. Sources also vary as to the year of the book's first edition, citing 1770 or 1771. Wilkie writes it might have been "pulled off the press so late in 1770 that it was dated 1771, the year it was actually sold", but "despite evidence to the contrary [as no known edition dating to 1770 has been found], scholarly practice has made the supposed 1770 edition of this novel an enduring bibliographical ghost". The confusion is partly the fault of Mercier himself, who at different times gave both dates as the year of the first edition's publication. Wilkie concludes that the only fact that Mercier was consistent about is that the first edition was published in Amsterdam by E. van Harrevelt, and existing evidence strongly favors 1771 – probably the summer – as the correct date of publication.

Due to its controversial criticism of the Ancien Régime and portrayal of a secular future, the novel was at first published illicitly, appearing anonymously, smuggled into France, and sold by underground booksellers. It was banned in France; in Spain by the Inquisition in 1778, supposedly burned by the Spanish king himself; and by the Holy See in 1773, placed on the Index Librorum Prohibitorum. Nevertheless, it quickly became an underground bestseller in France, with over twenty editions during Mercier's lifetime, as well as a number of translations abroad, with many unauthorized and sometimes altered editions. It has been described as "one of the eighteenth century's most successful books" and "one of the most controversial", with an estimated 60,000 copies in several languages printed during that time, provoking a gamut of contemporary evaluations. By the late 1770s Mercier admitted his authorship of the novel, and his name finally appeared in the 1791 edition, after the fall of the Ancien Régime; due to Mercier's late admission of authorship, some early versions were attributed to Rousseau or to Voltaire.

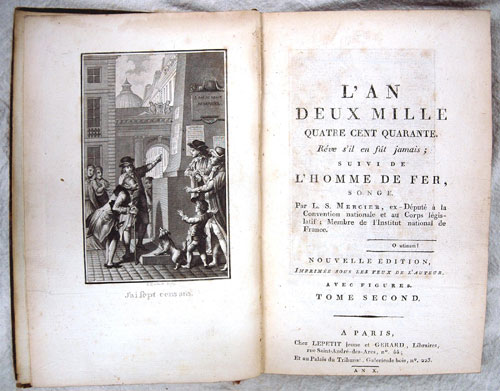
Louis-Sébastien Mercier, L'An deux mille quatre cent quarante (The Year 2440), vol. II, Paris, Lepetit Jeune et Gerard, 1802

It was first translated to English 1772 by William Hooper, and was the first utopia published in the United States: Thomas Jefferson and George Washington owned the first edition. Around the same time it was translated to Dutch and German, and a few years later into Italian. For the English edition, Hooper changed the title to Memoirs of the Year Two Thousand Five Hundred or Memoirs of the Year 2500 and added a number of footnotes. Mercier's choice of the somewhat awkward number 2440 might be related to it being his 700th birthday, whereas Hooper's title, described as "perplexing" by one scholar, is likely due to his preference for a simpler, rounded up title. Mercier published four editions (1771, 1774, 1786 and 1779), although there is some further controversy surrounding the 1774 edition, whose authorship Mercier later denied. The revised edition of 1786, now under the title L'an deux mille quatre cent quarante, Suivi de L'Homme de Fer: Songe (lit. The Year Two Thousand Four Hundred and Forty, Followed by The Iron Man: Dream, with L'Homme de Fer: Songe being a new, separate short story) was in turn partially translated to English by Harriot Augusta Freeman under another liberally changed title, Astraea's Return, or The Halcyon Days of France in the Year 2440: A Dream (according to the Encyclopedia of Science Fiction, as of 2019, no official English translation of the revised 1786 version exists). Neither the Hooper nor Freeman's translations were authorized by Mercier, and both translators openly admitted they did not know who the author was (he was first attributed as the author in English in an 1802 translation of his work).

Despite its popularity in the late 18th and early 19th centuries, the work was quickly eclipsed by others and "almost forgotten" by the 20th century.

== Discussion ==
L'An 2440 was one of Mercier's most famous works. It has been described as an "important milestone in the evolution of science fiction", particularly of the utopian fiction variety, "[in its time an] exceedingly popular [work of] proto-science fiction", and one of the first works in the genre focusing on the near future. Brian M. Stableford noted that "it laid the groundwork for the first theoretical discussion of the potential scope of futuristic fiction". Its plot structure, showing a familiar setting centuries into the future, instead of some far-away but contemporary place, has been credited with starting "the crucial shift of utopia from the imaginary island to future time". The book has also been described as "the first uchronia". However, earlier novels by other writers had been set in the near future. These include Francis Cheynell's Aulicus His Dream (1644), Jacques Guttin's Epigone. Histoire du siècle futur (1659), Samuel Madden's The Memoirs of the Twentieth Century (1733), and the anonymously written The Reign of George VI, 1900–1925 (1763). Mercier's novel has been described as having been inspired by the Enlightenment philosophy of Jean-Jacques Rousseau and by earlier utopian fiction such as Francis Bacon's New Atlantis (1626).

The Year 2440 also inspired many later authors. Some of the earliest works to be influenced by it are Betje Wolff's Holland in het jaar 2440 (1777), Vladimir Odoyevsky's The Year 4338: Petersburg Letters (1835), and Mary Griffith's Three Hundred Years Hence (1836). The growing speculation about the near future has been related to the growing popularity of the idea of progress.

One of the novel's themes is slavery, and support for its abolition, and even advocacy of some limited decolonization – tempered, however, by Mercier's view of Western culture (defined primarily on the superior example of French culture) and by his patriotism, which sees France as the world's new, benevolent hegemon. Another theme concerns gender equality, about which Mercier has again been described as both progressive and conservative: in his future world, marriages are based on love, divorce is legal, and dowries are abolished; but ideal women are "free" to devote themselves to life at home as "good wives and mothers".

The Year 2440 has been described as an important example of French pre-Revolutionary literary dissidence, and even as a veiled call to action – something made more explicit in the preface to later editions, in which Mercier urges the coming of an "age of progress and universal happiness", claiming his novel as prophetic (drawing much derision from contemporaries). Robert Darnton writes that "despite its self-proclaimed character of fantasy ... L'An 2440 demanded to be read as a serious guidebook to the future. It offered an astonishing new perspective: the future as a fait accompli and the present as a distant past. Who could resist the temptation to participate in such a thought experiment? And once engaged in it, who could fail to see that it exposed the rottenness of the society before his eyes, the Paris of the eighteenth century?"
