= The Eternal Conflict =

1949 novel by David H. Keller

- Title page for The Eternal Conflict (1949)
- Author: David H. Keller, M.D.
- Language: English
- Genre: Fantasy novel
- Publisher: Prime Press
- Publication date: 1949
- Publication place: United States
- Media type: Print (Hardback)
- Pages: 191 pp
- OCLC: 5723700

The Eternal Conflict is a fantasy novel by author David H. Keller, M.D. It was first published in 1949 by Prime Press in an edition of 400 copies, all of which were signed, numbered and slipcased. The novel was originally serialized in French in Le Primaires under the title Le Duel Sans Fin, in 1939.

== Plot introduction ==
The novel concerns two conflicts. One is between the sexes, the other in a woman's mind.
