= William Delisle Hay =

19th century British author and mycologist

William Delisle Hay (11 March 1853 – ) was a nineteenth-century British author and Fellow of the Royal Geographical Society from Bishopwearmouth, County Durham. He was best known for his mycological studies, writings on New Zealand, and a number of science fictional pulp novels, particularly the white supremacist and socialist "future fantasy" novel Three Hundred Years Hence; or, A Voice from Posterity (1881).

In his mycological writings, Hay observed a national superstition against "toadstools" in Britain, coining the term "fungophobia" to describe the prejudice.

Hay's short story "The Doom of the Great City" is considered by some to be the "first modern tale of urban apocalypse", and focused in part on the smogs of London, which had famously been so bad they had caused cattle to choke to death in 1873. The story's fatal smog is largely seen by the narrator as punishment for depravity, especially female prostitution. Three Hundred Years Hence (not to be mistaken with an earlier novel of the same title, by Mary Griffith) was similarly told from a future earth in which humanity lived in domed cities, and posited a socialist world, in which white people had virtually eliminated all non-white people from the world.

== Works ==
=== Fiction ===
- "The Doom of the Great City; Being the Narrative of a Survivor, Written A.D. 1942" (1880 short story)
- Three Hundred Years Hence; Or, A Voice from Posterity (1881)
- Blood: A Tragic Tale (1888)

=== Non-Fiction ===
- Brighter Britain!; Or, Settler and Maori in Northern New Zealand (1882) (available at Project Gutenberg)
- The South Sea Islanders and the Queensland Labour Trade: a record of voyages and experiences in the western Pacific, from 1875 to 1891 (1893) (several copies available at the Internet Archive)
- The Fungus-Hunter's Guide and Field Memorandum-Book (1887) (available at Google Books)
- An Elementary Text-Book of British Fungi (1887) (available at Internet Archive)

== Lectures and appearances ==
- 20 March 1883, "Social and Commercial Aspects of New Zealand", Meetings of the Society: Foreign and Colonial Section
