= The Brain Machine =

The Brain Machine may refer to:

- The Brain Machine (film), a 1955 British film directed by Ken Hughes
- The Brain Machine, a 1972 film directed by Joy N. Houck Jr., a.k.a. Gray Matter
- Alternative title for the 1959 American science fiction novel The Fourth "R"
