= Homunculus (disambiguation) =

A homunculus is a small artificial human or human-like being.

Homunculus, Homonculus or Homunculi may also refer to:

== Arts and entertainment ==
- Homunculus (novel), 1986 comic science fiction novel by James Blaylock
- The Homunculus, 1949 novel by David H. Keller
- Homunculus (manga), 2003 manga by Hideo Yamamoto
- The Homunculi, a group of characters from the anime and manga Fullmetal Alchemist
- Homunculus (film), a German sci-fi serial shown theatrically in 1916

=== Music ===
- "Homonculus", a song from the album Knife Play by the American band Xiu Xiu
- “Homonculus”, a song from the album Cross Collateral by the German jazz group Passport

== Science ==
- Homunculus (genus), an extinct genus of New World monkeys
- Homunculus Nebula, a nebula
- Cortical homunculus, a distorted representation of the human body
- Fetiform teratoma, a rare cyst having a fetal structure

== Other uses ==
- Homunculus argument, a fallacy arising most commonly in the theory of vision
