= Equality; or, A History of Lithconia =

1837 novel by an unknown author

- Dust-jacket from the Prime Press edition (1947)
- Author: Anonymous
- Language: English
- Genre: Utopioan Fantasy novel
- Publisher: Liberal Union
- Publication date: 1837
- Publication place: United States
- Media type: Print (Hardback)
- Pages: 124
- OCLC: 14521570

Equality; or, A History of Lithconia is a utopian fantasy novel. It is the first American utopian novel. The author is unknown, though Donald H. Tuck speculates that it could be Dr. James Reynolds, a zealous liberal crusader. The novel was originally serialized in 8 parts in the weekly newspaper, The Temple of Reason, beginning in 1802. It was first published in book form by the Liberal Union in 1837.

== Publication history ==
- 1802, US, The Temple of Reason, Pub date 15 May 1802, serialized in 8 parts
- 1837, US, Liberal Union OCLC 14521570, Pub date 1837, Hardback
- 1863, US, P. J. Mendum, Pub date 1863, Hardback
- 1947, US, Prime Press OCLC 220330658, Pub date 1947, Hardback, 500 copies printed
