= Tales from Underwood =

1952 collection of short stories by David H. Keller

- Jacket illustration by Ronald Clyne.
- Author: David H. Keller
- Cover artist: Ronald Clyne
- Language: English
- Genre: Fantasy, horror, science fiction
- Publisher: Pellegrini & Cudahy for Arkham House
- Publication date: 1952
- Publication place: United States
- Media type: Print (hardback)
- Pages: vii, 322

Tales from Underwood is a collection of fantasy, horror and science fiction short stories by American writer David H. Keller. It was released in 1952 and was the author's first collection published in association with Arkham House. It was also the first of only two books published by Pellegrini & Cudahy for Arkham House. It was released in an edition of 3,500 copies.

Most of the stories had originally appeared in the magazines Weird Tales and Amazing Stories.

== Contents ==
Tales from Underwood contains the following stories:

1. "Introduction"
2. "The Worm"
3. "Revolt of the Pedestrians"
4. "The Yeast Men"
5. "The Ivy War"
6. "The Doorbell"
7. "The Flying Fool"
8. "The Psychoponic Nurse"
9. "A Biological Experiment"
10. "Free as the Air"
11. "The Bridle"
12. "Tiger Cat"
13. "The God Wheel"
14. "The Golden Bough"
15. "The Jelly Fish"
16. "The Opium Eater"
17. "The Thing in the Cellar"
18. "The Moon Artist"
19. "Creation Unforgivable"
20. "The Dead Woman"
21. "The Door"
22. "The Perfumed Garden"
23. "The Literary Corkscrew"
24. "A Piece of Linoleum"

== Sources ==
- Jaffery, Sheldon (1989). The Arkham House Companion. Mercer Island, WA: Starmont House, Inc. p. 42. ISBN 1-55742-005-X.
- Chalker, Jack L.; Mark Owings (1998). The Science-Fantasy Publishers: A Bibliographic History, 1923-1998. Westminster, MD and Baltimore: Mirage Press, Ltd. p. 34.
- Joshi, S.T. (1999). Sixty Years of Arkham House: A History and Bibliography. Sauk City, WI: Arkham House. pp. 58–59. ISBN 0-87054-176-5.
- Nielsen, Leon (2004). Arkham House Books: A Collector's Guide. Jefferson, NC and London: McFarland & Company, Inc. p. 74. ISBN 0-7864-1785-4.
