= Nomad (novel) =

1950 novel by George O. Smith

- Dust-jacket from the first edition
- Author: George O. Smith
- Cover artist: L. Robert Tschirky
- Language: English
- Genre: Science fiction
- Publisher: Prime Press
- Publication date: 1950
- Publication place: United States
- OCLC: 1295364

Nomad is a science fiction novel by American writer George O. Smith. It was first published in book form in 1950 by Prime Press in an edition of 2,500 copies. The novel was originally serialized in three parts in the magazine Astounding beginning in December 1944, under Smith's pseudonym, Wesley Long.

== Plot introduction ==
The novel concerns Guy Maynard, of Earth, who is rescued from his Martian captors by Thomakein of the planet Ertene, an invisible wandering planet. After spending time on Ertene, Maynard returns to Earth where he uses the knowledge he gained to launch an invasion against the newly discovered planet Mephisto. He returns to Earth a hero, but is later court martialed and driven from the Galactic Patrol. He seeks refuge on Ertene by impersonating their ruler. When he is discovered, he flees to Mephisto and there raises an army enabling him to conquer the Solar System becoming its emperor.

== Reception ==
Willy Ley gave the novel a mixed review, praising it as "a story which keeps moving from page one to the end," but complaining that it included "too much plot and counterplot, sub-plot and sub-sub-plot."

== Sources ==
- Chalker, Jack L.; Mark Owings (1998). The Science-Fantasy Publishers: A Bibliographic History, 1923-1998. Westminster, MD and Baltimore: Mirage Press, Ltd. p. 532.
- Crawford, Jr., Joseph H.; James J. Donahue; Donald M. Grant (1953). "333", A Bibliography of the Science-Fantasy Novel. Providence, RI: The Grandon Company. p. 58. OCLC 3924496.
- Tuck, Donald H. (1978). The Encyclopedia of Science Fiction and Fantasy. Chicago: Advent. p. 400. ISBN 0-911682-22-8.
