= Lords of Creation =

1949 novel by Eando Binder

- Dust-jacket from the first edition
- Author: Eando Binder
- Cover artist: S. Levin
- Language: English
- Genre: Science fiction
- Publisher: Prime Press
- Publication date: 1949
- Publication place: United States
- Media type: Print (hardback)
- Pages: 232
- OCLC: 2562158

Lords of Creation is a science fiction novel by American author Eando Binder (combined pseudonym for American brothers Earl and Otto Binder). It was first published in book form in 1949 by Prime Press in an edition of 2,112 copies, of which 112 were signed, numbered and slipcased. The novel was originally serialized in six parts in the magazine Argosy beginning September 23, 1939.

== Plot summary ==
Homer Ellory awakes in the year 5000 AD after sleeping for 3,000 years and discovers the Earth in a state of barbarism. He befriends the people of North America who have been conquered by the Antarkans. Ellory leads a revolt, but is captured by the Antarkans, imprisoned in the Antarkan city of Lillamra and sentenced to death. The Lady Ermaine falls in love with him and enables his escape. He returns to North America, where he leads a second revolt. After the surrender of Antarka, he is proclaimed the leader of the Earth's peoples.

== Sources ==
- Lords of Creation title listing at the Internet Speculative Fiction Database
- Chalker, Jack L.; Mark Owings (1998). The Science-Fantasy Publishers: A Bibliographic History, 1923-1998. Westminster, MD and Baltimore: Mirage Press, Ltd. p. 531.
- Crawford, Jr., Joseph H.; James J. Donahue; Donald M. Grant (1953). "333", A Bibliography of the Science-Fantasy Novel. Providence, RI: The Grandon Company. p. 12. OCLC 3924496.
- Tuck, Donald H. (1974). The Encyclopedia of Science Fiction and Fantasy. Chicago: Advent. p. 46. ISBN 0-911682-20-1.
