= Alexander M. Phillips =

American novelist

- Born: 1907; Philadelphia, Pennsylvania, United States
- Died: 1991 (aged 83–84)
- Occupations: Novelist, short story writer
- Writing career
- Genres: Science fiction, Fantasy

Alexander Moore Phillips (1907–1991) was an American short story writer and novelist. He also worked as a topographical draftsman for a title insurance company. Phillips served in the U. S. Army from April, 1942 spending time in Egypt and Palestine. His short stories appeared in pulp magazines including Amazing Stories, Wonder Stories and Unknown. His novel, The Mislaid Charm, was published by Prime Press in 1947. He served as president of the Philadelphia Science Fiction Society.
