= Sexual Education of the Young Woman =

1923 book by David H. Keller

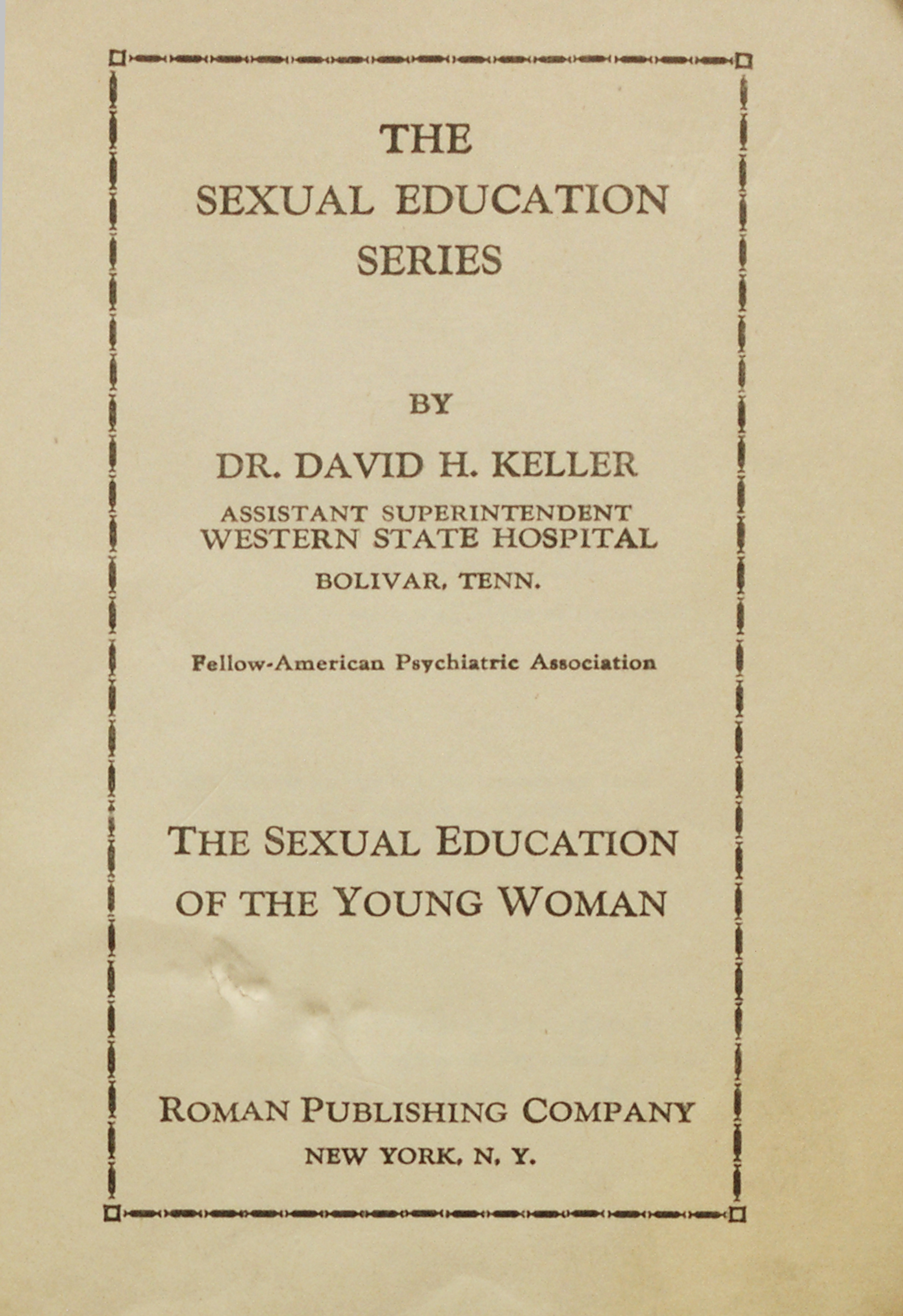
- Title page of book
- Author: David H. Keller
- Original title: Sexual Education of the Young Women
- Language: English
- Genre: Educational
- Publisher: Roman Publishing Company, New York
- Publication date: 1923
- Publication place: USA
- Media type: Print
- Pages: 154 (first edition)

Sexual Education of the Young Woman is an educational book, published in 1923 and written by a psychiatrist and author David H. Keller (1880- 1966). The book provides sexual education guidelines for the girls above the age of six years old. The guidelines concern biological knowledge about the female and male bodies, discussed in the context of prevailing moral and social norms. The book is intended to be read by the young girl herself or conveyed by her parents. As such, it is not only a source of knowledge but also a parenting tool. Sexual Education of the Young Woman contains 13 chapters, each dealing with a different topic of sexual education. It has clear views on the issues of morality and social norms- women are depicted as fundamentally different from men. The author suggests that the life purpose of a woman is giving birth and raising children as well as assuring a cozy and relaxing life for her husband. However, Dr. Keller stresses the importance of proper general and sexual education, and the influence it has on the happiness of a future mother and wife. Sexual Education of the Young Woman is a part of a 10 volume collection The Sexual Education Series released in 1928.

== Contents ==
The chapters include:

- Introduction: explains the nature of a female as deeply rooted in the role of a mother and the relevance of proper sexual education in becoming a successful care giver. The strong relationship between mother and daughter is described, suggesting that mothers should not omit the topic of sexuality if they themselves do not have sufficient knowledge. Instead, mothers should seek and provide relevant literature, this way preventing misconceptions about sexuality.
- A history of the young girl: the chapter tells about the rise of the female sex and its position in society through ages. The book also discusses mystical accounts about female influence on males, and the origins of the concept of love.
- The girl's obligation to society: the author suggest several fundamental obligations that a girl has to society. Among them are the acts of helping the mother, respecting and serving the father and becoming a good mother.
- The anatomy of the young girl: describes and illustrates the anatomy of a female in clear and easily comprehensible terms.
- The physiology of the young girl: physiology of a girl is explained in terms of the bodily changes she goes through in her life.
- The psychology of the young girl: mental life of a girl is discussed. The author talks about self-consciousness and shyness, the religious enthusiasm and other ways a girl copes with the difficulties when turning into a woman.
- The hygiene of the young girl: the author talks about the cleanliness, sleep, exercising, continence, and the role they play in a healthy girl's life.
- The question of prostitution: the author talks about the issues of prostitution that every girl should be aware of. He describes the trap like nature of the decision to become a prostitute and the difficulties in trying to escape this life pattern.
- The cost of the immorality: it is suggested that sex before or outside the marriage will result in sexually transmitted diseases. Additionally, prostitution is regarded as harmful to society as a whole, pointing to the many-sided problems that arise from moral misconduct.
- The bachelor girl: the decision to remain unmarried is discussed. Social influences and problematic home relationships are offered as explanations for it.
- The working girl: the working girl deals with many asperities on the daily basis. Author stresses the importance of government provided education that would give girls a chance for a better life.
- What a young girl should know about men: the chapter explains physiology and anatomy of men reproductive system.
- The girl beautiful: this chapter is a closing remark on the development of young woman and the importance of a loving and carrying home environment.

== Sex education in the early 20th century ==
The book was written during the time now called the Progressive Era, that marked the period between the 1880s and late 1920s. The progressive era was a response to the Second Industrial Revolution and the social problems that arose with it. Among other things, the progressive era saw changes in the way sex and morality were regarded. In the early 1900s the Victorian values were still prominent, regarding sex outside the marriage as immoral and sexual education as leading to moral misconduct. However, the flux of immigrants following the industrial revolution led to increased rates of prostitution. Additionally, instances of children and adolescence labor were on the rise, allowing the youth to gain information outside their homes, threatening the reliability and morality of the sex-related information. These social problems called for changes in sexual education, hence, in 1912 and 1914 the National Education Association proposed the adoption of sex education in schools The topics in the book reflect the post-industrial revolution problems. The author dedicated individual chapters to discuss prostitution and the health dangers it poses to the prostitutes and the society. Additionally, chapter "the working girl" deals with an issue of children labor and the lack of accessible education. The author also acknowledges that every young girl should be provided with sexual education, mirroring the concerns of the National Education Association. However, the sexuality of women was still conceived in the Victorian terms, as witnessed in the writings of Guernsey, where woman's sexuality was still regarded as sinful and immoral. Similarly, Dr. David H. Keller names the virginity and prudence as the most valuable merits of a young woman. The idea that women sexuality is natural and normal finally became widespread with the rise of Sexual Revolution (1960-1980).

A young girl must realize that only by being a healthy woman can she be a happy wife and a normal mother of healthy children. She can accomplish this end by being clean herself during the years prior to her marriage

== Reception ==
David H. Keller was best known for his horror and science fiction writings. In turn, the non- fictional publications, such as Sexual Education of the Young Woman, did not receive prominent reviews. However, his work in fiction has obtained mixed opinions; some critics claimed that David H. Keller added to the development of science fiction genre, while others criticized him for a rather mediocre writing.
