= The Lady Decides =

1950 novel by David H. Keller

- First limited edition
- Author: David H. Keller, M.D.
- Language: English
- Genre: Fantasy novel
- Publisher: Prime Press
- Publication date: 1950
- Publication place: United States
- Media type: Print (Hardback)
- Pages: 139 pp
- OCLC: 6293723

The Lady Decides is a fantasy novel by author David H. Keller, M.D. It was first published in 1950 by Prime Press in an edition of 400 copies, all of which were signed, numbered and slipcased.

== Plot introduction ==
The novel concerns a man with a dream and an allegorical quest through Spain.
