= ... And Some Were Human =

1948 collection of short stories by Lester del Rey

- First edition
- Author: Lester del Rey
- Illustrator: S. Levin
- Cover artist: L. Robert Tschirky
- Language: English
- Genre: Science fiction and fantasy short stories
- Publisher: Prime Press
- Publication date: 1948
- Publication place: United States
- Media type: Print (hardback & paperback)
- Pages: 331 pp
- OCLC: 1962580

"...and some were human." is the first story collection by science fiction writer Lester del Rey, originally published in hardcover by Prime Press in 1948 in an edition of 3,050 copies of which 50 were specially bound, slipcased and signed by the author. The stories first appeared in Astounding and Unknown. An abridged paperback edition, including only eight of the twelve stories, was issued by Ballantine Books in 1961. A Spanish translation, reportedly dropping only one story, appeared in 1957.

== Contents ==
- "Foreword"
- "Hereafter, Inc." (Unknown 1941)
- "The Day Is Done" (Astounding 1939)
- "Forsaking All Others" (Unknown 1939)
- "The Coppersmith"* (Unknown 1939)
- "The Luck of Ignatz" ( Astounding 1939)
- "The Faithful"* (Astounding 1938)
- "Dark Mission" (Astounding Jul 1940)
- "Helen O'Loy" (Astounding 1938)
- "The Stars Look Down"* (Astounding 1940)
- "The Renegade" (Astounding 1943)
- "The Wings of Night" (Astounding 1942)
- "Nerves"* (Astounding Sep 1942)

Stories marked with an asterisk* were omitted from the Ballantine paperback. "Helen O'Loy" was reportedly omitted from the Spanish translation.

== Reception ==
Sam Moskowitz wrote that del Rey "displays enough understanding of the basic emotions of mankind to stand clearly apart from the herd in providing heart-warming entertainment". P. Schuyler Miller similarly noted that del Rey's characters "have a warmth about them which makes what happens to them the reader's serious concern . . . because they are people you'd like to know.", he also noted that the stories had been popular with readers when originally published, and "five to ten years later, they hold up equally well". Amazing Stories reviewer Morris Tish also reviewed the collection favorably, calling the selections "some of the best examples of [del Rey's] work. Alfred Bester, however, took a contrary view; reviewing the 1961 edition, he declared Del Rey's work "lacking in any comprehension of human or parahuman motives and behaviour. . . . [M]ood-writing demands a poetic insight and discipline beyond his ability; he is merely sentimental." E. F. Bleiler commented that the stories "were unusual in their day for using a sentimental approach that was sometimes very effective".

== Publication history ==
- 1948, USA, Prime Press OCLC 1962580, Pub date 1948, Hardback
- 1957, Spain, Nebula, Pub date 1957, Paperback, as y algunos eran humanos, omits "Helen O'Loy"
- 1961, USA, Ballantine Books OCLC 1635423, Pub date 1961, Paperback, omits 4 stories
