= Venus Equilateral (collection) =

1947 short story collection by George O. Smith

- Dust-jacket from the first edition
- Author: George O. Smith
- Illustrator: Sol Levin
- Cover artist: George O. Smith
- Language: English
- Series: Venus Equilateral
- Genre: Science fiction
- Publisher: Prime Press
- Publication date: 1947
- Publication place: United States
- Media type: Print (hardback)
- Pages: 455 pp
- OCLC: 1289947

Venus Equilateral is a collection of science fiction short stories by American writer George O. Smith. The stories belong to Smith's Venus Equilateral series. The collection was first published in 1947 by Prime Press in an edition of 3,000 copies. "Mad Holiday" was written for this collection. The other stories first appeared in the magazine Astounding.

== Contents ==
- Introduction, by John W. Campbell, Jr.
- "QRM—Interplanetary"
- "Calling the Empress"
- "Recoil"
- "Off the Beam"
- "The Long Way"
- "Beam Pirate"
- "Firing Line"
- "Special Delivery"
- "Pandora’s Millions"
- "Mad Holiday"
- "The External Triangle"
- "Epilogue: Identity"

== Sources ==
- Chalker, Jack L.; Mark Owings (1998). The Science-Fantasy Publishers: A Bibliographic History, 1923-1998. Westminster, MD and Baltimore: Mirage Press, Ltd. p. 530.
- Tuck, Donald H. (1978). The Encyclopedia of Science Fiction and Fantasy. Chicago: Advent. p. 400. ISBN 0-911682-22-8.
