= Herschel Levit =

American artist, designer, illustrator, author and educator

- Born: May 29, 1912; Philadelphia, Pennsylvania, U.S.
- Died: June 1, 1986 (aged 74)
- Education: Pennsylvania Academy of the Fine Arts
- Employer(s): Pratt Institute (1947–1977), Parsons School of Design (1977–1986)
- Known for: artist, designer, illustrator, author, educator
- Movement: Social realism
- Spouse: Janice Hackenburg
- Children: 1

Herschel "Harry" Levit (May 29, 1912 – June 1, 1986) was an American social realist artist, designer, illustrator, author, and educator. In the 1930s and 1940s, he was active in the Federal Art Project sponsored by the Works Progress Administration (WPA). He was a Professor emeritus at Pratt Institute, teaching from 1947 to 1977 and teaching at Parsons School of Design, from 1977 to 1986.

== Biography ==
Herschel Levit was born in Philadelphia, Pennsylvania on May 29, 1912, to parents Annie and Isadore Levit. His father Isadore had immigrated from Russia. In 1922, his family moved to the town of Shenandoah, Pennsylvania. He studied at the Pennsylvania Academy of the Fine Arts (from 1934 to 1936). In 1939, he was married to Janice (née Hackenburg), and they had a daughter.

During the 1930s and 1940s, he worked in lithography and as a muralist for the Federal Art Project sponsored by the Works Progress Administration (WPA) in Philadelphia.

Levit taught abstract design and advertising design courses at Pratt Institute, from 1947 until 1977. After his retirement from Pratt he started teaching photography courses at Parsons School of Design from 1977 until 1986. Levit's students included Steve Frankfurt, Bob Giraldi, George Lois, Sheila Metzner, Steve Horn, Stan Richards, and Len Sirowitz.

Levit's work is included in many public museum collections including the National Gallery of Art, the Whitney Museum of American Art, the Metropolitan Museum of Art, Pennsylvania Academy of the Fine Arts, and others. His work was included in the exhibition, Modern Art in Your Life (1949) at the Museum of Modern Art in New York City, New York.

== Murals ==
Crispus Attucks (1943) mural by Herschel Levit, in Washington, D.C.

- William Penn's treaty (1940) mural at William Rowen School, Philadelphia, Pennsylvania
- General Washington's Troops on Old York Road (1942) tempera mural at the post office, Jenkintown, Pennsylvania, (moved to a new location).
- Crispus Attucks (1943), mural at the Recorder of Deeds building, 515 D St., NW, Washington, D.C.
- Farn and Mill (1941), mural at the post office in Louisville, Ohio, (moved to a new location).

== Publications ==
=== As illustrator ===
- Phillips, Alexander M. (1947). The Mislaid Charm. Herschel Levit (Illustrator). Philadelphia, Pennsylvania: The Prime Press. OCLC 1132507.
- Mann, John Harvey (1966). Louis Pasteur, The Germ Killer. Herschel Levit (Illustrator). New York City, New York: Macmillan Publishing Company. OCLC 2455517.
- Schiller, Barbara (1971). The Wandering Knight. Herschel Levit (Illustrator). Dutton Books. ISBN 9780525422006.

=== As author ===
- Levit, Herschel; Guggenheim, Edith Harris (1972). Grosset's just point! a picture dictionary for travellers. Grosset & Dunlap. ISBN 9780448006543.
- Levit, Herschel; Piranesi, Giovanni Battista (1976). Views of Rome, Then and Now. Dover Publications. ISBN 9780486233390. OCLC 995349438.
