= Path of Unreason =

1958 novel by George O. Smith

- Dust-jacket from the first edition.
- Author: George O. Smith
- Cover artist: W.I. van der Poel
- Language: English
- Genre: Science fiction
- Publisher: Gnome Press
- Publication date: 1958
- Publication place: United States
- Media type: Print (Hardback)
- Pages: 171
- OCLC: 10795113

Path of Unreason is a science fiction novel by American writer George O. Smith. It was published in 1958 by Gnome Press in an edition of 5,000 copies, of which only 3,000 were bound. The novel is an expansion of Smith's story "The Kingdom of the Blind" which first appeared in the magazine Startling Stories in 1947.

== Plot introduction ==
The novel concerns a physicist named Jim Carroll, who is trying to explain the mysterious "Lawson Radiation" while his researches drive him insane.

== Reception ==
Galaxy reviewer Floyd C. Gale gave Path a negative review, rating the novel with two stars out of five and writing that "it is a story that Smith evidently had a lot of fun writing but that the reader will find more difficult to enjoy."

== Sources ==
- Chalker, Jack L.; Mark Owings (1998). The Science-Fantasy Publishers: A Bibliographic History, 1923-1998. Westminster, MD and Baltimore: Mirage Press, Ltd. p. 306.
- Tuck, Donald H. (1978). The Encyclopedia of Science Fiction and Fantasy. Chicago: Advent. p. 400. ISBN 0-911682-22-8.
