= The Folsom Flint and Other Curious Tales =

Collection of stories by American writer David H. Keller

- Dust-jacket by Ronald Clyne.
- Author: David H. Keller
- Cover artist: Ronald Clyne
- Language: English
- Genre: Fantasy, horror, science fiction
- Publisher: Arkham House
- Publication date: 1969
- Publication place: United States
- Media type: Print (hardback)
- Pages: 256

The Folsom Flint and Other Curious Tales is a collection of stories by American writer David H. Keller. It was released in 1969 by Arkham House in an edition of 2,031 copies. It was the author's second book to be published by Arkham House.

== Contents ==
The Folsom Flint and Other Curious Tales contains the following:

1. "In Memoriam: David H. Keller", by Paul Spencer
2. "Unto Us a Child is Born"
3. "The Golden Key"
4. "The Question"
5. "The Red Death"
6. "The White City"
7. "The Pent House"
8. "Air Lines"
9. "Chasm of Monsters"
10. "Dust in the House"
11. "The Landslide"
12. "The Folsom Flint"
13. "The Twins"
14. "Sarah"
15. "Fingers in the Sky"
16. "The Thing in the Cellar"
17. "A Piece of Linoleum"
18. "The Dead Woman"

== Sources ==
- Jaffery, Sheldon (1989). The Arkham House Companion. Mercer Island, WA: Starmont House, Inc. pp. 92–93. ISBN 1-55742-005-X.
- Chalker, Jack L.; Mark Owings (1998). The Science-Fantasy Publishers: A Bibliographic History, 1923-1998. Westminster, MD and Baltimore: Mirage Press, Ltd. p. 45.
- Joshi, S.T. (1999). Sixty Years of Arkham House: A History and Bibliography. Sauk City, WI: Arkham House. p. 105. ISBN 0-87054-176-5.
- Nielsen, Leon (2004). Arkham House Books: A Collector's Guide. Jefferson, NC and London: McFarland & Company, Inc. p. 104. ISBN 0-7864-1785-4.
