= Exiles of Time =

1949 novel by Nelson S. Bond

- Dust-jacket from the first edition
- Author: Nelson S. Bond
- Cover artist: James Gibson
- Language: English
- Genre: Science fiction
- Publisher: Prime Press
- Publication date: 1949
- Publication place: United States
- Pages: 183
- OCLC: 2629453

Exiles of Time is a science fiction novel by American writer Nelson S. Bond. It was first published in book form in 1949 by Prime Press in an edition of 2,112 copies, of which 112 were signed, numbered and slipcased. The novel first appeared in the magazine Blue Book in May 1940.

== Plot introduction ==
After a strange bloodstone amulet is found in an ancient Arabian tomb by archaeologists, the native employees of the expedition attack the others when they refuse to leave. One of the archaeologists, Lance Vidor, seeks refuge in the tomb, where he is transported to a different point in the time circle of Earth. Vidor finds others who have been summoned to the time period for the purpose of saving the Earth from an oncoming comet.

== Reception ==
P. Schuyler Miller, calling Bond a "born storyteller," declared the novel "may be corn to the elect, but it will probably be more like corn squeezins to the neophytes." Fanzine reviewer Thomas A. Carter found Exiles to be "an absorbing adventure fantasy."

== Sources ==
- Chalker, Jack L.; Mark Owings (1998). The Science-Fantasy Publishers: A Bibliographic History, 1923–1998. Westminster, MD and Baltimore: Mirage Press, Ltd. p. 531.
- Crawford, Jr., Joseph H.; James J. Donahue; Donald M. Grant (1953). "333", A Bibliography of the Science-Fantasy Novel. Providence, RI: The Grandon Company. p. 13. OCLC 3924496.
- Tuck, Donald H. (1974). The Encyclopedia of Science Fiction and Fantasy. Chicago: Advent. p. 56. ISBN 0-911682-20-1.
