= It! (short story) =

Short story by Theodore Sturgeon

- Short story by Theodore Sturgeon
- Country: United States
- Language: English
- Genre: Horror short story

Publication
- Published in: Unknown
- Media type: Print, magazine
- Publication date: August 1940

"It!" is a horror short story by American writer Theodore Sturgeon, first published in Unknown of August 1940 (volume 3, number 6). The story deals with a muck-monster that emerges from a swamp, and terrorizes a family who lives nearby. The creature has no emotions, and is simply curious about the things that it observes. Its terrifying strength allows it to grab animals and people and tear them apart, to see how they work. Ultimately, the creature is revealed to have formed around a human skeleton.

P. Schuyler Miller described "It!" as "probably the most unforgettable story ever published in Unknown". The story was published in book form in Sturgeon's first short story collection, Without Sorcery (1948).

The story inspired many similar characters in comic books, including Swamp Thing and Man-Thing.

== Similar characters ==
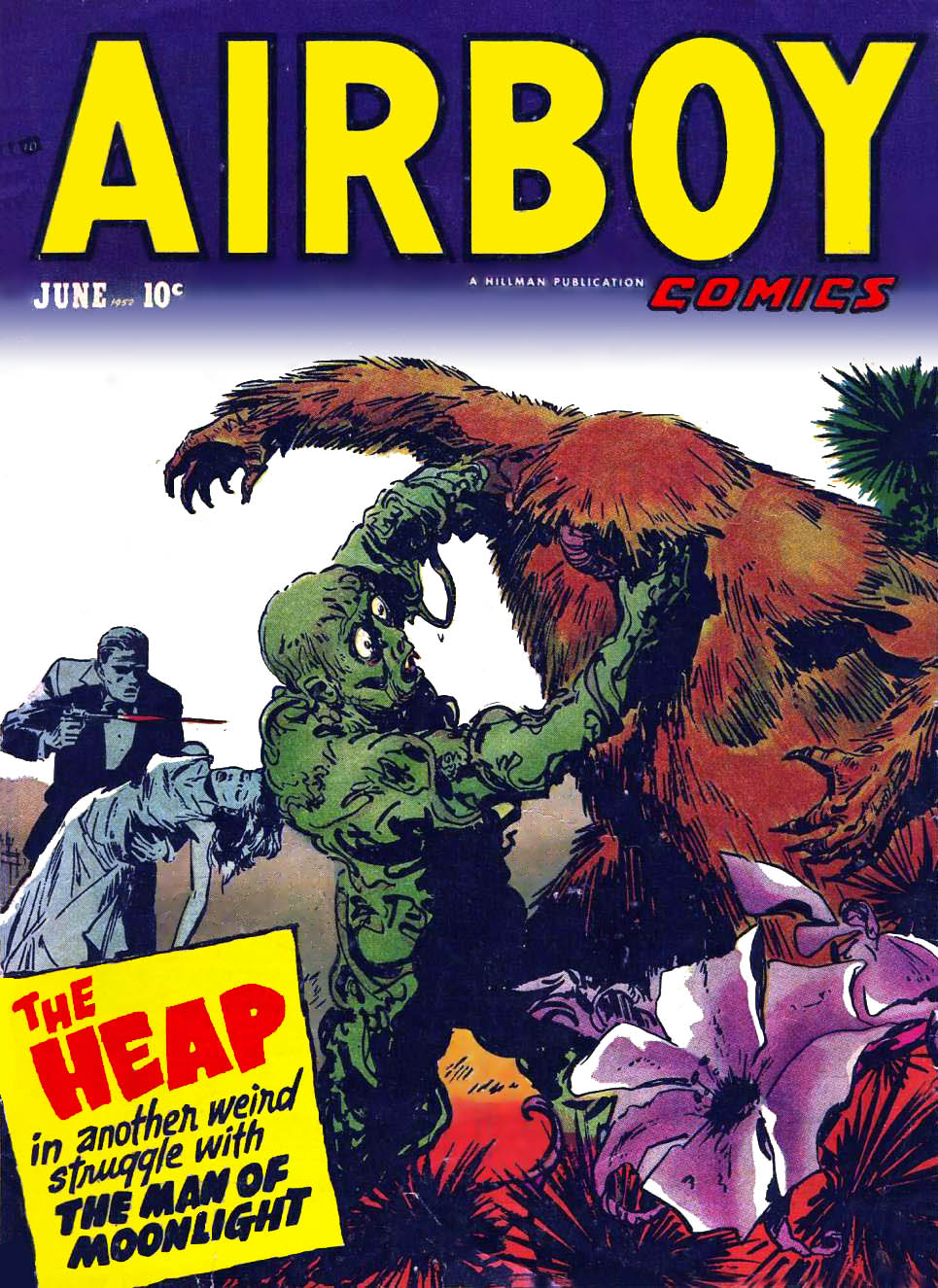
The Heap battles "The Man of the Moonlight" on the cover of Airboy Comics, volume 9, number 5 (March 1952). Artwork by Ernest Schroeder.

Plant-based swamp monsters similar to that in the story appear in various comic books. Among these characters are Hillman Comics' the Heap in Airboy Comics, who debuted in what was intended as a one-time appearance in the feature "Skywolf" in Air Fighters #3 (December 1942).

Early depictions of the Heap look highly similar to the Looney Tunes/Merrie Melodies character Gossamer, an orange-furred, practically featureless monster in sneakers who menaced Bugs Bunny in the 1946 animated short "Hair-Raising Hare" before going on to other appearances (and named "Rudolph" in one).

Solomon Grundy in All-American Comics is the result of a criminal having fallen in a swamp, though he did not have a plant-like appearance.

Sturgeon's story continued to show influence after the relaxation of the Comics Code Authority's restrictions on horror late in 1971. The Man-Thing first appeared (in an unrestricted black and white magazine-size comic) from Marvel Comics in May 1971, and DC Comics introduced the Swamp Thing in the anthology comic House of Secrets #92 in June 1971. A different character, based upon the House of Secrets story and also called the Swamp Thing, debuted in issue #1 of its own title (November 1972).

Marvel also published an adaptation of the original story in Supernatural Thrillers #1. Supernatural Thrillers #1 sold very well; Marvel wanted an "It!" comic book. Roy Thomas and Jenny Blake Isabella discussed this and determined they could not do a continuation of the Sturgeon story since they were already publishing Man-Thing as an ongoing series. Isabella suggested he and Thomas look at the sales of their monster reprint titles and discovered that the two issues that reprinted the Colossus stories by Larry Lieber and Jack Kirby had sold better than other issues of those titles. Isabella started developing what became It! The Living Colossus.

The 1980s saw the introduction of Bog Swamp Demon and two Swamp Thing movies, as well as Dave Sim's Man-Thing and Swamp Thing parodies, Woman-Thing and Sump-Thing, in the pages of Cerebus.

The 1990s introduced more parodies, including Swamp Beast in Harvey Comics' Monster in My Pocket and Man-Thang and Swamp-Thang in Marvel's What The--?!.
