= The Mislaid Charm =

1947 novel by Alexander M. Phillips

- Dust-jacket from the first edition
- Author: Alexander M. Phillips
- Illustrator: Herschel Levit
- Cover artist: Herschel Levit
- Language: English
- Genre: Fantasy novel
- Publisher: Prime Press
- Publication date: 1947
- Publication place: United States
- Media type: Print (Hardback)
- Pages: 91 pp
- OCLC: 1132507

The Mislaid Charm is a fantasy novel by author Alexander M. Phillips. It was first published in book form in 1947 by Prime Press in an edition of 5,000 copies. The novel originally appeared in the magazine Unknown in February 1941. It is the first novel published by Prime Press.

== Plot introduction ==
The novel concerns Henry Pickett, a traveling salesman, and his adventures after he acquires a magical tribal charm belonging to some gnomes.

== Reception ==
L. Sprague de Camp described the novel as "that comparative rarity, a first-rate humorous fantasy" and "wish[ed] the story had been at least fifty per cent longer."
