= Without Sorcery =

Book by Theodore Sturgeon

- Dust-jacket from the first edition
- Author: Theodore Sturgeon
- Illustrator: L. Robert Tschirky
- Cover artist: L. Robert Tschirky
- Language: English
- Genre: Science fiction, fantasy
- Publisher: Prime Press
- Publication date: 1948
- Publication place: United States
- Media type: Print (hardback)
- Pages: 355
- OCLC: 5147779

Without Sorcery is a collection of science fiction and fantasy short stories by American writer Theodore Sturgeon. The collection was first published in 1948 by Prime Press in an edition of 2,862 copies of which 80 were specially bound, slipcased and signed by the author and artist. The stories first appeared in the magazines Astounding and Unknown.

== Contents ==
- Introduction, by Ray Bradbury
- "The Ultimate Egoist"
- "It!"
- "Poker Face"
- "Shottle Bop"
- "Artnan Process"
- "Memorial"
- "Ether Breather"
- "Butyl and the Breather"
- "Brat"
- "Two Percent Inspiration"
- "Cargo"
- "Maturity"
- "Microcosmic God"

== "It!" ==
To promote Without Sorcery, Prime Press published the story "It!" in advance of the full collection. The book was published in paperback in an edition of 200 copies (OCLC 19372331). Fifty copies were given away at the Associated Fantasy Publishers party at the 6th World Science Fiction Convention and most were signed by Sturgeon. Few of the remaining copies were sold and the remainder are assumed destroyed.

== Reception ==
Boucher and McComas named Without Sorcery the best SF short fiction collection of 1949, citing the way Sturgeon "combines ingenious concepts with humor, humanity and sheer good writing." Astounding reviewer P. Schuyler Miller praised the collection, saying it included "perhaps the greatest variety of any short-story collection yet brought out by the fantasy publishers."

== Sources ==
- Chalker, Jack L.; Mark Owings (1998). The Science-Fantasy Publishers: A Bibliographic History, 1923–1998. Westminster, MD and Baltimore: Mirage Press, Ltd.
- Contento, William G. "Index to Science Fiction Anthologies and Collections". Archived from the original on 2020-10-27.
- Tuck, Donald H. (1978). The Encyclopedia of Science Fiction and Fantasy. Chicago: Advent. ISBN 0-911682-22-8.
