= George O. Smith =

American writer

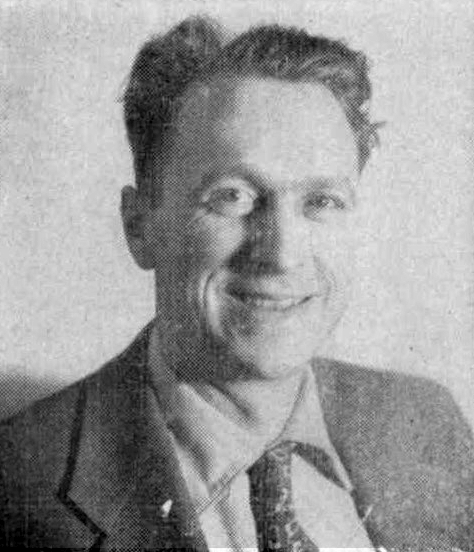
George O Smith c.1955

George Oliver Smith (April 9, 1911 – May 27, 1981) (known also by the pseudonym Wesley Long) was an American science fiction author. He is not to be confused with George H. Smith, another American science fiction author.

== Biography ==
Smith was an active contributor to Astounding Science Fiction during the Golden Age of Science Fiction of the 1940s. His collaboration with the magazine's editor, John W. Campbell, Jr. was interrupted when Campbell's first wife, Doña, left him in 1949 and married Smith.

Smith continued regularly publishing science fiction novels and stories until 1960. His output greatly diminished during the 1960s and 1970s when he had a job that required his undivided attention. He was awarded the First Fandom Hall of Fame award in 1980.

He was a member of the all-male literary banqueting club the Trap Door Spiders, which served as the basis of Isaac Asimov's fictional group of mystery solvers the Black Widowers.

== Writing career ==
Smith wrote mainly about outer space, with such works as Operation Interstellar (1950), Lost in Space (1959), and Troubled Star (1957).

He is remembered chiefly for his Venus Equilateral series of short stories about a communications station in outer space. Most of the stories were collected in Venus Equilateral (1947), which was later expanded with the remaining three stories as The Complete Venus Equilateral (1976).

His novel The Fourth "R" (1959) – re-published as The Brain Machine (1968) – was an examination of a child prodigy, a digression from his concern with outer space.

== Bibliography ==
- Trouble (magazine publication 1946)
- Venus Equilateral (1947) (expanded as The Complete Venus Equilateral in 1976)
- Pattern for Conquest (magazine publication 1946, book publication 1949)
- Nomad (1950)
- Operation Interstellar (1950)
- Dark Recess (magazine publication 1951)
- Hellflower (1953)
- Highways in Hiding (magazine publication 1955, book publication 1956, abridged as Space Plague in 1957)
- Troubled Star (magazine publication 1953, book publication 1957)
- Fire in the Heavens (1958)
- Path of Unreason (1958)
- Instinct (1959)
- The Undetected (1959)
- The Fourth "R" (1959, reprinted as The Brain Machine in 1968)
- Lost in Space (1959)
- The Troublemakers (1960)
- Amateur in Chancery (1961)
- The Luck of Magnitudes (1962)
- Understanding (1967)
- Worlds of George O. (1982)
