= Louis-Sébastien Mercier =

French dramatist and writer (1740–1814)

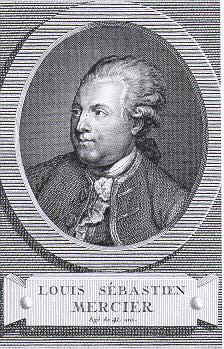
- Born: 6 June 1740; Paris, France
- Died: 25 April 1814 (aged 73); Paris, France
- Occupation: Writer

Louis-Sébastien Mercier (6 June 1740 – 25 April 1814) was a French dramatist and writer, whose 1771 novel L'An 2440 is an example of proto-science fiction.

== Early life and education ==
He was born in Paris to a humble family: his father was a skilled artisan who polished swords and metal arms. Mercier nevertheless received a decent education.

== Literary career ==
Mercier began his literary career by writing heroic epistles. Early on, he came to the conclusion that Boileau and Racine had ruined the French language and that the true poet wrote in prose.

He wrote plays, pamphlets, and novels, and published prodigiously. Mercier often recycled passages from one work to another and expanded on essays he had already written. Mercier's keen observations on his surroundings and the journalistic feel of his writing meant that his work remained riveting despite the nature of its composition. "There is no better writer to consult," Robert Darnton wrote, "if one wants to get some idea of how Paris looked, sounded, smelled, and felt on the eve of the Revolution."

The most important of his miscellaneous works are L'An 2440, rêve s'il en fut jamais (1771), L'Essai sur l'art dramatique (1773), Néologie ou Vocabulaire (1801), Le Tableau de Paris (1781–1788), Le nouveau Paris (1799), Histoire de France (1802) and Satire contre Racine et Boileau (1808).

He decried French tragedy as a caricature of antique and foreign customs in bombastic verse and advocated the drame as understood by Diderot. To the philosophers of his century, he became entirely hostile. He denied that modern science had made any real advances; in a jesting passage, he even carried his conservatism so far as to maintain that the earth was a circular flat plane around which revolved the sun.

Mercier wrote some sixty dramas, among which may be mentioned Jean Hennuyer (1772), La Destruction de la ligue (1782), Jennval (1769), Le Juge (1774), Natalie (1775) and La Brouette du vinaigrier (1775).

=== L'An 2440 (The Year 2440) ===
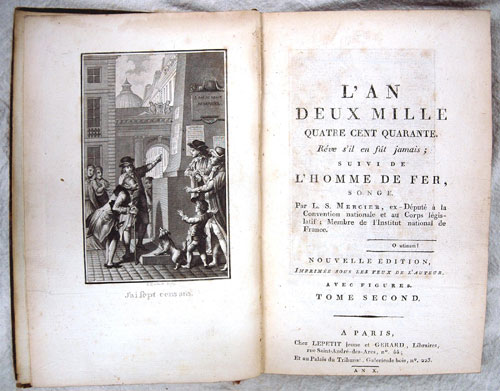
Louis-Sebastien Mercier, L'An deux mille quatre cent quarante (The Year 2440), vol. II, Paris, Lepetit Jeune et Gerard, 1802

Mercier's L'An 2440, rêve s'il en fut jamais (literally, "The Year 2440: A Dream If Ever There Was One"; translated into English as Memoirs of the Year Two Thousand Five Hundred [sic]; and into German as Das Jahr zwey tausend vier hundert und vierzig: Ein Traum aller Träume) is a utopian novel set in the year 2440. This extremely popular work (it went through twenty-five editions after its first appearance in 1771) describes the adventures of an unnamed man, who, after engaging in a heated discussion with a philosopher friend about the injustices of Paris, falls asleep and finds himself in a Paris of the future. Darnton writes that "despite its self-proclaimed character of fantasy...L'An 2440 demanded to be read as a serious guidebook to the future. It offered an astonishing new perspective: the future as a fait accompli and the present as a distant past. Who could resist the temptation to participate in such a thought experiment? And once engaged in it, who could fail to see that it exposed the rottenness of the society before his eyes, the Paris of the eighteenth century?"

== Political and religious views ==
In politics he was a moderate, and, as a member of the National Convention, he voted against the death penalty for Louis XVI. During the Reign of Terror, he was imprisoned, but he was released after the fall of Maximilien Robespierre, whom he termed a "Sanguinocrat" (roughly, ruler by bloodshed).

Mercier was a Freemason and member of the Lodge of Nine Sisters; a board (or, as it is known in French, a planche)—an official document laying out Mercier's perspective as a member of this Masonic lodge, states the following in French:

I have sometimes said to myself, if of all the stirring books in the world there were only one left, what a language there would be in this book, with all its accessories, as well as it as speech, though it would be mute! I assure you that thanks to this book, the torch of human knowledge may not be extinguished. Well, then! Let's enjoy thought for its own sake, not as a matter of ostentation. Every man carries within him both this book and language, the language designed to resound in future centuries. This unknown man...has what it takes to be heard and respected, to propagate the useful ideas it has pleased the Eternal to bestow upon us. Dare, after that, dare to assign him a rank, an inner rank dictated by your blindness. Man is a book that has not been published before. Let’s lift up our ideas together to a sphere greater than the one inhabited by Vanity. Let’s talk, let's not belittle anyone, let's not judge haughtily. Let us be Masons, my brothers, and not academicians.

== Works ==
- 1760: Hécube à Pyrrhus, héroïde, s.l.
- 1762: Hypermnestre à Lyncée, héroïde, s.l.
- 1762: Canacée à Macarée et Hypermnestre à Lyncée, héroïdes nouvelles par l’auteur d’Hécube, s.l.
- 1762: Philoctète à Péan, son père, héroïde, s.l.
- 1763: Crizéas et Zelmine, poème, s.l.
- 1763: Épître d’Héloïse à Abailard, imitation nouvelle de Pope, London
- 1763: Médée à Jason, après le meurtre de ses enfants, héroïde, suivi d’un morceau tiré de Dante, s.l.
- 1763: Sénèque mourant à Néron, héroïde, s.l.
- 1763: Le Bonheur des gens de lettres, discours, Bordeaux
- 1764: Discours sur la lecture, Paris
- 1764: Saint-Preux à Wolmar après la mort de Julie, ou dernière lettre du roman de la Nouvelle Héloïse, Paris
- 1764: La Boucle de cheveux enlevée, poème héroï-comique de Pope, trad., Amsterdam
- 1764: Héroïdes et autres pièces de poésie, Paris
- 1765: Calas sur l’échafaud à ses juges, poème, s.l.
- 1765: Éloge de René Descartes, Genève et Paris, Chez la Vve Pierres
- 1766: Voyage de Robertson, aux terres australes Translation
- 1766: Le Génie, poème, London and Paris
- 1766: Discours sur les malheurs de la guerre et les avantages de la paix, The Hague
- 1766: Histoire d’Izerben, poète arabe, trad. de l’arabe, Amsterdam and Paris, Cellot
- 1767: Éloge de Charles V, roi de France surnommé Le sage, Amsterdam
- 1767: Les Amours de Chérale, poème en six chants, suivi du bon génie, Amsterdam
- 1767: Lettre de Dulis à son ami, London and Paris, Vve Duchesne
- 1767: L’Homme sauvage, histoire trad. de Pfeil, Amsterdam
- 1767: La Sympathie, histoire morale, Amsterdam
- 1767: Virginie, tragédie en cinq actes, Paris, Vve Duchesne
- 1768: Que notre Âme peut se suffire à elle-même, épître philosophique qui a concouru pour le prix de l’Académie française, in 1768, London
- 1768: Contes moraux, ou les Hommes comme il y en a peu, Paris, Panckoucke
- 1768: Songes philosophiques, London and Paris, Lejay
- 1768: Zambeddin, histoire orientale, Amsterdam and Paris, Delalain
- 1768: Fragments d’un éloge de Henri IV, roi de France, Paris
- 1769: Les Cerises, conte en vers, Paris, Lejay
- 1769: Jenneval ou le Barnevelt français, five-act drama in prose, Paris
- 1770: Le Déserteur, drame en cinq actes et en prose, Paris, Lejay
- 1770: Songes d’un ermite, à l’Hermitage de Saint-Amour, Paris, Hardy
- 1770: Olinde et Sophronie, drame héroïque en cinq actes et en prose, Paris, Lejay
- 1771: L'An 2440, rêve s'il en fut jamais, Amsterdam, Van-Harrevelt
- 1772: Le Faux Ami, drame en trois actes en prose, Paris, Lejay
- 1772: L’Indigent, drame en quatre actes en prose, Paris, Lejay
- 1772: Jean Hennuyer, évêque de Lisieux, three-act drama, London
- 1773: Du théâtre ou Nouvel essai sur l’art dramatique, Amsterdam, E. van Harrevelt
- 1774: Childéric, premier roi de France, drame héroïque en trois actes, en prose, London and Paris, Ruault
- 1774: Le Juge, drame en trois actes, in prose, London and Paris, Ruault
- 1775: La Brouette du vinaigrier, three-act drama, London and Paris
- 1775: Nathalie, drame en quatre actes, London and Paris, Ruault
- 1775: Premier mémoire par le Sieur Mercier contre la troupe des Comédiens français, Paris, Vve Herissant
- 1775: Mémoire à consulter et consultation par le Sieur Mercier contre la troupe des comédiens ordinaires du Roi, Paris, Clousier
- 1776: Molière, five-act drama in prose, imitated from de Goldoni, Amsterdam and Paris
- 1776: Éloges et discours académiques qui ont concouru pour les prix de l’Académie française et de plusieurs autres académies, par l’auteur de l’ouvrage intitulé l’an deux mille quatre cent quarante, Amsterdam
- 1776: Jezzenemours, roman dramatique, Amsterdam
- 1776: Les Hommes comme il y en a peu et les Génies comme il n’y en a point, contes moraux orientaux, persans, arabes, turcs, anglais, français, etc., les uns pour rire, les autres à dormir debout, Nouv. éd. Bouillon, impr. de la Soc. Typographique, Neuchâtel
- 1776: Éloges et discours philosophiques, Paris
- 1777: Les Comédiens, ou le Foyer, comédie en un acte et en prose, Paris, Successeurs de la Vve Duchesne
- 1778: Jezennemours, roman dramatique Tome premier; Tome second
- 1778: De la Littérature et des littérateurs suivi d’un Nouvel examen de la tragédie française, Yverdon
- 1778-1784: Theatre complet de M. Mercier. Tome premier; Tome second; Tome troisieme; Tome quatrieme, Amsterdam
- 1778: Le déserteur, drame en cinq actes en prose
- 1778: La Vertu chancelante, ou la Vie de Mlle d’Amincourt, Liège and Paris
- 1779: Le Campagnard, ou le Riche désabusé, drame en deux actes et en prose, The Hague
- 1780: Le Charlatan, ou le docteur Sacroton, comédie-parade en un acte, en prose, The Hague and Paris, Vve Ballard et fils
- 1780: La Demande imprévue, three-act comedy, Paris, Vve Ballard et Vve Duchesne
- 1781: Tableau de Paris. Tome premier; Tome second, Hambourg et Neuchâtel, S. Fauche
- 1781: L’Homme de ma connaissance, two-act comedy in prose, Amsterdam and Paris, Vve Ballard et fils
- 1781: Le Gentillâtre, three-act comedy in prose, Amsterdam and Paris
- 1781: Le Philosophe du Port-au-Bled, s.l.
- 1782: Zoé, drame en trois actes, Neuchâtel, Impr. de la Société typographique
- 1782: Les Tombeaux de Vérone, drame en cinq actes, Neuchâtel, Impr. de la Société typographique
- 1782: La Destruction de la Ligue, ou la réduction de Paris, pièce nationale en quatre actes, Amsterdam and Paris
- 1782: L’Habitant de la Guadeloupe, four-act comedy, Neuchâtel, Impr. de la Société typographique
- 1783: Portraits des rois de France. Tome premier; Tome second; Tome III; Tome quatrieme (1783), Neuchâtel, Impr. de la Société typographique
- 1783: La Mort de Louis XI, roi de France, pièce historique, Neuchâtel
- 1784: Montesquieu à Marseille, Lausanne, J.-P. Heubach et Paris, Poinçot
- 1784: Mon Bonnet de nuit, Neuchâtel, Impr. de la Société typographique
- 1784: Charles II, roi d’Angleterre, en certain lieu, comédie très morale en cinq actes très courts, par un disciple de Pythagore, Venise [i.e. Paris]
- 1784: Les Hospices, s.l.
- 1785: L’Observateur de Paris et du royaume, ou Mémoires historiques et politiques, London
- 1785: Portrait de Philippe II, roi d’Espagne, Amsterdam
- 1785: Histoire d’une jeune Luthérienne, Neuchâtel, Impr. Jérémie Vitel
- 1786: L'An 2440, rêve s'il en fut jamais, 2e éd. suivi de l’Homme de fer, songe, Amsterdam
- 1786: Les Entretiens du Palais-Royal de Paris, Paris, Buisson
- 1787: Notions claires sur les gouvernemens. Tome premier; Tome II, Amsterdam
- 1788: Songes et visions philosophiques, Amsterdam and Paris
- 1788: Tableau de Paris, nouv. éd. corrigée et augmentée, Amsterdam
- 1788: Les Entretiens du jardin des Tuileries de Paris, Paris, Buisson
- 1788: La Maison de Molière, five-act comedy in prose, Paris, Guillot
- 1789: Lettre au Roi, contenant unprojet pour liquider en peu d’années toutes les dettes de l’État soulageant le peuple du fardeau des impositions, Amsterdam et Paris, chez les Marchands de nouveautés
- 1789: Adieux à l’année, s.l.n.d.
- 1790: Le Nouveau Doyen de Killerine, three-act comedy in prose, Paris
- 1790: Réflexions très importantes sur les nouvelles élections des municipalités, s.l.
- 1791: De Jean-Jacques Rousseau considéré comme l’un des premiers auteurs de la Révolution, Paris, Buisson
- 1791: Le ci-devant noble; comédie en trois actes, en prose
- 1791: Adresse de l’agriculture à MM. de l’Assemblée nationale régénératrice de l’Empire français, Paris, C.-F. Perlet
- 1792: Fragments de politique et d’histoire, Paris, Buisson
- 1792: Fictions morales, Paris, Impr. du Cercle social
- 1792: Le Vieillard et ses trois filles, three-act play in prose, Paris, Cercle social
- 1792: Le Ci-Devant noble, three-act comedy, Paris, Impr. du Cercle social
- 1792: Réflexions d’un patriote : Ier sur les assignats; IIe sur les craintes d’une banqueroute nationale; IIIe sur les causes de la baisse des changes étrangers; IVe sur l’organisation de la garde nationale; Ve sur les finances et impositions; VIe sur les assemblées primaires; VIIe sur les droits de patentes avec une Adresse aux Français, Paris, Impr. H.-J. Janse
- 1792: Les Crimes de Philippe II, roi d’Espagne, drame historique, s.l.
- 1793: Isotisme ou le Bon Génie, poème en prose suivi de la Sympathie, histoire morale, Paris
- 1793: Opinion de Louis Sébastien Mercier sur Louis Capet, Paris, Impr. de Restif
- 1793: Philédon et Prothumie, poème érotique suivi de fragments des Amours de Chérale, Paris
- 1794: Timon d’Athènes en cinq actes, en prose, imitation de Shakespeare, Paris, Impr. T. Gérard
- 1794: Fénelon dans son diocèse, pièce dramatique en trois actes et en prose, Paris, marchands de nouveautés
- 1796: Discours de L.-S. Mercier prononcé le 18 floréal sur René Descartes, Paris, Impr. Nationale
- 1796: Rapport fait au nom d’une commission spéciale sur l’enseignement des langues vivantes, Paris, Impr. Nationale
- 1796: Second Rapport fait au nom d’une commission spéciale sur l’enseignement des langues vivantes, Paris, Impr. Nationale
- 1796: Rapport et projet de résolution au nom d’une commission, sur la pétition des peintres, sculpteurs, graveurs, architectes, relativement au droit de patente, Paris, Impr. Nationale
- 1796: Motion d’ordre et discours sur le rétablissement d’une loterie nationale, Paris, Impr. Nationale
- 1796: Opinion de L.-S. Mercier sur les sépultures privées, Paris, Impr. Bertrand-Quinquet
- 1797: Hortense et d'Artamon, comédie en deux actes, et en prose, Paris, Cercle social
- 1797: Le libérateur, comédie en deux actes, et en prose, Paris, Cercle social
- 1797: Opinion de L.-S. Mercier sur le message du Directoire, converti en motion, tendant à astreindre les électeurs au serment décrété pour les fonctionnaires publics, Paris, Impr. Bertrand-Quinquet
- 1798: Mon dictionnaire, s.l.n.d.
- 1798: Mon bonnet de nuit. Tome premiere; Tome seconde (1798)
- 1798: L’An deux mille quatre cent quarante, rêve s’il en fût jamais, suivi de L’homme de fer, songe. Tome premier; Tome second; Tome troisième, Paris, Bresson et Casteret, Dugour et Durand. Nouvelle édition
- 1800: Le Nouveau Paris. Tome premier; Tome second; Tome troisième; Tome quatrième; Tome cinquième; Tome sixième, Brunswick: Chez les principaux librairies
- 1801: Néologie ou vocabulaire de mots nouveaux. Tome premier; Tome second (1801), Paris, Moussard. Nouvelle édition établie, présented and annotated by Jean-Claude Bonnet, Belin, 2009.
- 1802: Histoire de France, depuis Clovis jusqu’au règne de Louis XVI. Tome I; Tome III; Tome IV; Tome V; Tome VI, Paris, chez Cérioux et Lepetit jeune
- 1803: Satyres contre les astronomes, Paris, Terrelonge
- 1804: Charité, Versailles, Ph.-D. Pierres, Paris, Bossange, Masson & Besson
- 1806: De l’impossibilité du système astronomique de Copernic et de Newton, Paris, Dentu
- 1806 L’Apollon pythique, ou des Arts matériellement imitatifs, Paris
- 1808: Satyres contre Racine et Boileau, Paris, Hénée
- 1809: La Maison de Socrate le sage, five-act comedy, prose, Paris, Duminil-Lesueur Read on line

== See also ==
- History of science fiction
- Timeline of science fiction
- Society of the Friends of Truth

== Notes ==
1. Robert Darnton, The Forbidden Best-Sellers of Pre-Revolutionary France (New York: W.W. Norton, 1996), 118.
2. Darnton, Forbidden Best-Sellers, 120.

== Sources ==
- (in French) Bibliotheca Augustana
- Léon Béclard, Sébastien Mercier, sa vie, son œuvre, son temps d'après des documents inédits, Paris: Honoré Champion, 1903, réimp. Hildesheim; New York: G. Olms, 1982.
- Jean-Claude Bonnet, Le Paris de Louis Sébastien Mercier : cartes et index topographique, Paris, Mercure de France, 1994.
- Jean-Claude Bonnet, Louis Sébastien Mercier (1740–1814) : un hérétique en littérature, Paris, Mercure de France, 1995.
- Élisabeth Bourguinat, Les Rues de Paris au XVIIIe siècle : le regard de Louis Sébastien Mercier, Paris, Paris Musées, 1999.
- Paulette L. Castillo, Les Deux Paris de Louis-Sébastien Mercier, Thèse d’honneur de 1977 de Smith College, Northampton.
- Anne-Marie Deval, Sébastien Mercier, précurseur, Thèse de l’Université de Californie à Los Angeles, 1968.
- R. Doumic in the Revue des deux mondes (15 July 1903)
- Louis de Bordes de Fortage, Sébastien Mercier à Bordeaux, Bordeaux, Gounouilhou, 1918.
- Gilles Girard, Inventaire des manuscrits de Louis-Sébastien Mercier conservés à la Bibliothèque de l’Arsenal, Reims, Département de français de l’université, 1974.
- Hermann Hofer, Louis-Sébastien Mercier précurseur et sa fortune : avec des documents inédits : recueil d’études sur l’influence de Mercier, Munich, Fink, 1977.
- Anne Le Fur, Le Paris de Louis Sébastien Mercier : cartes et index toponymique, Paris, Mercure de France, 1994.
- Mario Mormile, La Néologie révolutionnaire de Louis-Sébastien Mercier, Rome, Bulzoni, 1973.
- René Pomeau, L’Imaginaire d’anticipation de Louis-Sébastien Mercier à George Orwell, Paris, Palais de l’Institut, 1998.
- Enrico Rufi, Louis-Sébastien Mercier, Paris, CNRS éditions, 1996.
- Laurent Turcot, Le promeneur à Paris au XVIIIe siècle. Paris, Gallimard, 2007.
- Nedd Willard, La Moralité du théâtre de Louis-Sébastien Mercier, Paris, [s.n.], 1955.
- Nedd Willard, Le Génie et la folie au dix-huitième siècle, Paris, Presses Universitaires de France, 1963.
