= The Fourth "R" =

1959 novel by George O. Smith

- First edition cover
- Author: George O. Smith
- Language: English
- Genre: Science fiction
- Publisher: Ballantine Books
- Publication date: 1959
- Publication place: United States
- Media type: Print (hardback & paperback)
- Pages: 160
- OCLC: 1908857

The Fourth "R" (also known as The Brain Machine) is a science fiction novel by American writer George O. Smith, first published in 1959. It is a science fictional examination of the genius naïf phenomenon. The plot follows a five-year-old boy named Jimmy Holden, who was given the equivalent of a college education by virtue of his parents' invention, an "Electromechanical Educator." The book is not related to the movie The Brain Machine (1977).

== Publication history ==
The book was first published by Ballantine Books in 1959 as The Fourth "R" (#316K), a paperback original. It was reprinted by Lancer Books in 1968 (paperback 74-936) and then by Garland Press in 1975 in hardcover as The Brain Machine. It was reprinted again by Dell under its original title, The Fourth "R", in 1979 (paperback #13419, ISBN 0-440-13419-6)

== Plot summary ==
At the beginning of the story, Jimmy's mother and father are murdered by their best friend, who is also the youngster's godfather and appointed guardian as well as the inventors' trustee. It leaves the protagonist—who has had the plans of his parents' invention eidetically and indelibly imprinted in his mind—to destroy the physical copies of these plans before his "uncle" can finish him off as well.

Jimmy must survive his guardian's efforts to squeeze the secret of the invention out of him (whereupon his death will most certainly be arranged, just as his parents' were), and then escape into hiding until he can grow into a physical stature commensurate with his mental age.

In the process, the character must make for himself a living and a safe place of residence, and Smith uses his protagonist's situation and capabilities to examine the nature of childhood and the "protections" (including incapacitations) imposed upon legal infants in American civil society at the time of writing.

== Reception ==
In his review column for F&SF, Damon Knight selected the novel as one of the 10 best genre books of 1959. R. D. Mullen reported that "Though it becomes tendentious and sentimental in its last chapters, [The Brain Machine] is up to that point a surprisingly good story of the difficulties of the superboy in a world run by stupid adults.
