= The Homunculus =

1949 novel by David H. Keller

- Dust-jacket from the first edition
- Author: David H. Keller, M.D.
- Cover artist: L. Robert Tschirky
- Language: English
- Genre: Fantasy novel
- Publisher: Prime Press
- Publication date: 1949
- Publication place: United States
- Media type: Print (Hardback)
- Pages: 160 pp
- OCLC: 6136512

The Homunculus is a fantasy novel by author David H. Keller, M.D. It was first published in 1949 by Prime Press in an edition of 2,112 copies of which 112 were slipcased and signed by the author.

== Plot introduction ==
The novel concerns Colonel Horatio Bumble who has retired to his ancestral home with his wife, Helen and their Pekingese, Lady. The Bumbles are childless. Colonel Bumble employs the siblings Pete and Sarah at his home. The Colonel is also attempting to create a baby through parthenogenesis. As a result of his experiments, the Colonel is kidnapped and Sarah rescues him by employing supernatural means.
