= David H. Keller =

American writer (1880–1966)

David Henry Keller
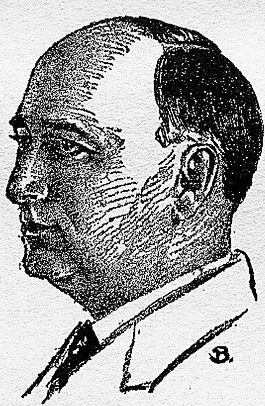
- Keller, as pictured in the July 1929 issue of Science Wonder Stories.
- Born: December 23, 1880; Philadelphia, Pennsylvania
- Died: July 13, 1966 (aged 85)
- Education: University of Pennsylvania School of Medicine
- Occupations: Neuropsychiatrist; Author
- Writing career
- Pen name: Monk Smith, Matthew Smith, Amy Worth, Henry Cecil, Cecilia Henry, and Jacobus Hubelaire
- Genres: Science fiction, horror

David Henry Keller (December 23, 1880 – July 13, 1966) was an American writer who worked for pulp magazines in the mid-twentieth century, in the science fiction, fantasy, and horror genres. He was also a psychiatrist and physician to shell-shocked soldiers during World War I and World War II, and his experience treating mentally ill people is evident in some of his writing, which contains references to mental disorders. He initially wrote short stories as a hobby and published his first science fiction story in Amazing Stories in 1928. He continued to work as a psychiatrist while publishing over sixty short stories in science fiction and horror genres. Technically, his stories were not well-written, but focused on the emotional aspects of imaginative situations, which was unusual for stories at the time.

== Biography ==
Keller was born in Philadelphia on December 23, 1880. He graduated from the School of Medicine at the University of Pennsylvania in 1903. He served as a neuropsychiatrist in the U.S. Army Medical Corps during World Wars I and II and specifically treated shell-shock during World War I. Keller was the Assistant Superintendent of the Louisiana State Mental Hospital at Pineville until Huey Long's reforms removed him from his position in 1928. He specialized in psychoanalysis and also worked in hospitals in Tennessee and Pennsylvania. Keller started out writing recreationally, and had written thirteen novels and fifty short stories before he considered publishing. His wife encouraged him to try profiting from his hobby. Keller's first published work was "Aunt Martha", (1895, Bath Weekly) under the pseudonym Monk Smith.

Keller published his first science fiction story, "The Revolt of the Pedestrians", in February 1928 with Hugo Gernsback in Amazing Stories. Writing during the era of Ford's Model T, Keller may have been the first to consider the long-term effects of mainstream automobiles in the United States. Gernsback was impressed by Keller's quality of writing, unique insight, and ability to address sophisticated themes beyond the commonplace technological predictions or lurid alien encounters typically found in early pulp stories. He encouraged Keller's writing and would later call these distinctive short stories "Keller yarns". Keller remained an active contributor to Amazing Stories through the late 1930s.

In 1929, Gernsback founded the magazine Science Wonder Stories and published Keller's work in the first issue. This began an intense writing period for Keller, but he was unable to support his family solely on a writer's income, so he set up a small private psychiatric practice out of his home in Mount Pocono, Pennsylvania. Gernsback also commissioned Keller to edit his magazine Sexology from 1934 to 1938. Keller published over 60 science fiction and fantasy stories.

Keller became an early scholar of H. P. Lovecraft, publishing occasional works on Lovecraft from 1948 to 1965. Most notably, he was the first to suggest, in 1948, the influential but erroneous idea that Lovecraft could have inherited syphilis from his parents. Lovecraft publisher Arkham House published many books in the fantasy and horror field including a small but steady number throughout the 1950s. Robert Weinberg wrote that a "generous loan" from Keller "prevented Arkham from going bankrupt during a period of cash flow problems". Keller died on July 13, 1966. Robert Weinberg wrote that while Keller was popular as a short story writer in the 1920s and 1930s, his novels did not sell well. Several budding science fiction fan presses, Avalon Publishing Company, New Era Publishers, and NFFF, folded after trying to produce and sell a book by Keller.

== Themes ==
John Clute describes Keller's early work, published by Hugo Gernsback, as containing "heavily foregrounded concepts and Inventions and with their endemic indifference to plausible narrative follow-through". Keller's work often expressed strong right-wing views. Everett F. Bleiler claims he was "an ultra-conservative ideologically". He was especially hostile to feminists and African Americans. Keller's 1928 story "The Menace" revolves about a series of black plots to take over the United States; it has been described by Bleiler as "racially bigotted". Bleiler described the series of stories in "The Menace" as "probably the most offensive to be found in early science-fiction". The last of these, "The Insane Avalanche", is a racist story about removing the black and lower-class white populations of America through violence and deportation. Keller expressed misogynistic views in stories like "Tiger Cat" where an opera singer tortures men into applauding her singing. He used a folklore motif in "The Bridle", where a man uses a magic bridle to turn a witch into a horse until she stops being evil.

Keller was heavily influenced by his personal experiences as a WWI doctor who primarily treated shell-shock. The cultural effects of WWI are evident in Keller's "pessimism" towards humanity, displayed in his works. This "corrosive attitude toward both science and civilization" appeared in his "anti-feminist, racist tendencies" and occasional "sexual sadism". Keller's themes were unique from those of his contemporaries; he emphasized the humanistic and sociological approach to science fiction. Skeptical of relinquishing all control to new technologies, Keller's works examined the human, emotional side to scientific arguments. Examples of this are found in "The Revolt of the Pedestrians" (1928), "Stenographer's Hands" (1928), and "The Threat of the Robot". His horror examined ways abnormal psychology can affect behavior and the body.

== Style ==
Clute conceded that while Keller was not a good writer, his "conceptual inventiveness, and his cultural gloom, are worth more attention than they have received". Keller's writing style reflected author and publisher Hugo Gernsback's wishes for the SF community in Amazing Stories. In a collection of early science fiction, editors Isaac Asimov and Martin Greenberg described Keller as "one of the most conceptually sophisticated" science fiction writers of his time, Bleiler described Keller as "a very poor technician" with "no power of criticism" when it came to writing fiction. However, he also argued that Keller "occasionally wrote fable-like stories, detached from daily realities and surrogate science fiction realities, that were excellent". In his summary of many of Keller's stories, Bleiler often described their writing and execution as poor, describing "Unlocking the Past" as having "the usual bad writing". The St. James Guide to Science Fiction Writers praised his use of the trope where a first-person narrator gradually reveals their insanity while not realizing it themselves.

Keller wrote a number of horror and fantasy stories, which some critics, including Régis Messac, regard as superior to his science fiction work. Highly influenced by his psychiatric background, Keller produced many successful works in horror. Critics claim that there are three main aspects to Keller's writing: uniqueness of style, originality of concept, and influence from Keller's personal experiences. When his writing delves into topics he is less familiar with, the stories become less strong and accurate. The mental disorders in his psychological horrors are often explicitly identified, and his fantasy horrors often symbolize mental disorders. His 1932 horror tale "The Thing in the Cellar" has had 14 reprintings. The story features a boy who is frightened of the cellar, because he knows something is there. To prove that he is incorrect, his family locks him in the kitchen with the open cellar. The boy is found dead the next morning. Keller also created a series of fantasy stories called the Tales of Cornwall sequence, about the Hubelaire family; these were influenced by James Branch Cabell. Keller also wrote some fantasy work inspired by his interest in Freudian psychology, including "The Golden Bough" (1934) and The Eternal Conflict (1939 in French; 1949 English).

== Critical response ==
Several of Keller's stories were popular during his lifetime. Donald Tuck lists "A Piece of Linoleum", "Stenographer's Hands", "The Ivy War", and "Revolt of the Pedestrians" as his most notable stories, after "The Thing in the Cellar". "Stenographer's Hands" imagines a world where a company has bred humans to select for the best stenographers, but failed due to inbreeding. Bleiler noted the interesting premise, but called the ending "limp". In "The Ivy War", an ancient creature that expands like ivy takes over Philadelphia, but is killed by a toxin devised by a scientist. Keller's novel The Human Termites is described as a "novel of interest". Clute writes that the "almost delirious" The Human Termites "soon leaves behind the commonplace supposition of a termite Hive Mind [...] in which both termites and humans are seen to be governed by totalitarian central intelligences". He saw the theme as exploring the "horrors of mass combat in World War One". Bleiler described the story as "rather silly" and "mawkish".

In "Revolt of the Pedestrians", people become attached to their cars and lose the use of their legs. Being a pedestrian is outlawed. A rogue group of pedestrians destroy electricity, causing the deaths of many automobilists. Clute writes that it was unusual for a science fiction story to "treat the hypertrophy of automobile culture in the twentieth century as Dystopian". Bleiler described the story as "powerful", "horrible at times, but imaginative and rigorous in logic", and one of the few Keller stories that is worth reading.

== Bibliography ==
Unless otherwise noted, the following information comes from the Internet Speculative Fiction Database. This list is incomplete. Keller wrote many of his stories years before publishing them. He was also known by the pseudonyms Monk Smith, Matthew Smith, Amy Worth, Henry Cecil, Cecilia Henry, and Jacobus Hubelaire.

=== Novels ===
- The Human Termites (in Science Wonder Stories, September, October and November 1929)
- The Conquerors (in Science Wonder Stories, 29 December 1929 and 30 January 1930)
- The Evening Star (in Science Wonder Stories April, May 1930; Sequel to The Conquerors)
- The Time Projector (with David Lasser; in Wonder Stories, August and September 1931)
- The Metal Doom (in Amazing Stories, May, June, July, 1932; Fantastic, November 1967 and January 1968)
- Life Everlasting (in Amazing Stories, July and August 1934)
- The Devil and the Doctor (Simon & Schuster, 1940)
- The Abyss (in Solitary Hunters and The Abyss. 1948)
- The Homunculus (1949)
- The Lady Decides (1950)

=== Short fiction ===
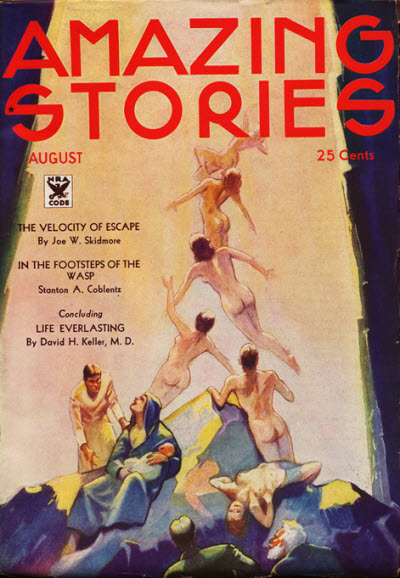
The conclusion of Keller's two-part "Life Everlasting" was cover-featured on the August 1934 issue of Amazing Stories.

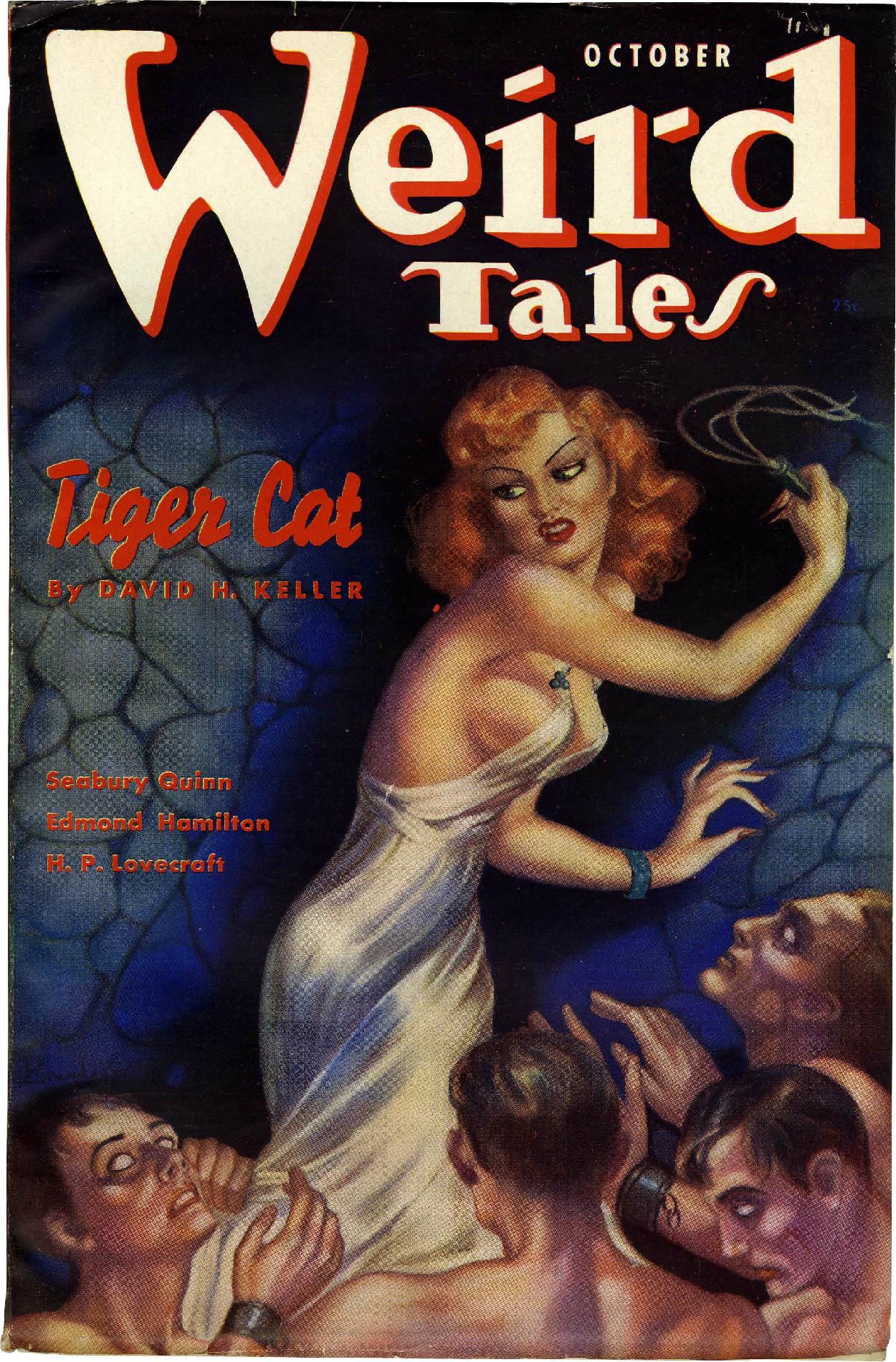
Keller's "Tiger Cat" was the cover story in the October 1937 Weird Tales.

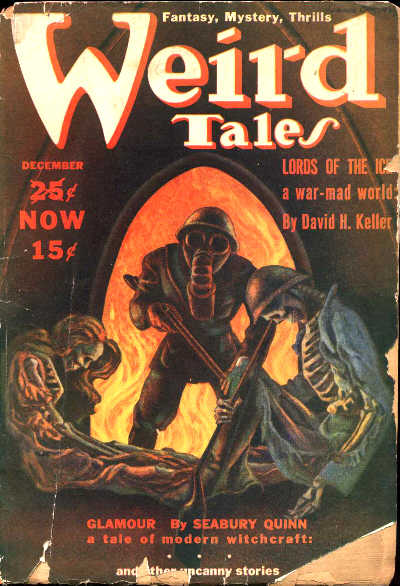
Keller's "Lords of the Ice" was the cover story in the December 1939 Weird Tales, illustrated by Hannes Bok.

- "The Revolt of the Pedestrians" (Amazing Stories, February 1928)
- "The Menace" (Amazing Stories Quarterly Summer 1928)
- "A Biological Experiment" (Amazing Stories, June 1928)
- "The Psychophonic Nurse" (Amazing Stories, November 1928)
- "Stenographer's Hands" (Amazing Stories Quarterly Fall)
- "The Dogs of Salem" (Weird Tales, September 1928)
- "The Yeast Men" (Amazing Stories Quarterly, April 1928)
- "White Collars" (Amazing Stories April)
- "The Jelly Fish" (Weird Tales Jan)
- "The Worm" (Amazing Stories Mar
- "The Damsel and Her Cat" (Weird Tales Apr
- "The Bloodless War" (Air Wonder Stories, July 1929)
- "The Boneless Horror" (Science Wonder Stories, July 1929)
- "The Flying Fool" (Amazing Stories, July 1929)
- "The Feminine Metamorphosis" - (as Amy Worth) Science Wonder Stories, August 1929)
- "The Battle of the Toads" (Weird Tales, October 1929)
- "The Tailed Man of Cornwall" (Weird Tales, November 1929)
- "Dragon's Blood" (Fanews)
- "Air Lines" (Amazing Stories, January 1930)
- "Creation Unforgivable" (Weird Tales, April 1930)
- "The Ivy War" (Amazing Stories, May 1930)
- "Boomeranging 'Round the Moon" (Amazing Stories Quarterly, Fall 1930; reprinted in Science Fiction Classics, Winter 1967, ed. Ralph Adris (Magazine Productions))
- "The Cerebral Library" (Amazing Stories, May 1931)
- "Free as the Air" (Amazing Stories, June 1931)
- "The Rat Racket" (Amazing Stories, November 1931)
- "The Pent House" (Amazing Stories, February 1932)
- "The Thing in the Cellar" (Weird Tales, March 1932)
- "The Hidden Monster" (Oriental Stories, Summer 1932)
- "No More Tomorrows" (Amazing Stories, December 1932)
- "A Piece of Linoleum" - (as Amy Worth; 10 Story Book December 1933)
- "The Lost Language" (Amazing Stories, January 1934)
- "The Dead Woman" (Fantasy Magazine, April 1934)
- "The Literary Corkscrew" (Wonder Stories, March 1034)
- "Binding Deluxe" (Marvel Tales, May 1934)
- "The Doorbell" (Wonder Stories, June 1934)
- "The Golden Bough" (Marvel Tales, Winter 1934)
- "The Living Machine" (Wonder Stories, May 1935)
- "Dust in the House" (Weird Tales, July 1938)
- "The Thirty and One" (Marvel Science Stories, November 1928)
- "The Moon Artist" (Cosmic Tales, Summer 1939)
- "The Goddess of Zion" (Weird Tales, Janunary 1941)
- "The Red Death" (Cosmic Stories July 1941)
- "The Bridle" (Weird Tales, September 1942)
- "Heredity" (The Vortex #2, 1947)
- "The Face in the Mirror" (in Life Everlasting and Other Tales of Science, Fantasy and Horror, The Avalon Company, 1947. Reprinted in: Life Everlasting and Other Tales of Science, Fantasy and Horror (1974), in Hyperion Press's Classics of Science Fiction series, ISBN 0-88355-140-3. Also reprinted in: Keller Memento, 2010, by Ramble House)
- "The Perfumed Garden" (The Gorgon v2 #4, 1948)
- "The Door" (The Arkham Sampler Summer 1949)
- "Chasm of Monsters" (1951; also published in The Folsom Flint and Other Curious Tales, 1969, by Arkham House, and Keller Memento, November, 2010, by Ramble House, ISBN 978-1-60543-528-2))
- "The Folsom Flint" (1952; also published in The Folsom Flint and Other Curious Tales, 1969, by Arkham House, and in Keller Memento, 2010, by Ramble House, ISBN 978-1-60543-528-2))
- "Fingers in the Sky" (1952; also published in The Folsom Flint and Other Curious Tales (1969) by Arkham House, and in Keller Memento, 2010, by Ramble House, ISBN 978-1-60543-528-2
- "The God Wheel" (Tales from Underwood, Arkham House and Pellegrini & Cudahy, 1952))
- "The Opium Eater" (Tales from Underwood, Arkham House and Pellegrini & Cudahy, 1952)
- "The Golden Key" (Destiny, Spring 1953. Also published in The Folsom Flint and Other Curious Tales (1969) by Arkham House, and in Keller Memento (2010) by Ramble House, ISBN 978-1-60543-528-2.)
- "The Question" (Fantastic Worlds, Fall 1953)
- "In Memoriam" (Dark Mind, Dark Heart, ed. August Derleth, Arkham House, 1962)
- "The Landslide" (The Folsom Flint and Other Curious Tales, Arkham House, 1969))

"The House Without Mirrors" (Weird Tales #1, December 1980, ed. Lin Carter, published by Zebra Books/Kensington Publishing Corp.)

=== Early works ===
Works on this list come from the David H. Keller Collection description at the Swarthmore College Library.

- "Aunt Martha" (as Monk Smith; in Bath Weekly, 1895)
- "A Phenomenon of the Stars" (The Mirror February 1897)
- "Judge Not" (in The Red and Blue, University of Pennsylvania, November 1899)
- "The Silent One" (in The Red and Blue, November 1900)
- "A University Story" (as Henry Cecil; in Presbyterian Journal, University of Pennsylvania, December 1901)
- "The Birth of a Soul" (as Henry Cecil; in The White Owl January 1902)
- "A Three Linked Tail" (as Matthew Smith; in The White Owl, March 1902)
- "The Winning Bride" (as Henry Cecil), in The White Owl, March 1902)
- "The Great American Pie House" (as Cecilia Henry; in The White Owl, April 1902)
- "Mother Newhouse" (as Henry Cecil; in The White Owl, May 1902)
- "The Greatness of Duval" (in Ursinus Weekly October 1902)

=== Poetry ===
1924 Songs of a Spanish Lover - privately printed under the name Henry Cecil

=== Nonfiction ===
- The Sexual Education Series (Roman Publishing Company, New York, 1928), It included:
  - Sex and Family Through the Ages
  - The Sexual Education of a Young Man
  - Sexual Education of the Young Woman
  - Love, Courtship, Marriage
  - Companionate Marriage, Birth Control, Divorce, and Modern Home Life
  - Mother and Baby
  - Sexual Diseases and Abnormalities of Adult Life
  - The Sexual Life of Men and Women After Forty
  - Diseases and Problems of Old Age
  - Sex and Society
- "Types of Science Fiction" (in Science Fiction Digest, March 1933, ed. Maurice Z. Ingher)
- "The Psychology of Fear" (in The Thing in the Cellar, 1940, by The Bizarre Series #2)
- "The Med-Lee: News Digest of the 9th Medical Battalion" (12-19-26 November, 10 December 1941)
- "Love Stimulants" (in "Sexology", August 1941)
- "Dr. David H. Keller on His Half a Century of Writing" in The Last Magician: Nine Stories from Weird Tales, April 1978, P.D.A. Enterprises (The David H. Keller Memorial Library #1)
- "What Price Beauty?" (in The Fanscient, #3 Spring 1948, edited by Donald B. Day. The Portland Science Fiction Society)
- "Author, Author: David H. Keller, M.D." (in The Fanscient, #5 Fall 1948, edited Donald B. Day. The Portland Science Fiction Society)
- "Book Reviewing" (in The Fanscient, #7 Spring 1949, edited by Donald B. Day. The Portland Science Fiction Society)
- "Stories and Life" (in The Fanscient, #9 Fall 1949, edited by Donald B. Day. The Portland Science Fiction Society)
- "Longevity" (in Operation Fantast, #5, June 1950, edited by Ken Slater)
- "Shadows over Lovecraft" (in Howard Phillips Lovecraft Memorial Symposium, 1958, Steve Eisner. University of Detroit. Published in Fresco, Spring 1958, v. 8, no. 3, a quarterly magazine published by the University of Detroit)
- "Titus Groan: An Appreciation" (in Exploring Fantasy Worlds: Essays on Fantastic Literature, edited by Darrell Schweitzer. Borgo Press. I.O. Evans Studies in the Philosophy and Criticism of Literature #3. This is the same review that appeared in Operation Fantast, #4, March 1950)

== See also ==
- Homosexuality in speculative fiction
- Sex and sexuality in speculative fiction
