= Mary Griffith (writer) =

American writer, horticulturist and scientist

- Born: Mary Corre; 1772
- Died: 1846 (aged 73–74); Red Hook, New York
- Occupation: Writer
- Writing career
- Genre: Utopian fiction
- Subjects: Agriculture, social reform

Mary Griffith (1772–1846) was an American writer, horticulturist and scientist. She published the results of her research in scientific and literary journals, as well as newspapers. She also published several novels and stories, including Camperdown, or News from Our Neighborhood (1836), as well as Three Hundred Years Hence, the first known utopian novel by an American woman.

== Biography ==
Mary Corre was born in 1772. Her father was Joseph Corré, who emigrated from France in 1776. He served as a cook to Major Richard Crewe of the British 17th Light Dragoons. Within a few months in October 1776, Joseph established his own confectionery and catering business in New York City, which expanded to include a hotel, tavern, ice cream shop and two theaters. He was self-promoted and innovative, which allowed him to excel in the social scene. This allowed for his daughter Mary to marry a socialite, John Griffith (1768–1815), a wealthy New York City merchant. John's family had connections in Burlington, New Jersey, Philadelphia, and New York City. Many of his relatives were involved in New Jersey politics and societies.

After the death of her husband, Griffith spent time between her homes in Burlington, New Jersey and relatives and friends in Dutchess County, New York, as well as between New York City and Philadelphia, where his daughter and son-in-law settled in 1817. She began writing short stories, and published them through her publishing connections at companies such as Wharton. While working with Wharton, she expanded her literary interests.

In 1820, Griffith purchased an estate, "Charlieshope", on the Raritan River west of New Brunswick, New Jersey, in Franklin Township, Somerset County, New Jersey. This move led to her increased interest in natural phenomena. She performed experiments in horticulture, natural history, economic entomology, the earth sciences, epidemiology, and optics and vision, publishing her results in scientific and literary journals and newspapers. Griffith died in Red Hook, Dutchess County, New York in 1846.

== Selected works ==
- Our Neighborhood, or Letters on Horticulture and Natural Phenomena (1831)
- Camperdown, or News from Our Neighborhood (1836)
- Discoveries in Light and Vision (1836)
- The Two Defaulters (1842)
- Three Hundred Years Hence (1950, originally included in Camperdown)
