= Mind control in popular culture =

Mind control is a recurring trope in popular culture, particularly in works of dystopian fiction and science fiction. It refers to the ability of one entity—whether an individual, organization, or technological system—to manipulate or dominate the thoughts, emotions, or actions of another, often against that person's will. The trope reflects longstanding human anxieties about free will, autonomy, and the influence of power, ideology, and technology on consciousness and behavior.

In fiction, mind control is portrayed through a wide range of mechanisms, including brainwashing, hypnosis (see Hypnosis in fiction), propaganda, psionic or telepathic powers, and technological means such as neural implants, nanotechnology, and subliminal messaging. Early examples can be found in Greek mythology—notably in the mesmerizing songs of the Sirens—and in the 19th-century Gothic fascination with hypnotism and mesmerism. The theme gained particular prominence in 20th-century literature and film, where it became associated with totalitarian governments, alien invasions, and Cold War fears of psychological manipulation.

Throughout its history, the motif of mind control has served as a metaphor for political oppression, ideological conformity, and the loss of individuality under modern social and technological systems. It continues to appear in contemporary media, ranging from comic books and television series to cyberpunk narratives, where it is often reinterpreted in light of emerging technologies and concerns about surveillance, data privacy, and artificial intelligence.

== History ==
Cover of Trilby (1894), one of the most influential early fiction works featuring the theme of hypnosis

The concept of mind control in fiction is old. Greek mythos contains stories about the alluring voice of the sirens and the concept of a love potion; a related trope of hypnosis was popularized in the 19th century works of Gothic fiction, with works like George du Maurier's Trilby (1894) and Bram Stoker's Dracula (1897) being particularly influential. It was explored in early modern dystopian works exploring extreme means to circumvent people's consent (Yevgeny Zamyatin's We, Aldous Huxley's Brave New World, Arthur Koestler's Darkness at Noon, and George Orwell's Nineteen Eighty-Four). The latter became so influential that concepts such as Big Brother, doublethink, and newspeak have entered the English language, while the adjective Orwellian is often used to describe environments where extreme propaganda and similar tools are used to control the populace. The trope also appeared in the works of early science fiction writers in non-English languages, such as Russian writer Fyodor Ilyin.

More modern trope of mind control (often called brainwashing – a term that emerged and became popularized in the 1950s) was popularized in the United States due to anti-communism fears during the Red Scare of the 1950s as well as leaks about American intelligence projects like MKUltra that emerged a decade later. It was consequently seen in works of fiction such as William Cameron Menzies's Invaders from Mars, where the Martians are shown to have various psychic powers; or even more directly in influential The Manchurian Candidate (originally 1959, with film adaptations in 1962 and 2004), where brainwashing is a tool used by the communist powers to turn captive American soldiers into agents. The trope has endured particularly in science fiction, and includes concepts such as brain implants and futuristic cyberpunk technologies. It has also been popular in young adult fiction, where it introduces young readers to the concept that they can be subject to control from more nefarious forces than just traditional rules and norms. In the American context this has also been connected to the phenomena of school shooting and attempts to control the youth in their aftermath (e.g., Francine Prose's After).

== Users and uses ==
Use of mind control is typically associated with villainous characters, although such characters may perceive themselves as acting for a greater good that necessitates depriving people of their free will. An example of this is in the Marvel Comics series, Emperor Doom, in which the archvillain Doctor Doom uses mind control over the people of Earth to bring about world peace and equitable distribution of resources; when the heroes escape this control, some of them wonder if the world would be better off left this way. They ultimately opt to restore free will. Comic book villains with mind control powers include ones like Mad Hatter, Pied Piper and Universo from DC Comics; and the Enchantress, Mesmero, and the Ringmaster from Marvel Comics. An example of a magic user with mind control powers is the Lady of the Green Kirtle (the Green Witch) from C. S. Lewis's The Silver Chair.

On a larger scale, in some usually dystopian works, mind control is used by (often totalitarian) governments to control societies (e.g., Unno Jūza's "Eighteen O'Clock Music Bath", Frank Herbert's The Green Brain, Fernando Spiner The Sleepwalker, Nancy Farmer's The House of the Scorpion, Suzanne Collins's The Hunger Games, or Cory Doctorow's Little Brother). In others it is a weapon, used for example by the invading or inflitrating aliens (e.g., Robert A. Heinlein The Puppet Masters, John Christopher The Tripods trilogy, V television show, or Adam Niswander's The Sand Dwellers). From the 1970s onward, in addition to the state, commercial enterprises have been also fingered as actors likely to use this tool (e.g., Michael Crichton's Drug of Choice, Robin Cook's Mindbend, Pam Bachorz Candor). Quasi-religious cults and criminal organizations have been another mezo scale villain (e.g., Robert Cormier's The Chocolate War), as can be small scale experiments gone wrong (for example, The Wave by Todd Strasser portrays a real-life school history project that ends up with students parroting Nazi behaviors).

Occasionally mind control is portrayed positively, such as in the case of hypnosis used for accelerated learning (as seen, for example, in John W. Campbell's "The Brain Stealers of Mars").

Depending on the scale and intensity, mind control can be divided into soft and hard. The latter refers to the more realistic usage of tools like mass media and propaganda, indirectly influencing people. The former refers to the more science-fictionish tools of more directly seizing control over affected individuals.

== Means ==
Mind control can be realized in various ways. Extreme forms of indoctrination and censorship, such as the propaganda from George Orwell's Nineteen Eighty-Four and the anti-intellectual book burning campaign of Ray Bradbury's Fahrenheit 451 have been described as a form of mind control.

A common explanation for more advanced, powerful and throughout mind control is brainwashing, popularized through works such as George Orwell's Nineteen Eighty-Four and Richard Condon's The Manchurian Candidate. Technologies used to achieve mind control include drugs (e.g., Huxley's Brave New World, Crichton's Drug of Choice), mind-control rays (e.g., Arkady and Boris Strugatsky's Prisoners of Power, Krzysztof Boruń's Małe zielone ludziki), or more modern concepts such as nanotechnology (e.g., the Borg introduced in Star Trek: The Next Generation, Justina Robson's Mappa Mundi,) and brain implant (Bernard Girard's The Mind Snatchers, Michael Crichton's The Terminal Man, or Lewis Shiner's Frontera). The hero of A. E. van Vogt's Slan uses mind-controlling crystals, described as a mechanical device. Magic is another explanation. More down-to-earth, psychiatrical treatment can be the culprit (e.g., Anthony Burgess's A Clockwork Orange). Biology (the term biocontrol is sometimes used in this context) offers another way (e.g., irresistible pheromones in John Brunner's Children of the Thunder, viruses in Jessica Jones). Hypnosis, sometimes tied to technologies such as subliminal advertising, and sometimes seen as a biological phenomena, provides yet another avenue (e.g., T. H. White's The Master: An Adventure Story, many episodes of TV shows like X-Files and Doctor Who or superhero comics). Another is offered through psychic (psionic) powers (e.g., The Force of Star Wars, as seen in the iconic phrase "These aren't the droids you're looking for"). The latter can be acquired through mutation (e.g., Henry Kuttner's "Mutant", and Isaac Asimov's Foundation saga with its mind-controlling antagonist The Mule). They can be linked to concepts such as telepathy. The border between technology and biology can blur; for example in Isaac Asimov's The Robots of Dawn the mind control psychic powers are wielded by a robot.

== Analysis ==
Mind control is a common trope in fiction, particularly science fiction, often explained through the use of some form of technology. It has become common in dystopian fiction.

David Seed saw this trope as reflecting the mixture of social desire and fear for technology, writing that "at the beginning of the postwar period mind control was imagined as an invasion of mental space by an alien force. By the 1980s and 1990s, however, it has become impossible to separate the human from the technological. This intermeshing is reflected in the ambivalent perceptions of technology, which proves to be desired but destructive".

Terry O'Brien in The Greenwood Encyclopedia of Science Fiction and Fantasy comments: "Mind control is such a powerful image that if hypnotism did not exist, then something similar would have to have been invented: the plot device is too useful for any writer to ignore. The fear of mind control is equally as powerful an image."

Patric Jones argued that mind control fiction exposes the tension between safety and freedom, especially for youth. Sci-fi works like Candor, After, and Little Brother show how adults' well-intentioned efforts to create order and security can gradually erode liberty. These novels, echoing more realistic The Wave and The Chocolate War, highlight how social fears—crime, terrorism, failure—lead to increasing control over individuals, particularly teens. Ultimately, they warn that freedom may vanish not through violence but through quiet, everyday intrusions—tests, surveillance, subliminal conditioning—and celebrate young protagonists who resist such control in the enduring struggle for independence.

== See also ==
- Cult
- Memory erasure
- Orwellian
