= History of science fiction =

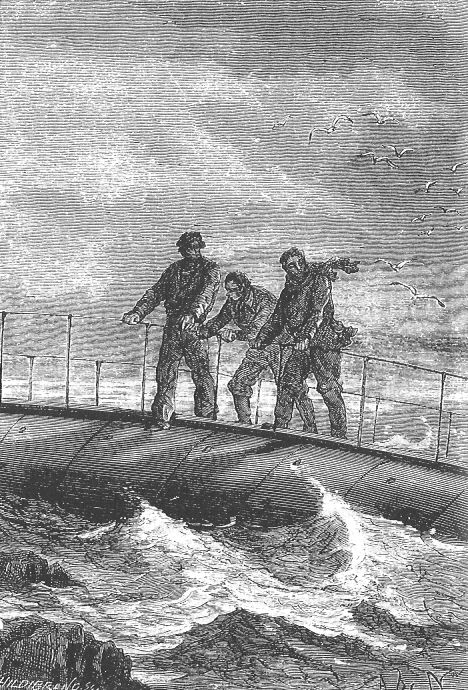
Twenty Thousand Leagues Under the Seas illustration by Neuville and Riou. Twenty Thousand Leagues Under the Seas, Jules Verne's 1870 novel, is considered one of the earliest works of modern science fiction.

The literary genre of science fiction is diverse, and its exact definition remains a contested question among both scholars and devotees. This lack of consensus is reflected in debates about the genre's history, particularly over determining its exact origins.

Some writers have identified precursors to the genre in ancient literature such as the Sumerian Epic of Gilgamesh (earliest Sumerian text versions c. 2150–2000 BCE). Others argue that science fiction only became possible sometime between the 17th and early 19th centuries, following the Scientific Revolution and major discoveries in astronomy, physics, and mathematics.

Science fiction developed and boomed in the 20th century, as the deep integration of science and inventions into daily life encouraged a greater interest in literature that explores the relationship between technology, society, and the individual. Scholar Robert Scholes calls the history of science fiction "the history of humanity's changing attitudes toward space and time ... the history of our growing understanding of the universe and the position of our species in that universe". In recent decades, the genre has diversified and become firmly established as a major influence on global culture and thought.

== Early science fiction ==
=== Ancient and early modern precursors ===
One of the earliest and most commonly-cited texts for those looking for early precursors to science fiction is the ancient Mesopotamian Epic of Gilgamesh, with the earliest text versions identified as being from about 2000 BCE. American science fiction author Lester del Rey was one such supporter of using Gilgamesh as an origin point, arguing that "science fiction is precisely as old as the first recorded fiction. That is The Epic of Gilgamesh." French science fiction writer Pierre Versins also argued that Gilgamesh was the first science fiction work due to its treatment of human reason and the quest for immortality. In addition, Gilgamesh features a flood scene that in some ways resembles a work of apocalyptic science fiction. However, the lack of explicit science or technology in the work has led some to argue that it is better categorized as fantastic literature.

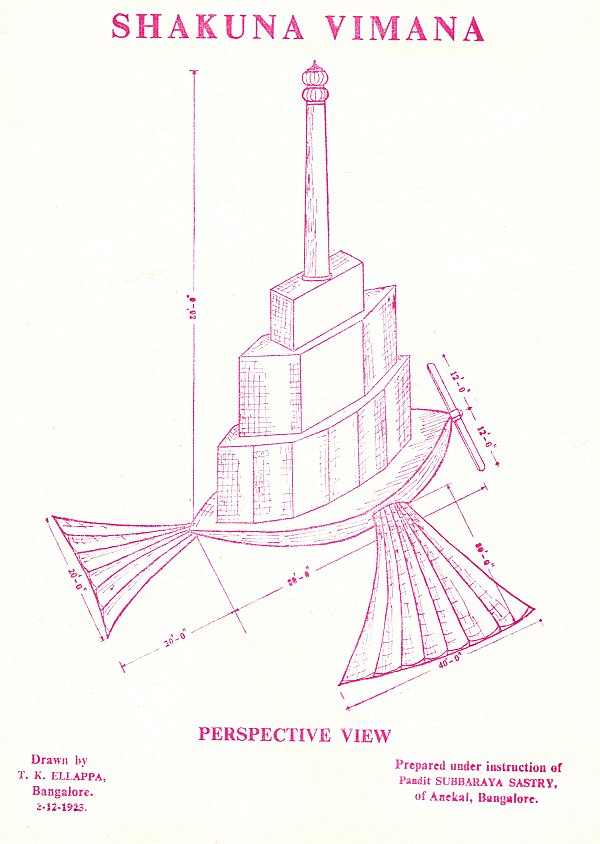
1923 illustration of the Shakuna Vimana

Ancient Indian poetry such as the Hindu epic the Ramayana (5th to 4th century BCE) includes Vimana, flying machines able to travel into space or under water, and destroy entire cities using advanced weapons. In the first book of the Rigveda collection of Sanskrit hymns (1700–1100 BCE), there is a description of "mechanical birds" that are seen "jumping into space speedily with a craft using fire and water ... containing twelve stamghas (pillars), one wheel, three machines, 300 pivots, and 60 instruments". The ancient Hindu mythological epic the Mahabharata (8th and 9th centuries BCE) includes the story of King Kakudmi, who travels to heaven to meet the creator Brahma and is shocked to learn that many ages have passed when he returns to Earth, anticipating the concept of time travel.

William Strang illustration of Lucian's interplanetary giant spider battle

One frequently cited text is the Syrian-Greek writer Lucian of Samosata's 2nd-century satire True History, which uses a voyage to outer space and conversations with alien life forms to comment on the use of exaggeration within travel literature and debates. Typical science fiction themes and topoi in True History include travel to outer space, encounter with alien life-forms (including the experience of a first encounter event), interplanetary warfare and planetary imperialism, motif of giganticism, creatures as products of human technology, worlds working by a set of alternative physical laws, and an explicit desire of the protagonist for exploration and adventure. In witnessing one interplanetary battle between the People of the Moon and the People of the Sun as the fight for the right to colonize the Morning Star, Lucian describes giant space spiders who were "appointed to spin a web in the air between the Moon and the Morning Star, which was done in an instant, and made a plain campaign upon which the foot forces were planted". L. Sprague de Camp and a number of other authors argue this to be one of the earliest if not the earliest example of science fiction or proto-science fiction. However, since the text was intended to be explicitly satirical and hyperbolic, other critics are ambivalent about its rightful place as a science fiction precursor. For example, English critic Kingsley Amis wrote that "It is hardly science-fiction, since it deliberately piles extravagance upon extravagance for comic effect" and Lucian translator Bryan Reardon describes the work as "an account of a fantastic journey – to the moon, the underworld, the belly of a whale, and so forth. It is not really science fiction, although it has sometimes been called that; there is no 'science' in it."

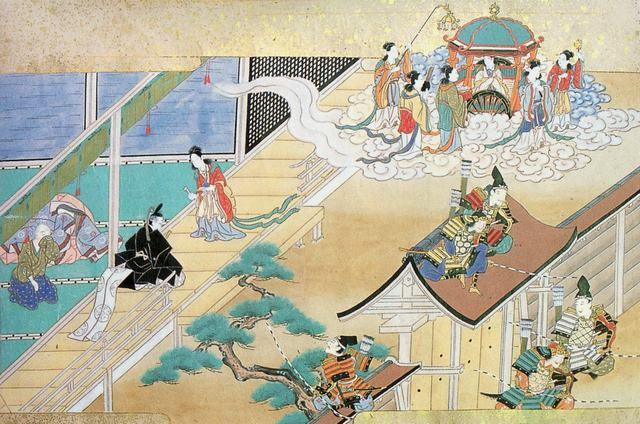
Kaguya-hime returning to the Moon in The Tale of the Bamboo Cutter

The early Japanese tale of Urashima Tarō involves traveling forwards in time to a distant future, and was first described in the Nihongi (written in 720). It was about a young fisherman named Urashima Tarō who visits an undersea palace and stays there for three days. After returning home to his village, he finds himself 300 years in the future, where he is long forgotten, his house is in ruins, and his family long dead. The 10th-century Japanese narrative The Tale of the Bamboo Cutter may also be considered proto-science fiction. The protagonist of the story, Kaguya-hime, is a princess from the Moon who is sent to Earth for safety during a celestial war, and is found and raised by a bamboo cutter in Japan. She is later taken back to the Moon by her real extraterrestrial family. A manuscript illustration depicts a round flying machine similar to a flying saucer.

=== One Thousand and One Nights ===
Several stories within the One Thousand and One Nights (Arabian Nights, 8th–10th centuries CE) also feature science fiction elements. One example is "The Adventures of Bulukiya", where the protagonist Bulukiya's quest for the herb of immortality leads him to explore the seas, journey to the Garden of Eden and to Jahannam (Islamic hell), and travel across the cosmos to different worlds much larger than his own world, anticipating elements of galactic science fiction; along the way, he encounters societies of jinn, mermaids, talking serpents, talking trees, and other forms of life.

In "Abdullah the Fisherman and Abdullah the Merman", the protagonist gains the ability to breathe underwater and discovers an underwater submarine society that is portrayed as an inverted reflection of society on land, in that the underwater society follows a form of primitive communism where concepts like money and clothing do not exist.

Other Arabian Nights tales deal with lost ancient technologies, advanced ancient civilizations that went astray, and catastrophes which overwhelmed them. "The City of Brass" features a group of travellers on an archaeological expedition across the Sahara to find an ancient lost city and attempt to recover a brass vessel that the biblical King Solomon once used to trap a jinn, and, along the way, encounter a mummified queen, petrified inhabitants, lifelike humanoid robots and automata, seductive marionettes dancing without strings, and a brass robot horseman who directs the party towards the ancient city.

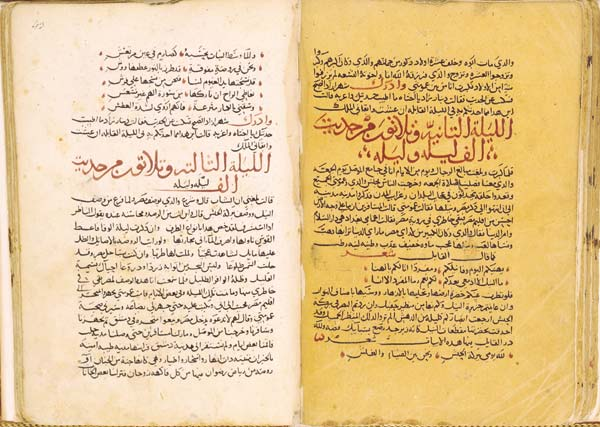
Arabic manuscript of the One Thousand and One Nights

"The Ebony Horse" features a robot in the form of a flying mechanical horse controlled using keys, that could fly into outer space and towards the Sun, while the "Third Qalandar's Tale" also features a robot in the form of an uncanny sailor. "The City of Brass" and "The Ebony Horse" can be considered early examples of proto-science fiction. Other examples of early Arabic proto-science fiction include al-Farabi's Opinions of the Residents of a Splendid City about a utopian society, and certain Arabian Nights elements such as the flying carpet.

=== Other medieval literature ===
According to Dr. Abu Shadi al-Roubi, the final two chapters of the Arabic theological novel Fādil ibn Nātiq (c. 1270), also known as Theologus Autodidactus, by the Arabian polymath writer Ibn al-Nafis (1213–1288) can be described as science fiction. The theological novel deals with various science fiction elements such as spontaneous generation, futurology, apocalyptic themes, eschatology, resurrection and the afterlife, but rather than giving supernatural or mythological explanations for these events, Ibn al-Nafis attempted to explain these plot elements using his own extensive scientific knowledge in anatomy, biology, physiology, astronomy, cosmology and geology. For example, it was through this novel that Ibn al-Nafis introduces his scientific theory of metabolism, and he makes references to his own scientific discovery of pulmonary circulation in order to explain bodily resurrection. The novel was later translated into English as Theologus Autodidactus in the early 20th century.

During the European Middle Ages, science fictional themes appeared within many chivalric romance and legends. Robots and automata featured in romances starting in the twelfth century, with Le Pèlerinage de Charlemagne and Enéas among the first. The Roman de Troie, another twelfth-century work, features the famous Chambre de Beautes, which contained four automata, one of which held a magic mirror, one of which performed somersaults, one of which played musical instruments, and one which showed people what they most needed. Automata in these works were often ambivalently associated with necromancy, and frequently guarded entrances or provided warning of intruders. This association with necromancy often leads to the appearance of automata guarding tombs, as they do in Eneas, Floris and Blancheflour, and Le Roman d'Alexandre, while in Lancelot they appear in an underground palace. Automata did not have to be human, however. A brass horse is among the marvelous gifts given to the Cambyuskan in Geoffrey Chaucer's "The Squire's Tale". This metal horse is reminiscent of similar metal horses in middle eastern literature, and could take its rider anywhere in the world at extraordinary speed by turning a peg in its ear and whispering certain words into it. The brass horse is only one of the technological marvels which appears in "The Squire's Tale": the Cambyuskan, or Khan, also receives a mirror which reveals distant places, which the witnessing crowd explains as operating by the manipulation of angles and optics, and a sword which deals and heals deadly wounds, which the crowd explains as being possible using advanced smithing techniques.

Technological inventions are also rife in the Alexander romances. In John Gower's Confessio Amantis, for example, Alexander the Great constructs a flying machine by tying two griffins to a platform and dangling meat above them on a pole. This adventure is ended only by the direct intervention of God, who destroys the device and throws Alexander back to the ground. This does not, however, stop the legendary Alexander, who proceeds to construct a gigantic orb of glass which he uses to travel beneath the water. There, he sees extraordinary marvels which eventually exceed his comprehension.

States similar to suspended animation also appear in medieval romances, such as the Historia destructionis Troiae and the Roman d’Eneas. In the former, King Priam has the body of the hero Hector entombed in a network of golden tubes that run through his body. Through these tubes ran the semi-legendary fluid balsam which was then reputed to have the power to preserve life. This fluid kept the corpse of Hector preserved as if he was still alive, maintaining him in a persistent vegetative state during which autonomic processes such as the growth of facial hair continued.

The boundaries between medieval fiction with scientific elements and medieval science can be fuzzy at best. In works such as Geoffrey Chaucer's "The House of Fame", it is proposed that the titular House of Fame is the natural home of sound, described as a ripping in the air, towards which all sound is eventually attracted, in the same way that the Earth was believed to be the natural home of earth to which it was all eventually attracted. Likewise, medieval travel narratives often contained science-fictional themes and elements. Works such as Mandeville's Travels included automata, alternate species and sub-species of humans, including Cynoencephali and Giants, and information about the sexual reproduction of diamonds. However, Mandeville's Travels and other travel narratives in its genre mix real geographical knowledge with knowledge now known to be fictional, and it is therefore difficult to distinguish which portions should be considered science fictional or would have been seen as such in the Middle Ages.

=== Proto-science fiction in the Enlightenment and Age of Reason ===
In the wake of scientific discoveries that characterized the Enlightenment, several new types of literature began to take shape in 16th-century Europe. The humanist thinker Thomas More's 1516 work of fiction and political philosophy entitled Utopia describes a fictional island whose inhabitants have perfected every aspect of their society. The name of the society stuck, giving rise to the Utopia motif that would become so widespread in later science fiction to describe a world that is seemingly perfect but either ultimately unattainable or perversely flawed. The Faust legend (1587) contains an early prototype for the mad scientist story.

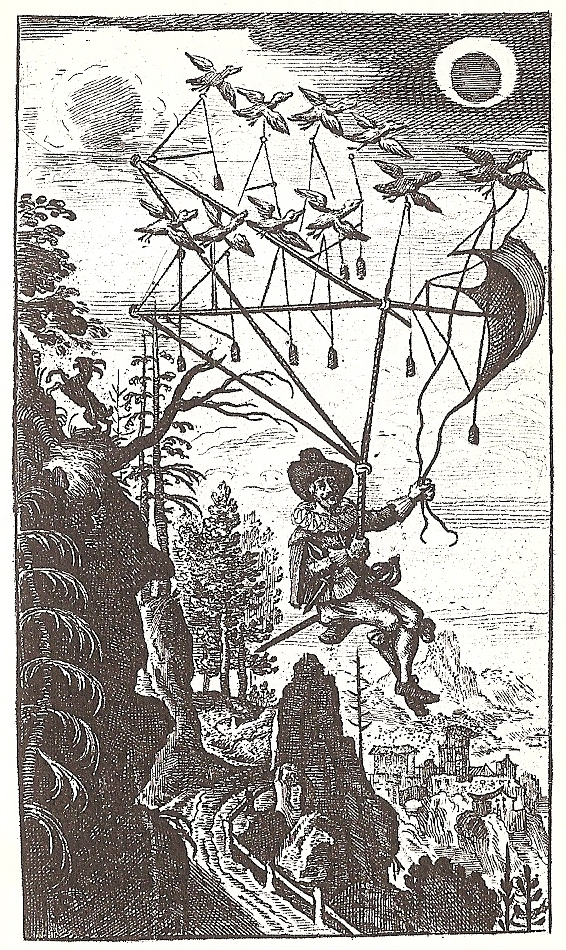
Frontispiece of the 1659 German translation of Godwin's The Man in the Moone

In the 17th and 18th centuries, the so-called "Age of Reason" and widespread interest in scientific discovery fueled the creation of speculative fiction that anticipated many of the tropes of more recent science fiction. Several works expanded on imaginary voyages to the Moon, first in Johannes Kepler's Somnium (The Dream, 1634), which both Carl Sagan and Isaac Asimov have referred to as the first work of science fiction. Similarly, some identify Francis Godwin's The Man in the Moone (1638) as the first work of science fiction in English, and Cyrano de Bergerac's Comical History of the States and Empires of the Moon (1656). Space travel also figures prominently in Voltaire's Micromégas (1752), which is also notable for the suggestion that people of other worlds may be in some ways more advanced than those of Earth.

Other works containing proto-science-fiction elements from the Age of Reason of the 17th and 18th centuries include (in chronological order):

- Shakespeare's The Tempest (1610–11) contains a prototype for the "mad scientist story".
- Francis Bacon's New Atlantis (1627), an incomplete utopian novel.
- Margaret Cavendish's The Description of a New World, Called the Blazing-World (1666), a novel that describes another world (with different stars in the sky) that can be reached via the North Pole.
- Daniel Defoe's The Consolidator (1705) revolves around a voyage to the Moon.
- Simon Tyssot de Patot's Voyages et Aventures de Jacques Massé (1710) features a Lost World.
- Simon Tyssot de Patot's La Vie, Les Aventures et Le Voyage de Groenland du Révérend Père Cordelier Pierre de Mésange (1720) features a Hollow Earth.
- Jonathan Swift's Gulliver's Travels (1726) contains descriptions of alien cultures and "weird science".
- Samuel Madden's Memoirs of the Twentieth Century (1733) in which a narrator from 1728 is given a series of state documents from 1997 to 1998 by his guardian angel, a plot device which is reminiscent of later time travel novels. However, the story does not explain how the angel obtained these documents.
- Ludvig Holberg's Niels Klim's Underground Travels (1741) is an early example of the Hollow Earth genre.
- Louis-Sébastien Mercier's L'An 2440 (1771) gives a predictive account of life in the 25th century.
- Nicolas-Edmé Restif de la Bretonne's La Découverte Australe par un Homme Volant (1781) features prophetic inventions.
- Giacomo Casanova's Icosameron (1788) is a novel that makes use of the hollow Earth device.

== 19th-century transitions ==
=== Shelley and Europe in the early 19th century ===
Mary Shelley by Richard Rothwell (1840–41)

The 19th century saw a major acceleration of these trends and features, most clearly seen in the groundbreaking publication of Mary Shelley's Frankenstein; or, The Modern Prometheus in 1818. The short novel features the archetypal "mad scientist" experimenting with advanced technology. In his book Billion Year Spree, Brian Aldiss claims Frankenstein represents "the first seminal work to which the label SF can be logically attached". It is also the first of the "mad scientist" subgenre. Although normally associated with the gothic horror genre, the novel introduces science fiction themes such as the use of technology for achievements beyond the scope of science at the time, and the alien as antagonist, furnishing a view of the human condition from an outside perspective. Aldiss argues that science fiction in general derives its conventions from the gothic novel. Mary Shelley's short story "Roger Dodsworth: The Reanimated Englishman" (1826) sees a man frozen in ice revived in the present day, incorporating the now common science fiction theme of cryonics whilst also exemplifying Shelley's use of science as a conceit to drive her stories. Another futuristic Shelley novel, The Last Man, has been cited as the first dystopian novel.

In 1836 Alexander Veltman published Predki Kalimerosa: Aleksandr Filippovich Makedonskii (The forebears of Kalimeros: Alexander, son of Philip of Macedon), which has been called the first original Russian science fiction novel and the first novel to use time travel. Albeit time travel achieved via a magical hippogriff rather than technological means. The narrator meets Aristotle, and goes on a voyage with Alexander the Great before returning to the 19th century.

Somehow influenced by the scientific theories of the 19th century, but most certainly by the idea of human progress, Victor Hugo wrote in The Legend of the Centuries (1859) a long poem in two parts that can be viewed like a dystopia/utopia fiction, called 20th century. It shows in a first scene the body of a broken huge ship, the greatest product of the prideful and foolish mankind that called it Leviathan, wandering in a desert world where the winds blow and the anger of the wounded Nature is; humanity, finally reunited and pacified, has gone toward the stars in a starship, to look for and to bring liberty into the light.

Other notable proto-science fiction authors and works of the early 19th century include:

- Jean-Baptiste Cousin de Grainville's Le Dernier Homme (1805, The Last Man).
- Historian Félix Bodin's Le Roman de l'Avenir (1834) and Emile Souvestre's Le Monde Tel Qu'il Sera (1846), two novels which try to predict what the next century will be like.
- Jane C. Loudon's The Mummy!: Or a Tale of the Twenty-Second Century (1827), in which Cheops is revived by scientific means into a world in political crisis, where technology has advanced to gas-flame jewelry and houses that migrate on rails, etc.
- Louis Geoffroy's Napoleon et la Conquête du Monde (1836), an alternate history of a world conquered by Napoleon.
- C.I. Defontenay's Star ou Psi de Cassiopée (1854), an Olaf Stapledon-like chronicle of an alien world and civilization.
- Slovak author Gustáv Reuss's Gustáv Reuss Hviezdoveda alebo životopis Krutohlava, čo na Zemi, okolo Mesiaca a Slnka skúsil a čo o obežniciach, vlasaticiach, pôvode a konci sveta vedel ("The Science of the Stars or The Life of Krutohlav who Visited the Moon and the Sun and Knew about Planets, Comets and the Beginning and the End of the World" ) (1856). In this book Gustáv Reuss sends his hero named Krutohlav, a scholar from the Gemer region, right to the Moon... in a balloon. When the hero comes back, he builds a sort of a dragon-like interstellar ship, in which the characters travel around the whole known Solar System and eventually visit all the countries of the Earth.
- Astronomer Camille Flammarion's La Pluralité des Mondes Habités (1862) which speculated on extraterrestrial life.
- Edward S. Ellis's The Steam Man of the Prairies (1868) The first novel starts when Ethan Hopkins and Mickey McSquizzle—a "Yankee" and an "Irishman"—encounter a colossal, steam-powered man in the American prairies. This steam-man was constructed by Johnny Brainerd, a teenaged boy, who uses the steam-man to carry him in a carriage on various adventures.
- Edward Bulwer-Lytton's The Coming Race (1871), a novel where the main character discovers a highly evolved subterranean civilization. PSI-powers are given a logical and scientific explanation, achieved through biological evolution and technological progress, rather than something magical or supernatural.

=== Verne and Wells ===
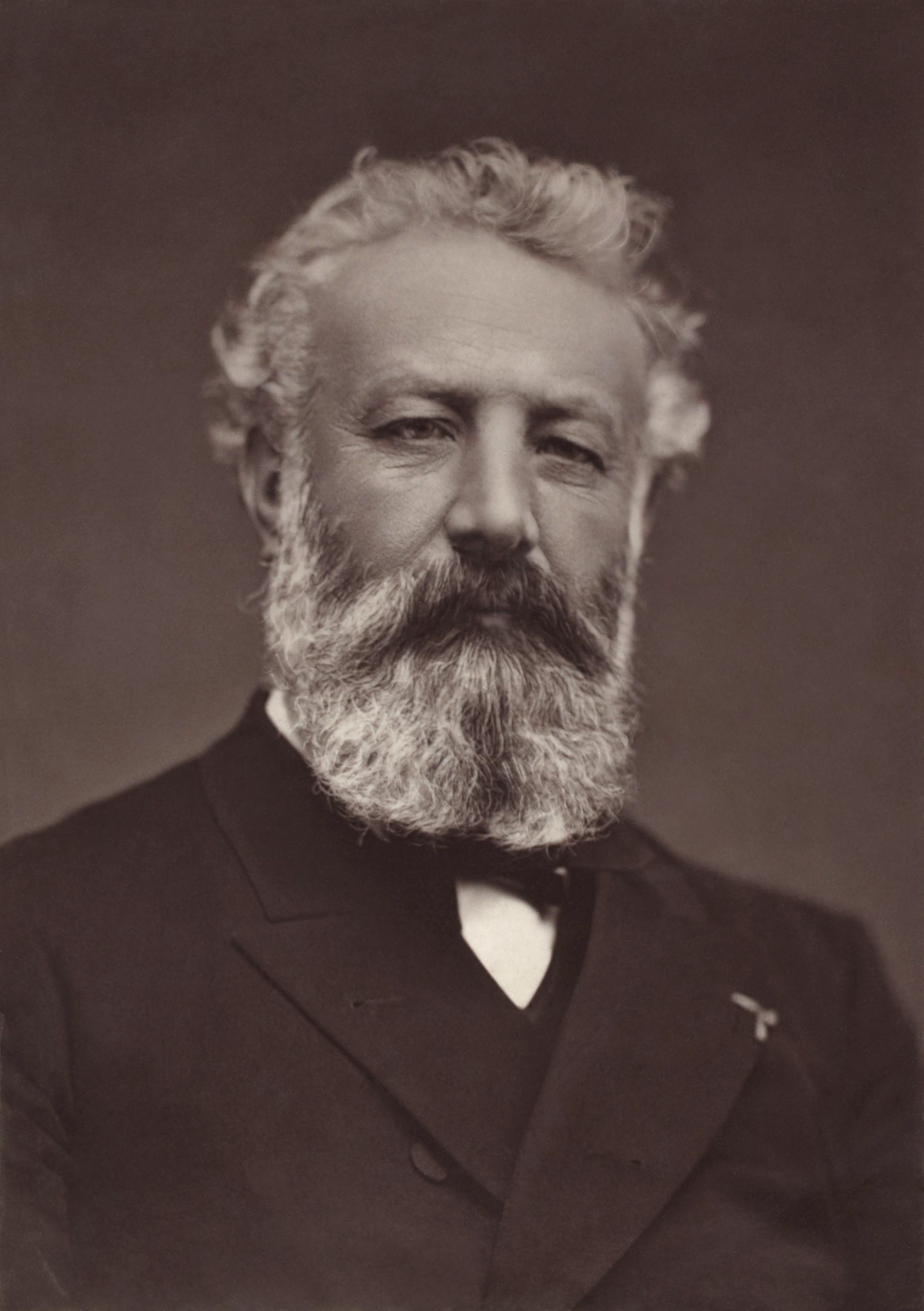
Jules Verne

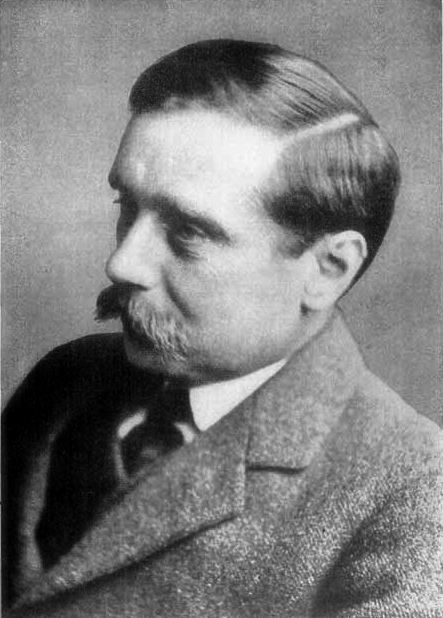
H. G. Wells

The European brand of science fiction proper began later in the 19th century with the scientific romances of H.G. Wells and the science-oriented, socially critical novels of Jules Verne. Verne's adventure stories, notably Journey to the Center of the Earth (1864), From the Earth to the Moon (1865), and Twenty Thousand Leagues Under the Seas (1869) mixed daring romantic adventure with technology that was either up to the minute or logically extrapolated into the future. They were tremendous commercial successes and established that an author could make a career out of such whimsical material. L. Sprague de Camp calls Verne "the world's first full-time science fiction novelist."

Wells's stories, on the other hand, use science fiction devices to make didactic points about his society. In The Time Machine (1895), for example, the technical details of the machine are glossed over quickly so that the Time Traveller can tell a story that criticizes the stratification of English society. The story also uses Darwinian evolution (as would be expected in a former student of Darwin's champion, Huxley), and shows an awareness of Marxism. In The War of the Worlds (1898), the Martians' technology is not explained as it would have been in a Verne story, and the story is resolved by a deus ex machina, albeit a scientifically explained one.

The differences between Verne and Wells highlight a tension that has existed in science fiction throughout its history. The question of whether to present realistic technology or to focus on characters and ideas has been ever-present, as has the question of whether to tell an exciting story or make a didactic point.

=== Late 19th-century expansion ===
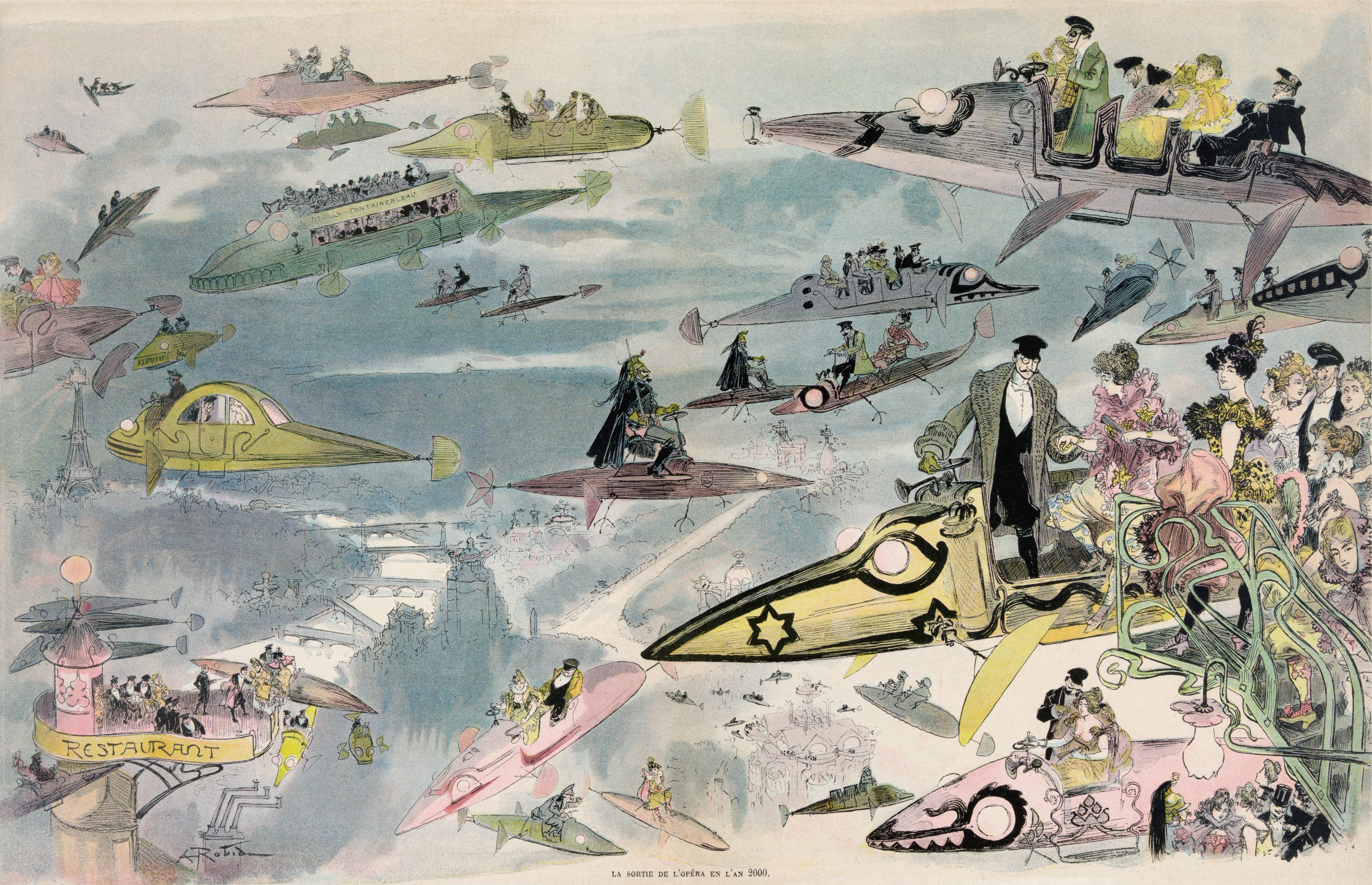
Leaving the opera in the year 2000, hand-coloured lithograph by Albert Robida (late 19th century)

Wells and Verne had quite a few rivals in early science fiction. Short stories and novelettes with themes of fantastic imagining appeared in journals throughout the late 19th century and many of these employed scientific ideas as the springboard to the imagination. Erewhon is a novel by Samuel Butler published in 1872 and dealing with the concept that machines could one day become sentient and supplant the human race. In 1886 the novel The Future Eve by French author Auguste Villiers de l'Isle-Adam was published, where Thomas Edison builds an artificial woman. Although better known for Sherlock Holmes, Sir Arthur Conan Doyle also wrote early science fiction, particularly using the character of Professor Challenger. Rudyard Kipling's contributions to the genre in the early 1900s made Campbell describe him as "the first modern science fiction writer". Other writers in the field were Bengali science fiction authors such as Sukumar Ray and Begum Roquia Sakhawat Hussain, who wrote the earliest known feminist science fiction work, Sultana's Dream. Another early feminist science fiction work at the time was Charlotte Perkins Gilman's Herland. Wells and Verne both had an international readership and influenced writers in America, especially. Soon a home-grown American science fiction was thriving. European writers found more readers by selling to the American market and writing in an Americanised style.

=== American proto-science fiction in the 19th century ===
In the last decades of the 19th century, works of science fiction for adults and children were numerous in America, though it was not yet given the name "science fiction." There were science-fiction elements in the stories of Nathaniel Hawthorne and Fitz-James O'Brien. Edgar Allan Poe is often mentioned with Verne and Wells as the founders of science fiction (although Mary Shelley's Frankenstein predates these). A number of Poe's short stories and the novel The Narrative of Arthur Gordon Pym of Nantucket are science fictional. An 1827 satiric novel by philosopher George Tucker A Voyage to the Moon is sometimes cited as the first American science fiction novel.

In 1835 Edgar Allan Poe published a short story, "The Unparalleled Adventure of One Hans Pfaall" in which a flight to the Moon in a balloon is described. It has an account of the launch, the construction of the cabin, descriptions of strata and many more science-like aspects. In addition to Poe's account the story written in 1813 by the Dutch Willem Bilderdijk is remarkable. In his novel Kort verhaal van eene aanmerkelijke luchtreis en nieuwe planeetontdekking (Short account of a remarkable journey into the skies and discovery of a new planet) Bilderdijk tells of a European somewhat stranded in an Arabic country where he boasts he is able to build a balloon that can lift people and let them fly through the air. The gasses used turn out to be far more powerful than expected and after a while he lands on a planet positioned between Earth and Moon. The writer uses the story to portray an overview of scientific knowledge concerning the Moon in all sorts of aspects the traveller to that place would encounter. Quite a few similarities can be found in the story Poe published some twenty years later.

John Leonard Riddell, a Professor of Chemistry in New Orleans, published the short story Orrin Lindsay's plan of aerial navigation, with a narrative of his explorations in the higher regions of the atmosphere, and his wonderful voyage round the moon! in 1847 on a pamphlet. It tells the story of the student Orrin Lindsay who invents an alloy that prevents gravitational attraction, and in a spherical craft leaves Earth and travel to the Moon. The story contains algebra and scientific footnotes, which makes it an early example of hard science fiction.

Unitarian minister and writer Edward Everett Hale wrote The Brick Moon, a Verne-inspired novella, first published serially in 1869 in The Atlantic Monthly, notable as the first work to describe an artificial satellite. Written in much the same style as his other work, it employs pseudo-journalistic realism to tell an adventure story with little basis in reality.

William Henry Rhodes published in 1871 the tale The Case of Summerfield in the Sacramento Union newspaper, and introduced weapon of mass destruction. A mad scientist and villain called Black Bart makes an attempt to blackmail the world with a powder made of potassium, able to destroy the planet by turning its waters into fire.

The newspaperman Edward Page Mitchell would publish his innovative science fiction short stories in The Sun for more than a decade, except for his first story which was published in Scribner's Monthly in 1874. His stories included invisibility, faster than light travels, teleportation, time travel, cryogenics, mind transfer, mutants, cyborgs and mechanical brains.

One of the most successful works of early American science fiction was the second-best selling novel in the U.S. in the 19th century: Edward Bellamy's Looking Backward (1888), its effects extending far beyond the field of literature. Looking Backward extrapolates a future society based on observation of the current society.

Mark Twain explored themes of science in his novel A Connecticut Yankee in King Arthur's Court. By means of "transmigration of souls", "transposition of epochs – and bodies" Twain's Yankee is transported back in time and his knowledge of 19th-century technology with him.

Charles Curtis Dail, a Kentucky lawyer, published in 1890 the novel Willmoth the Wanderer, or The Man from Saturn, had his protagonist travel through the Solar System by covering his body with an anti-gravity ointment.

== Early 20th century ==
American author L. Frank Baum's series of 14 books (1900–1920) based in his outlandish Land of Oz setting, contained depictions of strange weapons (Dorothy and the Wizard in Oz, Glinda of Oz), mechanical men (Tik-Tok of Oz) and a bevy of not-yet-realized technological inventions and devices including perhaps the first literary appearance of handheld wireless communicators (Tik-Tok of Oz).

Jack London wrote several science fiction stories, including "The Red One" (a story involving extraterrestrials), The Iron Heel (set in the future from London's point of view) and "The Unparalleled Invasion" (a story involving future germ warfare and ethnic cleansing). He also wrote a story about invisibility and a story about an irresistible energy weapon. These stories began to change the features of science fiction.

Rudyard Kipling's contributions to science fiction go beyond their direct impact at the start of the 20th century. The Aerial Board of Control stories and his critique of the British military, The Army of a Dream, were not only very modern in style, but strongly influenced authors like John W. Campbell and Robert A. Heinlein, the latter of whom wrote a novel, Starship Troopers (1959), that contains all of the elements of The Army of a Dream, and whose 1961 novel Stranger in a Strange Land can be compared to The Jungle Book, with the human child raised by Martians instead of wolves. Heinlein's technique of indirect exposition first appears in Kiplings' writing. Heinlein, a major influence on science fiction from the 1930s forward, has also described himself as influenced by George Bernard Shaw, whose longest work Back to Methuselah (1921) was itself science fiction.

Robert Hugh Benson wrote one of the first modern dystopias, Lord of the World (1907), partially in reaction to Wells' atheistic utopian writing, which Benson rejected as a Christian.

Edgar Rice Burroughs (1875–1950) began writing science fiction for pulp magazines just before World War I, getting his first story Under the Moons of Mars published in 1912. He continued to publish adventure stories, many of them science fiction, throughout the rest of his life. The pulps published adventure stories of all kinds. Science fiction stories had to fit in alongside murder mysteries, horror, fantasy and Edgar Rice Burroughs' own Tarzan.

The next great science fiction writers after H. G. Wells were Olaf Stapledon (1886–1950), whose four major works Last and First Men (1930), Odd John (1935), Star Maker (1937), and Sirius (1944), introduced a myriad of ideas that writers have since adopted, and J.-H. Rosny aîné, born in Belgium, the father of "modern" French science fiction, a writer also comparable to H. G. Wells, who wrote the classic Les Xipehuz (1887) and La Mort de la Terre (1910). However, the Twenties and Thirties would see the genre represented in a new format.

=== Birth of the pulps ===
The development of American science fiction as a self-conscious genre dates in part from 1926, when Hugo Gernsback founded Amazing Stories magazine, which was devoted exclusively to science fiction stories. Though science fiction magazines had been published in Germany before, Amazing Stories was the first English language magazine to solely publish science fiction. Since he is notable for having chosen the variant term scientifiction to describe this incipient genre, the stage in the genre's development, his name and the term "scientifiction" are often thought to be inextricably linked. Though Gernsback encouraged stories featuring scientific realism to educate his readers about scientific principles, such stories shared the pages with exciting stories with little basis in reality. Much of what Gernsback published was referred to as "gadget fiction", about what happens when someone makes a technological invention. Published in this and other pulp magazines with great and growing success, such scientifiction stories were not viewed as serious literature but as sensationalism. Nevertheless, a magazine devoted entirely to science fiction was a great boost to the public awareness of the scientific speculation story. Amazing Stories competed with several other pulp magazines, including Weird Tales (which primarily published fantasy stories), Astounding Stories, and Wonder Stories, throughout the 1930s. It was in the Gernsback era that science fiction fandom arose through the medium of the "Letters to the Editor" columns of Amazing and its competitors. In August 1928, Amazing Stories published Skylark of Space and Armageddon 2419 A.D., while Weird Tales published Edmond Hamilton's Crashing Suns, all of which represented the birth of space opera.

Fritz Lang's movie Metropolis (1927), in which the first cinematic humanoid robot was seen, and the Italian Futurists' love of machines are indicative of both the hopes and fears of the world between the world wars. Metropolis was an extremely successful film and its art-deco inspired aesthetic became the guiding aesthetic of the science fiction pulps for some time.

In the late 1930s, John W. Campbell became editor of Astounding Science Fiction, the second magazine devoted to science fiction, originally published as Astounding Stories of Super-Science in 1930. Campbell's tenure at Astounding is considered to be the beginning of the Golden Age of science fiction, as he helped shift the focus away from pulpy adventure stories, to those characterized by hard science fiction stories celebrating scientific achievement and progress.

=== Modernist writing ===
Writers attempted to respond to the new world in the post-World War I era. In the 1920s and 30s writers entirely unconnected with science fiction were exploring new ways of telling a story and new ways of treating time, space and experience in the narrative form. The posthumously published works of Franz Kafka (who died in 1924) and the works of modernist writers such as James Joyce, T. S. Eliot, Virginia Woolf and others featured stories in which time and individual identity could be expanded, contracted, looped and otherwise distorted. While this work was unconnected to science fiction as a genre, it did deal with the impact of modernity (technology, science, and change) upon people's lives, and decades later, during the New Wave movement, some modernist literary techniques entered science fiction.

Czech playwright Karel Čapek's plays The Makropulos Affair, R.U.R., The Life of the Insects, and the novel War with the Newts were modernist literature which invented important science fiction motifs. R.U.R. in particular is noted for introducing the word robot to the world's vocabulary.

A strong theme in modernist writing was alienation, the making strange of familiar surroundings so that settings and behaviour usually regarded as "normal" are seen as though they were the seemingly bizarre practices of an alien culture. The audience of modernist plays or the readership of modern novels is often led to question everything.

At the same time, a tradition of more literary science fiction novels, treating with a dissonance between perceived Utopian conditions and the full expression of human desires, began to develop: the dystopian novel. For some time, the science fictional elements of these works were ignored by mainstream literary critics, though they owe a much greater debt to the science fiction genre than the modernists do. Sincerely Utopian writing, including much of Wells, has also deeply influenced science fiction, beginning with Hugo Gernsback's Ralph 124C 41+. Yevgeny Zamyatin's 1920 novel We depicts a totalitarian attempt to create a utopia that results in a dystopic state where free will is lost. Aldous Huxley bridged the gap between the literary establishment and the world of science fiction with Brave New World (1932), an ironic portrait of a stable and ostensibly happy society built by human mastery of genetic manipulation.

George Orwell wrote perhaps the most highly regarded of these literary dystopias, Nineteen Eighty-Four, in 1948. He envisions a technologically governed totalitarian regime that dominates society through total information control. Zamyatin's We is recognized as an influence on both Huxley and Orwell; Orwell published a book review of We shortly after it was first published in English, several years before writing 1984.

Ray Bradbury's Fahrenheit 451, Ursula K. Le Guin's The Dispossessed:An Ambiguous Utopia, much of Kurt Vonnegut's writing, and many other works of later science fiction continue this dialogue between utopia and dystopia.

=== Science fiction's impact on the public ===
Orson Welles's Mercury Theatre produced a radio version of The War of the Worlds which, according to urban myth, panicked large numbers of people who believed the program to be a real newscast. However, there is doubt as to how much anecdotes of mass panic had any reflection in reality, and the myth may have originated among newspapers, jealous of the upstart new medium of radio. Inarguably, though, the idea of visitors or invaders from outer space became embedded in the consciousness of everyday people.

During World War II, American military planners studied science fiction for ideas. The British did the same, and also asked authors to submit outlandish ideas which the government leaked to the Axis as real plans. Pilots speculated as to the origins of the "Foo fighters" they saw around them in the air. Meanwhile, the Germans had developed flying bombs known as V1s and V2s reminiscent of the "rocket ships" ever-present in pulp science fiction, presaging space flight. Jet planes and the atom bomb were developed. "Deadline", a Cleve Cartmill short story about a fictional atomic bomb project, prompted the FBI to visit the offices of Astounding Science Fiction.

Asimov said that "The dropping of the atom bomb in 1945 made science fiction respectable. Once the horror at Hiroshima took place, anyone could see that science fiction writers were not merely dreamers and crackpots after all, and that many of the motifs of that class of literature were now permanently part of the newspaper headlines". With the story of a flying saucer crash in Roswell, New Mexico in 1947, science fiction had become modern folklore.

== The Golden Age ==
The period of the 1940s and 1950s is often referred to as the Golden Age of Science Fiction.

=== Astounding Magazine ===
With the emergence in 1937 of a demanding editor, John W. Campbell, Jr., at Astounding Science Fiction, and with the publication of stories and novels by such writers as Isaac Asimov, Arthur C. Clarke, and Robert A. Heinlein, science fiction began to gain status as serious fiction.

Campbell exercised an extraordinary influence over the work of his stable of writers, thus shaping the direction of science fiction. Asimov wrote, "We were extensions of himself; we were his literary clones." Under Campbell's direction, the years from 1938–1950 would become known as the "Golden Age of science fiction", though Asimov points out that the term Golden Age has been used more loosely to refer to other periods in science fiction's history.

Campbell's guidance to his writers included his famous dictum, "Write me a creature that thinks as well as a man, or better than a man, but not like a man." He emphasized a higher quality of writing than editors before him, giving special attention to developing the group of young writers who attached themselves to him.

Ventures into the genre by writers who were not devoted exclusively to science fiction also added respectability. Magazine covers of bug-eyed monsters and scantily clad women, however, preserved the image of a sensational genre appealing only to adolescents. There was a public desire for sensation, a desire of people to be taken out of their dull lives to the worlds of space travel and adventure.

An interesting footnote to Campbell's regime is his contribution to the rise of L. Ron Hubbard's religion Scientology. Hubbard was considered a promising science fiction writer and a protégé of Campbell, who published Hubbard's first articles about Dianetics and his new religion. As Campbell's reign as editor of Astounding progressed, Campbell gave more attention to ideas like Hubbard's, writing editorials in support of Dianetics. Though Astounding continued to have a loyal fanbase, readers started turning to other magazines to find science fiction stories.

=== The Golden Age in other media ===
With the new source material provided by the Golden Age writers, advances in special effects, and a public desire for material that treated with the advances in technology of the time, all the elements were in place to create significant works of science fiction film.

As a result, science fiction film came into its own in the 1950s, producing films like Destination Moon, Them!, Invasion of the Body Snatchers, Forbidden Planet, and many others. Many of these movies were based on stories by Campbell's writers. The Thing from Another World was adapted from a Campbell story, Them and Invasion of the Body Snatchers were based on Jack Finney novels, Destination Moon on a Heinlein novel, and The Beast from 20,000 Fathoms was derived from a Ray Bradbury short story. John Wyndham's cosy catastrophes, including The Day of the Triffids and The Kraken Wakes, provided important source material as well.

Science fiction had also been appearing in American comic books such as Planet Comics, but an important step forward came with the anthology series Weird Science and Weird Fantasy, published by EC Comics, which would include some adaptations from authors like Ray Bradbury, along with many original stories. Classics Illustrated had already published adaptations of Wells and Verne stories.

At the same time, science fiction began to appear on a new medium – television. In 1953 The Quatermass Experiment was shown on British television, the first significant science fiction show, though it could also be described as horror. In the United States, science fiction heroes like Captain Video, Flash Gordon and Buck Rogers were shown, programs that more closely resembled pre-Campbellian science fiction. These shows also saw comic book spin-off products.

=== End of the Golden Age ===
Seeking greater freedom of expression, writers started to publish their articles in other magazines, including The Magazine of Fantasy and Science Fiction, If magazine, a resurrected Amazing Stories, and most notably, Galaxy.

Under editors H.L. Gold and then Frederik Pohl, Galaxy stressed a more literary form of science fiction that took cues from more mainstream literature. It was less insistent on scientific plausibility than Campbell's Astounding. The rise of Galaxy signaled the end of Golden Age science fiction, though most of the Golden Age writers were able to adapt to the changes in the genre and keep writing. Some, however, moved to other fields. Isaac Asimov and several others began to write scientific fact almost exclusively.

== The New Wave and its aftermath ==
=== Mainstream publishers ===
Until about 1950, magazines were the only way authors could publish new stories. Only small specialty presses like Arkham House and Gnome Press published science fiction hardcover books, all reprints of magazine stories. With rare exceptions like the collections Adventures in Time and Space and A Treasury of Science Fiction, large mainstream publishers only printed Verne and Wells. Most genre books were sold by mail from small magazine advertisements, because bookstores rarely carried science fiction.

By 1951, the small presses proved that demand existed for science fiction books, enough to cause magazines to print regular review columns. Large, mainstream companies published hardboiled crime fiction during World War II; Doubleday in 1950, then Simon & Schuster, Scribner's, Putnam, and others now entered the science fiction market. They issued fixups such as The Martian Chronicles, novel versions of serialized stories, and original fiction. Demand for content grew as the specialty presses had depleted the supply of easily reprinted, high-quality stories; new genre magazines appeared (38 different science fiction publications existed in the US and UK in 1953); and large-circulation magazines like Playboy, Collier's, and Esquire published stories. Genre stories like Walter M. Miller Jr.'s A Canticle for Leibowitz became mainstream bestsellers as books. For the first time, an author could write science fiction full-time; Barry N. Malzberg calculated that producing 1,000 words a day would earn twice the national median income, and Asimov stopped teaching at Boston University School of Medicine after making more money as a writer.

The mainstream book companies' large print runs and distribution networks lowered prices and increased availability, but displaced the small publishers; Algis Budrys later said that "they themselves would draw little but disaster" from the science fiction boom of the 1950s they helped to begin. While book sales continued to grow, the magazine industry almost collapsed from the glut of new titles, shrinking from 23 in mid-1957 to six by the end of 1960, while authors like Heinlein, Clarke, Vonnegut, and Bradbury published through non-genre publications that paid at much higher rates. Top writers like Budrys, Miller, Theodore Sturgeon, and Robert Silverberg left the industry.

=== Precursors to the New Wave ===
Samuel Beckett's The Unnamable and Waiting for Godot were influential upon writing in the 1950s. In the former all sense of place and time are dispensed with; all that remains is a voice poised between the urge to continue existing and the urge to find silence and oblivion. (The only other major writer to use "The Unnamable" as a title was H. P. Lovecraft.) In the latter, time and the paradoxes of cause and effect become thematic. Beckett's influence on the intelligentsia—as well as the general influence of existentialism and the legal battles to publish books then classified as obscene—made science fiction more sophisticated, especially in Britain.

William S. Burroughs (1914–1997) was the writer who finally brought science fiction together with the trends of postmodern literature. With the help of Jack Kerouac, Burroughs published Naked Lunch, the first of a series of novels employing a semi-dadaistic technique called the Cut-up and postmodern deconstructions of conventional society, pulling away the mask of normality to reveal nothingness beneath. Burroughs showed visions of society as a conspiracy of aliens, monsters, police states, drug dealers and alternate levels of reality. The linguistics of science fiction merged with the experiments of postmodernism in a beat generation gestalt.

=== The New Wave ===
In 1960, British novelist Kingsley Amis published New Maps of Hell, a literary history and examination of the field of science fiction based on a series of lectures he delivered at Princeton University. The book became an influential contribution to the developing field of science fiction criticism.

Another milestone was the publication, in 1965, of Frank Herbert's Dune, a complex work of fiction featuring political intrigue in a future galaxy, mystical religious beliefs, and the ecosystem of the desert planet Arrakis. Writing in The Oxford History of the Novel in English, Edward James describes Dune as "arguably the most significant US science fiction novel of the second half of the twentieth century", as well as the first tmodern science fiction novel to achieve "breakthrough" to the mainstream.

Another was the emergence of the work of Roger Zelazny, whose novels such as Lord of Light and his famous The Chronicles of Amber showed that the lines between science-fiction, fantasy, religion, and social commentary could be very fine.

Also in 1965 French director Jean-Luc Godard's film Alphaville used the medium of dystopian and apocalyptic science fiction to explore language and society.

In Britain, the 1960s generation of writers, dubbed "The New Wave", were experimenting with different forms of science fiction, stretching the genre towards surrealism, psychological drama and mainstream currents. The 60s New Wave was centered around the writing in the magazine New Worlds after Michael Moorcock assumed editorial control in 1963. William Burroughs was a big influence. The writers of the New Wave also believed themselves to be building on the legacy of the French New Wave artistic movement. Though the New Wave was largely a British movement, there were parallel developments taking place in American science fiction at the same time. The relation of the British New Wave to American science fiction was made clear by Harlan Ellison's original anthology Dangerous Visions, which presented science fiction writers, both American and British, writing stories that pushed the boundaries of what was acceptable in a science fiction magazine. Isaac Asimov, writing an introduction to the anthology, labeled it the Second Revolution, after the first revolution that produced the Golden Age.

The New Wave and their contemporaries placed a greater emphasis on style and a more highbrow form of storytelling. They also sought controversy in subjects older science fiction writers had avoided. For the first time sexuality, which Kingsley Amis had complained was nearly ignored in science fiction, was given serious consideration by writers like Samuel R. Delany, Ursula K. Le Guin, Norman Spinrad, and Theodore Sturgeon. Contemporary political issues were also given a voice, as John Brunner and J. G. Ballard wrote cautionary tales about, respectively, overpopulation and apocalypse.

Asimov noted that the Second Revolution was far less clear cut than the first, attributing this to the development of the anthology, which made older stories more prominent. But a number of Golden Age writers changed their style as the New Wave hit. Robert A. Heinlein switched from his Campbellian Future History stories to stylistically adventuresome, sexually open works of fiction, notably Stranger in a Strange Land and The Moon Is a Harsh Mistress. Isaac Asimov wrote the New Wave-ish The Gods Themselves. Many others also continued successfully as styles changed.

Science fiction films took inspiration from the changes in the genre. Stanley Kubrick's 2001: A Space Odyssey and A Clockwork Orange gave visual form to the genre's new style. A myriad of other films, including THX 1138 and Soylent Green, depicted a dystopian future.

Ursula K. Le Guin extrapolated social and biological changes that were anthropological in nature. Philip K. Dick explored the metaphysics of the mind in a series of novels and stories that rarely seemed dependent on their science fictional content. Le Guin, Dick, and others like them became associated with the concept of soft science fiction more than with the New Wave.

Soft science fiction was contrasted to the notion of hard science fiction. Though scientific plausibility had been a central tenet of the genre since Gernsback, writers like Larry Niven and Poul Anderson gave hard science fiction new life, crafting stories with a more sophisticated writing style and more deeply characterized protagonists, while preserving a high level of scientific sophistication.

== Science fiction in the 1980s ==
=== Cyberpunk ===
By the early 1980s the fantasy market was much larger than that of almost all science fiction authors. The New Wave had faded out as an important presence in the science fiction landscape. As new personal computing technologies became an integral part of society, science fiction writers felt the urge to make statements about its influence on the cultural and political landscape. Drawing on the work of the New Wave, the Cyberpunk movement developed in the early 80s. Though it placed the same influence on style that the New Wave did, it developed its own unique style, typically focusing on the 'punks' of their imagined future underworld. Cyberpunk authors like William Gibson turned away from the traditional optimism and support for progress of traditional science fiction. William Gibson's Neuromancer, published in 1984, announced the cyberpunk movement to the larger literary world and was a tremendous commercial success. Other key writers in the movement included Bruce Sterling, John Shirley, and later Neal Stephenson. Though Cyberpunk would later be cross-pollinated with other styles of science fiction, there seemed to be some notion of ideological purity in the beginning. John Shirley compared the Cyberpunk movement to a tribe.

During the 1980s, a large number of cyberpunk manga and anime works were produced in Japan, the most notable being the 1982 manga Akira and its 1988 anime film adaptation, the 1985 anime Megazone 23, and the 1989 manga Ghost in the Shell which was also adapted into an anime film in 1995.

== Contemporary science fiction and its future ==
Contemporary science fiction has been marked by the spread of cyberpunk to other parts of the marketplace of ideas. No longer is cyberpunk a ghettoized tribe within science fiction, but an integral part of the field whose interactions with other parts have been the primary theme of science fiction around the start of the 21st century.

Notably, cyberpunk has influenced film, in works such as Johnny Mnemonic and The Matrix series, in anime such as Akira and Ghost in the Shell, and the emerging medium of video games, with the critically acclaimed Deus Ex and Metal Gear series. This entrance of cyberpunk into mainstream culture has led to the introduction of cyberpunk's stylistic motifs to the masses, particularly the cyberpunk fashion style. It has also led to other developments including Steampunk (a subgenre of science fiction and fantasy that incorporates technology and aesthetic designs inspired by 19th-century industrial steam-powered machinery) and Dieselpunk (which combines the aesthetics of the diesel-based technology of the interwar period through to the 1950s with retro-futuristic technology and postmodern sensibilities).

Emerging themes in the 1990s included environmental issues, the implications of the global Internet and the expanding information universe, questions about biotechnology and nanotechnology, as well as a post-Cold War interest in post-scarcity societies; Neal Stephenson's The Diamond Age comprehensively explores these themes. Lois McMaster Bujold's Vorkosigan novels brought the character-driven story back into prominence.

The cyberpunk reliance on near-future science fiction has deepened. In William Gibson's 2003 novel, Pattern Recognition, the story is a cyberpunk story told in the present, the ultimate limit of the near-future extrapolation.

Cyberpunk's ideas have spread in other directions, though. Space opera writers have written work featuring cyberpunk motifs, including David Brin's Kiln People and Ken MacLeod's Fall Revolution series. This merging of the two disparate threads of science fiction in the 1980s has produced an extrapolational literature in contrast to those technological stories told in the present.

John Clute writes that science fiction around the start of the 21st century can be understood in two ways: "a vision of the triumph of science fiction as a genre and as a series of outstanding texts which figured to our gaze the significant futures that, during those years, came to pass ... [or]... indecipherable from the world during those years ... fatally indistinguishable from the world it attempted to adumbrate, to signify."

== See also ==
- History of interstellar space
- History of science fiction films
- List of science fiction visual artists (redirect from "Science fiction art")
- Russian science fiction and fantasy which is arranged by chronological sections
- Science fiction fandom (section "Origins and history")
- Science fiction film (section "History")
- Science fiction in China which is arranged by chronological sections
- Science fiction magazine (section "History of science fiction magazines")
- Serbian science fiction (section "History")
- Speculative fiction (section "History")
- Timeline of science fiction
