= Małe zielone ludziki =

Science fiction novel by Krzysztof Boruń

- Author: Krzysztof Boruń
- Language: Polish
- Genre: Science fiction
- Publisher: Krajowa Agencja Wydawnicza
- Publication date: 1985
- Publication place: Poland
- Media type: Print
- OCLC: 1150607558

Małe zielone ludziki (Little Green Men) is a science fiction novel by Krzysztof Boruń, first published in 1985 (Note: However, a review of the book appeared in "Fantastyka" three years earlier, in 1982, with the reviewer describing the book as published by KAW in 1982. However, no library has an edition from that year; the 1985 edition is described as the 1st Edition.) by Krajowa Agencja Wydawnicza (in two volumes) in the series Fantazja–Przygoda–Rozrywka (Fantasy–Adventure–Entertainment). It is classified as social and political science fiction and described as a dystopia.

Set in a dystopian, racist, and technologically advanced African nation, the story follows a Polish female protagonist as she navigates the chaos caused by a mysterious vortex known as Vortex P that emerged on that continent. The novel explores themes of power, totalitarianism, ecological threats, and colonialism, critiquing the sociopolitical dynamics of its fictional setting and reflecting Cold War-era Polish perceptions of Africa. Despite being ambitious, the novel has been criticized for its convoluted plot, verbose dialogue, and underdeveloped characters.

== Publication history ==
The novel was written between 1978 and 1980. It was first published in 1985 by Krajowa Agencja Wydawnicza (in two volumes) as part of the series Fantazja–Przygoda–Rozrywka (Fantasy–Adventure–Entertainment). In 2014, the book was released as an e-book. In 2019, it was reissued by Stalker Books.

== Plot ==
In the fictional, racist, and technologically advanced African country of Duskland (where the ruling white population is developing laser weapons and planning to conquer the world to subjugate "colored races"), a mysterious vortex called Vortex P appears, causing hallucinations and distorting the psyche of those near the phenomenon. The protagonist is Agnieszka Radej, a Polish student and émigré, who is an activist of a radical pro-ecological organization (considered by some to be terrorist). The vortex, which science cannot explain, is being exploited by local partisans fighting against the white colonizers. The organization she is a member of is trying to free its members held in Duskland, but their plan begins to unravel due to the effects of Vortex P.

== Reception ==
Already in 1982, the book was reviewed by Andrzej Niewiadomski for "Fantastyka". The reviewer assessed the book very positively, writing that it would very likely "enter the group of works that form the forefront of Polish post-war science fiction". He praised the "lively, exciting action, full of various twists" (which, however, sometimes distracts from more serious issues), coherent plot, interesting descriptions of society and successful construction of the novel.

In 1986, Jan Lewandowski reviewed the book for "Tygodnik Kulturalny", judging it "particularly valuable... revealing Boruń's talent in its entirety after [years]." He found the novel highly original, outside of the motif of human control by technology, already tackled by many earlier science fiction works. He also praised the author's knowledge of social science, especially applied science. He expressed regret that classifying the novel as science fiction "relegates the book to areas beyond the scope of 'serious' criticism".

In 2014, the book was reviewed for Esensja by Konrad Wągrowski and Miłosz Cybowski; both gave it a score of "60%". The book was praised by Wągrowski for tackling enduring themes and its ambitious scope, though Wągrowski observed that this ambition might be excessive. He suggested that the central message becomes obscured by the abundance of narrative threads and characters, making it challenging for readers to follow, and noted dissatisfaction with the conclusion. Additionally, he pointed out the presence of overly long, declarative passages where opinions are conveyed through extended monologues. Similarly, Cybowski characterized the book as both nostalgic and ambitious but found it more flawed than successful, weighed down by dense and verbose dialogue, the unnecessary inclusion of unresolved plotlines, and the author's lack of focus on a primary narrative thread, which he argued left the story feeling directionless.

Jarosław Loretz reviewed the book for Esensja in 2016. He criticized many elements of the novel, which, at about 600 pages, he considered long and described as a "classic example of ambition outstripping writing ability". He was especially critical of the underdeveloped thriller aspect, which was overshadowed by "verbose, insanely boring dissertations" and the psychology of the characters. He described the main protagonist as not very feminine, naïve, with "murky motivations [and] peculiar reactions", and criticized the ending as unsatisfying, and never revealing the true nature of Vortex P.

== Analysis ==
The work is classified as social and political science fiction. It has also been described as a dystopia and sensation novel. According to Andrzej Niewiadowski and Antoni Smuszkiewicz, authors of Leksykon polskiej literatury fantastycznonaukowej (1990), the book touches on themes such as "a civilization controlled by psychotropic substances and the issue of ecological threats". In his earlier review, Niewiadomski noted that the book uses the motif of a "miraculous invention", but does so in a critical way, looking at how irresponsible individuals or groups can unethically use powerful psychotropic substances to control society. He considered the description of the behavior of various groups affected by the Vortex to be one of the "most interesting aspects of the novel". He also noted the theme of first contact with aliens in the bookIn 2014, Cybowski noted that the main themes of the novel are related to "power, totalitarianism, and control over society".

In Fantastyka socjologiczna: poetyka i myślenie utopijne (2008), Mariusz Maciej Leś wrote that "Boruń's novel is an example of combining investigation and intrigue, with the former predominating". He observed that the thriller thread quickly takes a back seat, and the book becomes a philosophical "sequence of simulated discussions, masked lectures [where] paranoid knowledge takes the form of scenarios multiplying uncontrollably" (regarding the origin and control of Vortex P, according to various theories, responsibility lies with aliens, demons, corporations, scientists, Western countries (in particular, the CIA), communist countries, Islamic forces, and local authorities and their guerrilla opponents). In its focus on a multitude of hypotheses and explanations he saw a similarity between this novel and Solaris by Stanisław Lem. He was not impressed by the protagonist, stating that she is overwhelmed by the plot, and her contribution is limited to simply repeating and rephrasing theories presented to her by others. Leś concluded that the main messages of the book are that control and power are aided by technological means (in particular, informatization), and that the most powerful and successful entities "never reveal their strategy, act in a roundabout, indirect way, most often secretly controlling the course of events so that they appear spontaneous".

According to Dariusz Brzostek, writing in Przegląd Kulturoznawczy in 2021, the novel contains the most detailed futuristic depiction of Africa in Polish science fiction of the Polish People's Republic era. The country depicted in the book is largely inspired by South Africa – it is technologically advanced but racist, dominated by whites who exploit the local black population. The book critiques colonialism, but nonetheless "hope for Africa" comes from external factors – the mysterious vortex, as well as activists from anti-colonial movements and socialist-communist European countries. In this context, the book reflects how Africa was perceived in Poland during that period – supporting African countries' struggles for independence while simultaneously viewing Africa as underdeveloped and criticizing Western nations responsible for its colonization, suggesting that socialist-communist countries were friendlier towards Africa.
