= Invention story =

Literary motif in science fiction

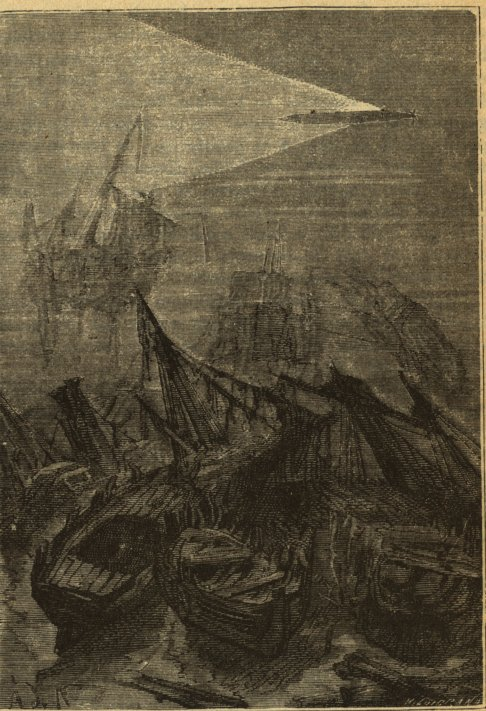
The submarine Nautilus from Jules Verne's Twenty Thousand Leagues Under the Seas, illustrated by Alphonse de Neuville

An invention story (also called invention fiction, gadget story or gadget fiction) is a type of science fiction in which an extraordinary invention or scientific discovery forms the central motif of the plot. Particularly prominent in the early history of science fiction, the invention story often depicts the introduction of a novel technology into an otherwise familiar world and explores its applications or consequences.

The invention itself, known in literary scholarship as a miraculous invention, may also appear as a subsidiary motif in works concerned primarily with other subjects.

== Characteristics ==
The invention story has been discussed by Peter Nicholls and David Langford in The Encyclopedia of Science Fiction and by Farah Mendlesohn, who regards it and the related scientific mystery as foundational forms of modern science fiction. In Brave New Words: The Oxford Dictionary of Science Fiction (2007), Jeff Prucher defines gadget in this context as describing fiction centred on an invention, particularly when characterization is secondary to technology. In Polish literary scholarship, Antoni Smuszkiewicz and Adam Mazurkiewicz have discussed the corresponding motif under the term cudowny wynalazek (which translates as miraculous invention).

According to Smuszkiewicz, a conventional invention story initially establishes a setting consistent with realist literature. The introduction of an extraordinary invention transforms this otherwise ordinary setting into a fantastic one. This narrative structure resembles that of some horror fiction, but the invention is presented as the product of scientific or pseudoscientific reasoning rather than supernatural forces. Its extraordinary properties are explained as the result of discovering or applying previously unknown possibilities within the laws of nature.

Smuszkiewicz distinguishes between works in which the invention is the principal subject and those in which it serves other narrative purposes, such as establishing the technological setting of a future society. Richard L. McKinney makes a similar distinction in The Greenwood Encyclopedia of Science Fiction and Fantasy (2005), observing that many works feature fictional innovations without investigating their origins or wider implications. Examples include the transporters, replicators and holodecks of the Star Trek franchise.

The solitary genius, sometimes depicted as a mad scientist, is a recurring character in early invention stories. Mendlesohn notes that in the science fiction of the 1930s and 1940s, inventions were typically conceived for a particular purpose, with relatively little attention paid to their unforeseen consequences for society. Many stories ended with the destruction of the invention and the death of its creator. She associates the prevalence of the lone inventor with the public image cultivated by Thomas Edison and the influence of the great man theory of history.

The invention at the centre of a story need not be a mechanical device; it may be a new substance, medical procedure, technological process or method of modifying living organisms. Such stories can serve as thought experiments, examining intended and unintended effects of technological innovation and the social and ethical issues arising from it.

A related type of story concerns the discovery and attempted exploitation of extraterrestrial technology. Examples include Roadside Picnic (1972) by Arkady and Boris Strugatsky, Rendezvous with Rama (1973) by Arthur C. Clarke and Gateway (1977) by Frederik Pohl. A significant theme in these works is the inability of humans to fully comprehend the technology they encounter.

== History ==
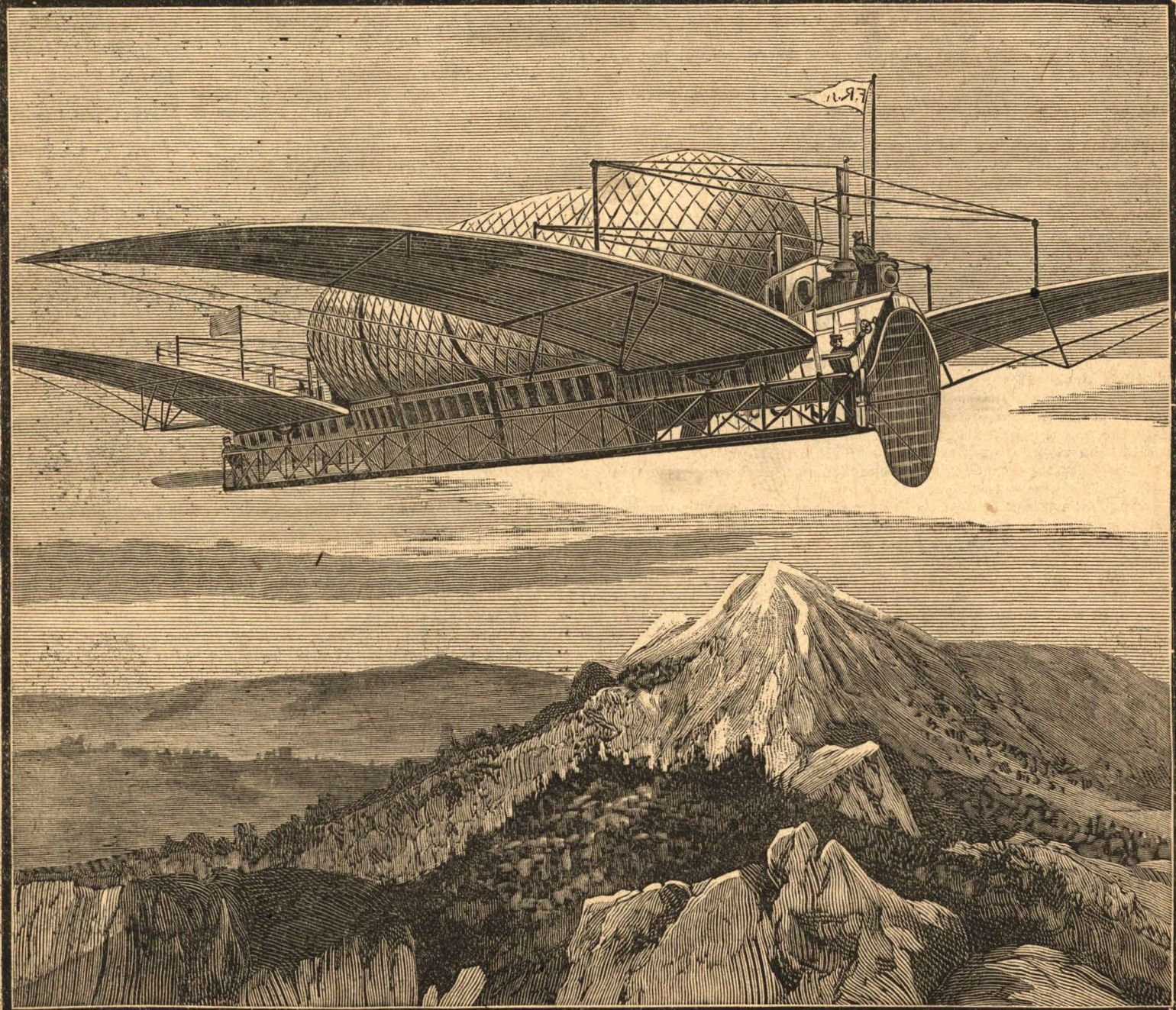
An imaginary flying machine on the cover of Over the Andes with Frank Reade Jr. in His New Air-Ship (1894), an example of the edisonade

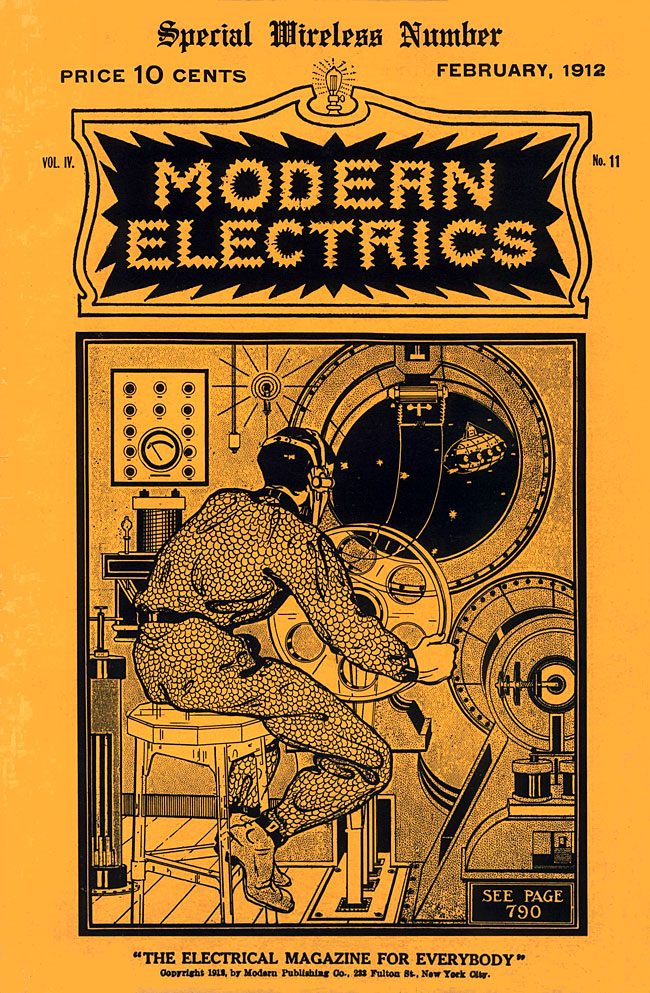
February 1912 issue of Modern Electrics, featuring an illustration for Hugo Gernsback's serialized novel Ralph 124C 41+

Mazurkiewicz traces the roots of the invention story in part to earlier legends about alchemists seeking the philosopher's stone. He interprets nineteenth-century tales of extraordinary inventions as a reinterpretation of this older motif in the spirit of scientism. Their development was also associated with the fascination with science and technology during the era of positivism and with a literary tradition popularized by Mary Shelley's Frankenstein (1818).

The invention story flourished in the latter half of the nineteenth century, notably in the works of Jules Verne and his followers. Enduring examples of early fictional inventions include Verne's submarine, the Nautilus, in Twenty Thousand Leagues Under the Seas (1870), and the time-travelling device and scientific method of achieving invisibility in H. G. Wells's The Time Machine (1895) and The Invisible Man (1897), respectively.

In the United States, invention stories became popular in dime novels, including adventure series about young inventors. A particular form of this fiction is the edisonade, named after Edison, whose inventor heroes overcome adversity with the aid of their technological ingenuity, often saving their communities or countries.

In the early twentieth century, invention stories became a staple of pulp magazines, alongside stories of future warfare and lost civilizations. Hugo Gernsback, who published Science and Invention before founding Amazing Stories, helped popularize them. His novel Ralph 124C 41+ (serialized in 1911–1912) surveyed a range of imagined future technologies (including television).

An increasingly pessimistic view of technology developed in some invention stories, reinforced by the advent of nuclear weapons. Nevertheless, the genre continued to flourish in John W. Campbell's Astounding Science Fiction, with examples such as Robert A. Heinlein's "Waldo" (1942) and George O. Smith's Venus Equilateral series. Inventions also provided material for humorous science fiction, including the stories by Henry Kuttner collected in Robots Have No Tails (1952).

Later science fiction continued to explore the implications of technological discoveries. Examples include Kurt Vonnegut's Cat's Cradle (1963), Isaac Asimov's The Gods Themselves (1972) and Bob Shaw's fiction about slow glass, including "Light of Other Days" (1966; delveped into Other Days, Other Eyes, 1972), in which glass allows past events to be viewed after a delay. A later example of an optimistic invention story is Arthur C. Clarke's The Fountains of Paradise (1979), which depicts the construction of a space elevator.

Extraordinary inventions also appear in fiction outside the narrowly understood science fiction genre, including spy fiction and techno-thrillers. The James Bond novels and films, for instance, often feature unusual gadgets used both by Bond and by his antagonists.

== In Polish literature ==
Early Polish examples of the invention motif include Teodor Tripplin's Podróż po Księżycu ('Journey on the Moon') and Bolesław Prus's unfinished Sława ('Fame'). The motif subsequently became prominent in the writings of Władysław Umiński. Umiński's science fiction, such as Balonem do bieguna ('By Balloon to the Pole', 1894 book edition) or W nieznane światy ('Into Unknown Worlds', 1895) aimed to educate young readers and popularize science. Umiński's futuristic devices were generally improvements on existing technologies, such as submarines, aircraft and balloons; a recurring plot device in his works was the failure of an extraordinary machine, such as the aircraft in Samolotem naokoło świata ('Around the World in an Airplane', 1911) () or the submarine in W głębinach oceanu ('In the Depths of the Ocean', 1920). Its repair provided the protagonists with an opportunity to demonstrate their technical skill and resourcefulness. Antoni Lange explored the theme of restoring youth, which recalled earlier alchemical legends, in stories including "Nowy Tarzan" (1925). Others authors who employed the invention motif this period included Bruno Winawer, Stefan Barszczewski and Jan Karczewski.

After World War II, particularly during the period of socialist realism, the extraordinary invention was also used for ideological purposes. Inventions provided a means of dramatizing the opposition between capitalism and socialism, with the harmful exploitation of technology frequently associated with capitalist interests. Works discussed by Mazurkiewicz in this context include Stanisław Lem's The Magellanic Cloud (1955), Krzysztof Boruń and Andrzej Trepka's Zagubiona przyszłość ('Lost Future', 1954), and Witold Zegalski's Krater czarnego snu ('Crater of the Black Dream', 1960).

Mazurkiewicz identifies three developments in Polish invention fiction after 1960: the depiction of scientific discoveries as potential threats to society; the use of seemingly extraordinary inventions that ultimately prove to be hoaxes; and the incorporation of extraordinary technologies into fictional worlds as ordinary pieces of equipment rather than central motifs. Examples of the first tendency include the betrization procedure in Lem's Return from the Stars (1961) and the cybernetic microorganisms in his Observation on the Spot (1982).

By the late 1960s and early 1970s, Polish authors had largely moved away from the traditional invention story, a development associated in part with the rise of social science fiction. Extraordinary technological devices increasingly served to establish the setting rather than to provide the principal subject of a narrative.

== See also ==
- Fictional technology
- Hypothetical technology
- Magical item
- Novum
- Sense of wonder
- Thought experiment
