= Candor (novel) =

2009 novel by Pam Bachorz

- Author: Pam Bachorz
- Publication date: 2009

Candor is a 2009 young adult science fiction novel by Pam Bachorz, tackling the theme of mind control.

== Plot ==
Set in the near future, uses a trope common to horror in speculative fiction, that of a small town "malevolently under some kind of mesmeric or unholy control". A review in Wired magazine described the book's fictional setting as one that would produce "Stepford children", children brainwashed into conformity via subliminal messages. Its protagonist is Oscar Banks, whose father founded the town, and operates its system of indoctrination. Banks pretends to be a conformist, while covertly helping residents escape. Banks encounters a new girl in town, Nia, who has a strikingly different personality, forcing him to decide whether to keep her in town to alleviate his boredom, or help her also leave.

== Reception ==
A review of the volume by Publishers Weekly called some aspects of the premise "difficult to swallow", but was positive overall, calling it a compelling story. The Wired review similarly praised Bachorz's ability to keep the plot moving and build suspense, though it described the book as "not terribly deep", and with a larger quotient of romance than expected. An essay in The ALAN Review commented on the varying motivations of the adults in the town; for Oscar Banks's father, brainwashing the children represents an opportunity for wealth, while for the parents, it is the idea of a "perfect family". The book references several works of fiction that feature propaganda or psychological control, including Nineteen Eighty-Four and The Clockwork Orange, while its ending was described as resembling that of One Flew Over the Cuckoo's Nest, which also explores psychological control.

== Awards and honors ==
Year	Title	Award	Result	Ref.
2009	Candor	ALA Best Books for Young Adults	Nominee	
2009	Candor	Cybils Award for Young Adult Speculative Fiction	Finalist	
2011	Candor	Popular Paperbacks for Young Adults	Selection	
2011	Candor	YALSA Teens' Top Ten	Nominee	
