= The Consolidator =

1705 book

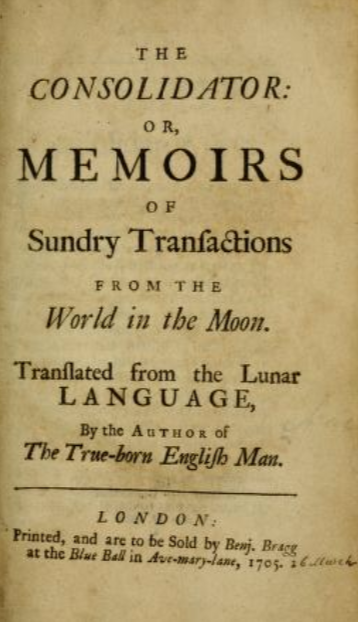
- Title page for The Consolidator; or, Memoirs of Sundry Transactions from the World in the Moon (1705)
- Author: Daniel Defoe
- Original title: The Consolidator or, Memoirs of Sundry Transactions from the World in the Moon
- Language: English
- Genre: Science fiction
- Publisher: W. Taylor
- Publication date: 1705
- Publication place: England

The Consolidator; or, Memoirs of Sundry Transactions from the World in the Moon is a fictional adventure by Daniel Defoe published in 1705. It is a satirical novel that mixes fantasy, political satire, and social satire.

== Plot summary ==
The narrator travels to the Moon through the means of the titular "consolidator" – a chariot with two feathered winged creatures.

== Analysis ==
The novel is a political satire of the British politics and society of Defoe's era. For example, each of the chariot's winged steeds represents one of the houses of the Parliament of England.

The chariot has also been described as one of the earliest spaceships (or airships) in known fiction. This, in addition to its portrayal of the Moon and the concept of space flight, has resulted in the work being classified as proto-science fiction.
