= Novum =

"new thing" in a science fiction story

Novum (Latin, 'new thing') is a term used by science fiction scholar Darko Suvin and others to describe the scientifically plausible innovations used by science fiction narratives.

Frequently used science fictional nova include aliens, time travel, the technological singularity, artificial intelligence, and psychic powers. It can cover an extension of a current trend, such as population growth, as in the movie Soylent Green where the world is overpopulated to an extreme extent and the story shows the consequences of this.

== Origin ==
Suvin learned the term from Ernst Bloch, whose work is cited frequently in Metamorphoses of Science Fiction.

Suvin argues that the genre of science fiction is distinguished from fantasy by the story being driven by a novum validated by logic he calls cognitive estrangement. This means that the hypothetical "new thing" which the story is about can be imagined to exist by scientific means rather than by magic, i.e., by the factual reporting of fictions and by relating them in a plausible way to reality.

== See also ==
- Invention story
- The dictionary definition of novum at Wiktionary

== General references ==
- Cambridge Companion to Science Fiction
- Metamorphoses of Science Fiction: On the Poetics and History of a Literary Genre by Darko Suvin. 1979.
