= Krzysztof Boruń =

Polish physicist and author (1923-2000)

- Born: 23 November 1923; Częstochowa, Poland
- Died: 22 May 2000 (aged 76); Warsaw, Poland
- Occupations: Writer, Physics teacher, Journalist
- Spouse: Maria Staszewska Boruń
- Writing career
- Period: 1953–2000
- Genre: Science fiction (hard SF)
- Subjects: Popular science, science textbooks, essays, psychology, astronomy, astronautics
- Notable work: The Zagubiona przyszłość Series

Krzysztof Boruń (23 November 1923 – 22 May 2000) was a Polish physicist, journalist and science fiction writer. As an author of a number of essays, articles and novels, he was an important popularizer of science. By his contemporaries, Boruń was described as the "visionary of space travel"

== Biography ==
=== Early life and World War II ===
Krzysztof Boruń was born on 29 November 1923 in the Polish town of Częstochowa. Between 1943 and 1945, he worked as a teacher of physics and mathematics. During World War II he was a member of the Polish resistance movement Armia Krajowa and he took part in the Warsaw Uprising. During the uprising he fought as a crew member of the improvised armored car Kubuś.

=== Postwar era ===
After the war he would work as a journalist for the daily newspaper "Ilustrowany Kurier Polski" and the weekly "Tygodnik Demokratyczny".

Boruń became a member of the Polish Writers' Association. During his work as a journalist, he wrote articles mainly concerning the subjects of psychology, physics, sociology, astronomy, parapsychology, cybernetics and futurology.

He started his career as a science fiction writer in 1953 with the novel Zagubiona przyszłość (Polish: "Lost future"), co-authored with Andrzej Trepka. The novel was first printed as a series in the daily newspaper Ilustrowany Kurier Polski. Later in 1954 a somewhat revised version of the novel was published as a standalone hardcover edition. The success of Zagubiona przyszłość, sparked two follow-up novels Proxima and Kosmiczni bracia (Polish: "Space brothers") that together form a trilogy.

An active popularizer of science, he wrote articles for the astronautics and astronomy sections for the popular science periodical "Kto, Kiedy, Dlaczego" (Polish: "Who, When, Why"). His articles in the periodical expressed careful criticism of the Soviet space program, in particular the decision not to bring Laika, the first dog in space, safely back to earth.

Two of Boruń's novels written in the 1960s – Próg nieśmiertelności (Polish: "Edge of immortality") and Ósmy krąg piekieł (Polish: "8th circle of Hell") were first published in Russian and Ukrainian, they have not been published in Poland until the 1970s. His works have also been translated to Japanese, German, Czech, Hungarian languages.

Between 1982 and 1984 he was editor-in-chief of the periodicals Astronautyka and Postępy Astronautyki, both dedicated to astronautics and space research.

=== Personal beliefs ===
He was an atheist since the age of 12, but later in life he drifted towards agnosticism, arguing for the possibility of the existence of a God. In a number of publications he discussed matters of faith, parapsychology, religion, reincarnation and life after death. He remained open to multiple interpretations of reality, admitting that some events cannot be fully explained by contemporary science. Nevertheless, he remained convinced that further scientific discoveries will eventually provide all the answers to the issues that remain a mystery to his contemporaries.

== Selected bibliography ==
=== Novels ===
- Zagubiona przyszłość, (coauthor: Andrzej Trepka), (1954).
- Proxima, (coauthor: Andrzej Trepka), (1956).
- Kosmiczni bracia, (coauthor: Andrzej Trepka), (1959).
- Próg nieśmiertelności (1975).
- Ósmy krąg piekieł (1978).
- Małe zielone ludziki I & II (1985).
- Jasnowidzenia inżyniera Szarka (1990).

=== Short story collections ===
- Spadkobiercy (1958) - an anthology that included short stories by Boruń.
- Antyświat i inne opowiadania fantastyczno-naukowe (1960)
- Toccata (1980).
- Człowiek z mgły (1986).

=== Other publications ===
- Księżyc zdobyty (1956)
- Tajemnice parapsychologii, (coauthor: S. Manczarski), (1982)
- Mały słownik cybernetyczny (1973)
- Kto, kiedy, dlaczego? - (a popular science periodical, Boruń wrote for the astronautics section)
- Ossowiecki - zagadki jasnowidzenia, (coauthor: Katarzyna Boruń-Jagodzińska) (1990)
- W świecie zjaw i mediów. Spór o duchy (1996)
- Na krawędzi zaświatów. Sporu o duchy ciąg dalszy (1999)
