= Simon Tyssot de Patot =

French writer and poet

Simon Tyssot de Patot (1655–1738) was a French writer and poet during the Age of Enlightenment who penned two very important, seminal works in fantastic literature. Tyssot was born in London of French Huguenot parents. He was brought up in Rouans, moved to Delft (1662), Heusden (1676–1679) and Den Bosch, but spent most of his adult life in Deventer in the Netherlands, where he taught French and was professor of mathematics at the city's Athenaeum Illustre of Deventer (1690 and 1699). He had probably met John Locke in the 1680s and almost certainly knew the Irish deist John Toland, who lived at The Hague in 1708–10. His life proceeded relatively uneventfully until 1727, when at the age of 72 the publication of his "Lettres choisies" caused a scandal. He was accused of spinozism, irreligious and immoral views. Attempts to clear his name failed, he was dismissed from his post as professor and left the Hanseatic town. He died in 1738 in IJsselstein.

== Works ==
In Voyages et Aventures de Jacques Massé [Voyages And Adventures of Jacques Massé], published in 1714 (imprinted 1710), Tyssot de Patot dispatched his heroes to a fictional country located near South Africa. While the book did not range much beyond the confines of the traditional Utopias of the times, it did, however, include "living fossils," giant birds and strange flora that survived from prehistoric eras, arguably making it one of the first modern Lost World novels.

In his 1720 La Vie, les Aventures et le Voyage de Groenland du Révérend Père Cordelier Pierre de Mésange [The Life, Adventures & Trip To Greenland of the Rev. Father Pierre de Mesange], Tyssot de Patot introduced the concept of a Hollow Earth. This was the first time that the notion of a journey to the center of the Earth was depicted in a realistic, pseudo-scientific fashion, as opposed to the various mythological journeys to Hell, such as Dante Alighieri's The Divine Comedy. Tyssot de Patot's book predates that of Danish writer Ludvig Holberg Niels Klim's Underground Travels (1741) and Jules Verne's classic Journey to the Center of the Earth (1864).

Tyssot de Patot described how his protagonists discover a hidden, underground kingdom located near the North Pole. That kingdom is inhabited by the descendants of African colonists who had left their homeland four thousand years earlier. This proto-Pellucidar is lit by a mysterious fire ball and is inhabited by small man-bat creatures. The novel also featured the character of the Wandering Jew.

== Sources ==
- Jonathan Israel (2001) Radical Enlightenment: Philosophy and the Making of Modernity
- A. Roosenberg (1972) Tyssot de Patot and his work 1655-1738, the Hague (International archives of the history of ideas 47)
