= Pam Bachorz =

American author of speculative fiction

- Born: 1973 (age 52–53); Salem, Massachusetts
- Occupation: Author
- Writing career
- Genre: Speculative fiction
- Website: pambachorz.com

Pam Bachorz (born 1973) is an author of speculative fiction from the United States.

== Biography ==
Bachorz was born in 1973 in Salem, Massachusetts.

== Works ==
She has written two speculative fiction novels for young adults: Candor, published in 2009, and Drought, published in 2011.

Candor, set in the near future, uses a trope common to horror in speculative fiction, that of a small town "malevolently under some kind of mesmeric or unholy control". The novel's protagonist is Oscar Banks, the son of the town's founder and the operator of its system of indoctrination. Banks pretends to be a conformist, while covertly helping residents escape. Publishers Weekly described it as a compelling story while saying some aspects of the premise were "difficult to swallow". Wired praised Bachorz's ability to keep the plot moving and build suspense, but described the book as "not terribly deep".

Bachorz's second novel, Drought, is also set in a small and coercive community, which the protagonist seeks to escape.

== Publications ==
- Candor (2009, EgmontUSA, ISBN 978-1-6068-4012-2)
- Drought (2011, EgmontUSA, ISBN 978-1-6068-4016-0)

== Awards ==
Year	Title	Award	Result	Ref.
2009	Candor	ALA Best Books for Young Adults	Nominee	
2009	Candor	Cybils Award for Young Adult Speculative Fiction	Finalist	
2011	Candor	Popular Paperbacks for Young Adults	Selection	
2011	Candor	YALSA Teens' Top Ten	Nominee	
