= Andrzej Trepka =

Polish journalist and science fiction writer

Andrzej Trepka (1923–2009) was a Polish journalist and science fiction writer. He was a cofounder of the Polish Astronautical Society.
