= E. J. Perry =

E. J. Perry may refer to:

- E. J. Perry (artist) (1880–1946), American silhouette artist based in New York City
- E. J. Perry (American football) (born 1998), American football quarterback
