= The Cancer of Superstition =

1920s unpublished book by C. M. Eddy Jr.

The Cancer of Superstition is a book by C. M. Eddy Jr. that investigates ideas and trends of superstition throughout history. He was commissioned to write a book on the subject by famed magician and escapologist Harry Houdini from an outline provided by H. P. Lovecraft.

== Background ==
The incomplete 31-page manuscript was discovered in a collection of materials procured by a private collector from a magic shop that had closed. Houdini and Lovecraft scholars knew of the book previously, but until this incomplete manuscript (which has pages missing) was found in 2016, no version of the work was known to exist. It remains unclear what parts were written by Eddy and what by Lovecraft. A synopsis of the book, as well as a single chapter titled "The Genesis of Superstition", was published in the 1966 as part of the book The Dark Brotherhood and Other Pieces.

In The Dark Brotherhood and Other Pieces 1966 August Derleth writes:

Early in the 1920s Harry Houdini retained H. P. Lovecraft to ghost-write for him, and one of Lovecraft's ghost-written tales appeared in Weird Tales in 1924 under the title Imprisoned with the Pharaohs. Soon after, he also enlisted the talents of C. M. Eddy, Jr. and in the course of their work together Houdini outlined sketchily a book he thought ought to be done on the origins, growth and fallacy of superstition. He suggested that Eddy might prepare the book, and furnished him with voluminous notes and ideas that he wanted incorporated in the book; he suggested also that perhaps H. P. Lovecraft could put the notes into shape so that Eddy could work from the outline Lovecraft prepared.

In The 13 Gates of the Necronomican: A Workbook of Magic (2012) author Donald Tyson referred to the Lovecraft/Houdini collaboration as follows:

At the time of his death, Houdini had been corresponding with Lovecraft regarding a book on which they intended to collaborate, along with writer C.M. Eddy Jr., which was to be entitled "The Cancer of Superstition". Lovecraft prepared a detailed outline of the work, which is extant, and Barlow actually began the writing and completed three chapters, but Houdini's widow cancelled the project – perhaps because she was herself more inclined to believe in the reality of spiritualists phenomena than her skeptical late husband.

Tyson misidentifies Eddy as Barlow in the above quote and book.

== Conclusion ==
The Cancer of Superstition states: "all superstitious beliefs are relics of a common 'prehistoric ignorance' in humans", which lays a foundational sense of the book's thesis and raison d'être. Both Lovecraft as a writer of horror fiction and Houdini as an illusionist relied on people's superstitions in their careers, playing on audiences' and readers' senses of the unknown for heightened entertainment, while also advocating for greater skepticism in society.

== Legacy ==
In April 2016, the typewritten manuscript sold at auction for $33,600.
