= Winfield Townley Scott =

American poet

Winfield Townley Scott (April 30, 1910 – April 28, 1968) was an American poet and diarist. He also worked as a newspaperman and book reviewer.

== Biography ==
Scott was born in Haverhill, Massachusetts, seven days after the arrival of Halley's Comet. He was raised at Newport, Rhode Island and then returned to spend his teenaged years at Haverhill where he was editor of his high-school paper and developed his facility as a young poet. Savings provided by his grandfather enabled Scott to attend Brown University, from which he graduated in 1931.

After graduating from Brown he went to work for the city's main newspaper the Providence Journal, quickly becoming their book reviewer and Literary Editor. He also wrote book reviews for other titles and with the advent of radio worked as a broadcast voice.

In 1943 he married the young heiress Eleanor Metcalf. He retired his post as Literary Editor in 1951 to complete "a book-length narrative poem on the Viking discoverers of America" (Brown Alumni Monthly). He lived with Eleanor in Connecticut, until they went west in 1954 to join a colony of visual artists in Santa Fe where they supported the Santa Fe Opera for which they started a youth programme.

During the later part of his lifetime Scott was known for his journals (published diaries) as well as his poetry. He published his journals as A Dirty Hand (1958).

His biography is Poet in America: Winfield Townley Scott by Scott Donaldson, University of Texas Press, 1972.

== As an early critic of Lovecraft ==
Following his 1943 review of the second Arkham edition of H.P. Lovecraft (1890–1937), as literary editor of The Providence Journal and Evening Bulletin, Scott later penned an important early appreciation of horror writer H.P. Lovecraft — "His Own Most Fantastic Creation: Howard Phillips Lovecraft" (1944) for the newspaper. Another essay on Lovecraft, "Lovecraft as a Poet", first appeared in Rhode Island on Lovecraft (1945) and was reprinted elsewhere in a revised version as "A Parenthesis on Lovecraft as Poet." He also edited a memoir by Lovecraft's wife Sonia, published in the Providence Journal.

== Correspondence ==
He had briefly corresponded with H.P. Lovecraft, and in 1950, advised J. Warren Thomas about a biographical thesis. He also corresponded with Ruth Lechlitner. His friendship with George Starbuck led to his inclusion in Sonnet With a Different Letter at the End of Every Line.

== Awards ==
- 1963 National Book Award finalist
- 1939/1940 Shelley Memorial Award

== Works ==
=== Books of poems ===
- Biography for Traman (1937)
- Wind the Clock (1941)
- The Sword on the Table (1942)
- To Marry Strangers (1945)
- Mr. Whittier and Other Poems (1948)
- The Dark Sister (1958)
- Scrimshaw (1959)
- Collected Poems 1937-1962 (1962)
- Change of Weather (1964)

=== Diaries ===
- A Dirty Hand (University of Texas Press, 1969)

=== Essays ===
- Exiles and Fabrications (Doubleday, 1961)

== As editor ==
- La Farge, Oliver, The Man with the Calabash Pipe (Houghton Mifflin, 1966)
