= E. J. Perry (artist) =

American silhouettist (1880–1946)

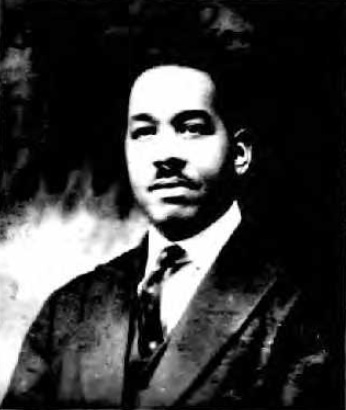
- E. J. Perry in 1920
- Born: February 11, 1880; Kershaw County, South Carolina
- Died: February 2, 1946 (aged 65); Islip, New York
- Style: Silhouette

Essaias James Perry (February 11, 1880 – February 2, 1946), or more commonly E. J. Perry, was an early-twentieth-century silhouette artist based in New York City. His decades-long activity was mostly associated with the city's Luna Park and Dreamland amusement parks at Coney Island, however it also included private resorts in Florida, and at least two known cultural expositions around the United States. He was an African American originally from Kershaw County, South Carolina, and mainly lived and worked in the city's Black neighborhoods of San Juan Hill and Harlem. He did a number of silhouette portraits of eminent people, including the writer H. P. Lovecraft, which appears on the memorial plaque for that author in Providence, Rhode Island, as well as the composer J. Rosamond Johnson.

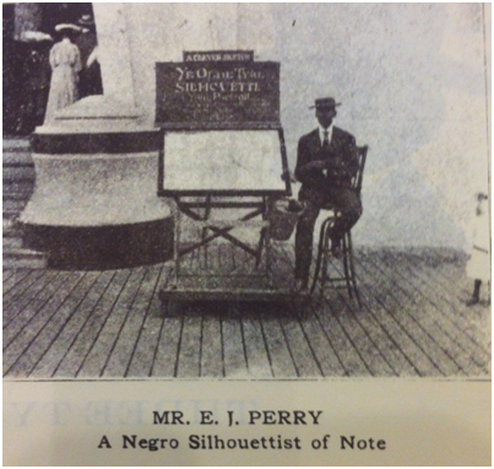
Portrait of E. J. Perry and his easel
