= Edward F. Daas =

Edward F. Daas (May 30, 1879 – May 2, 1962) was an American amateur journalist.

Daas joined the United Amateur Press Association within a year of its founding in 1895. In 1907 he was elected President and held the post one year. He also served as Official Editor in 1913 and 1915.

A lifelong resident of Milwaukee, Wisconsin (except for a brief stay in Washington, District of Columbia 1918-1920), he was instrumental in forming a local amateur press club there. At the time of his death, he was serving as UAPA Secretary.
