= Barton Levi St. Armand =

American writer and academic

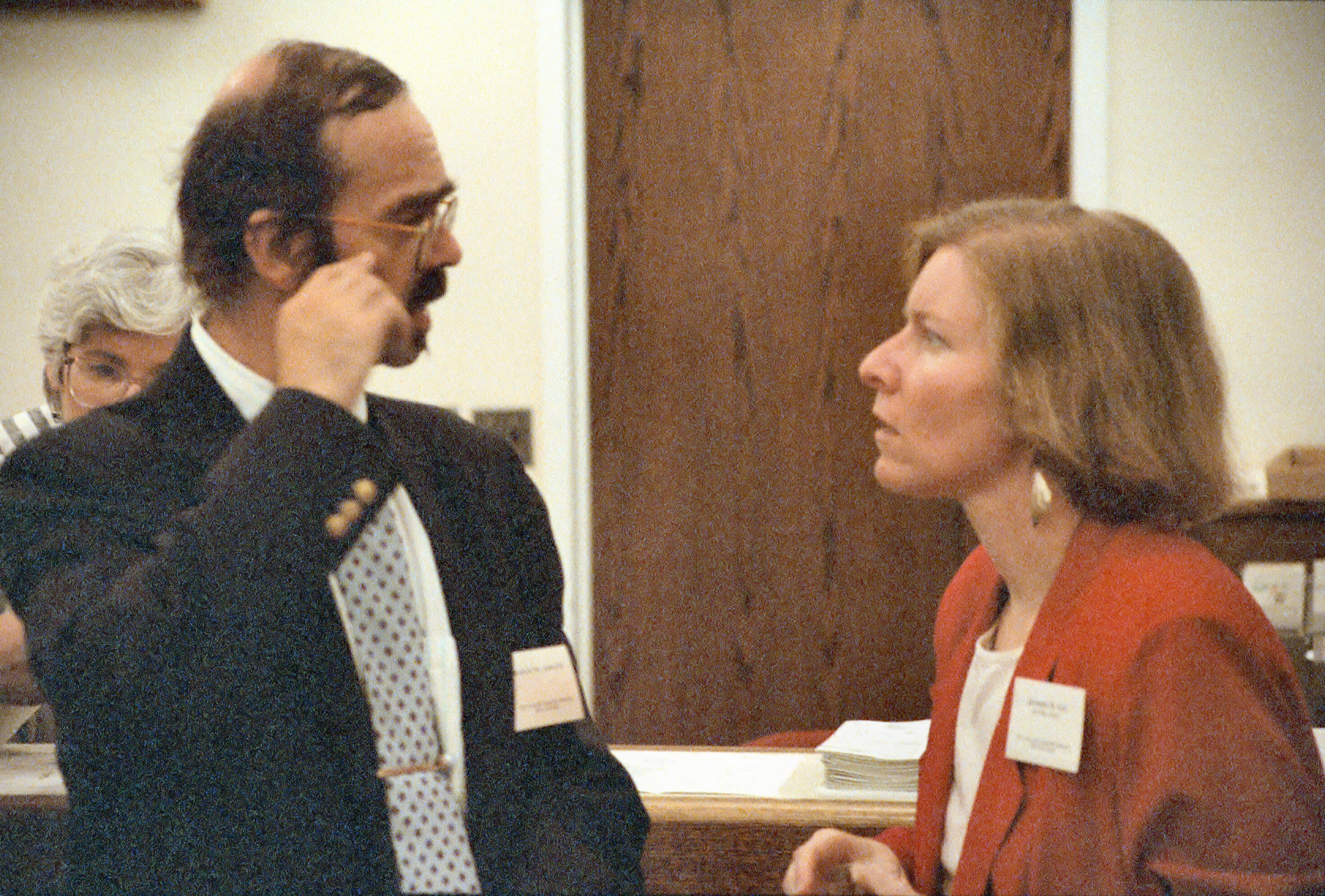
- St. Armand with Jennifer B. Lee, 17 August 1990
- Born: May 8, 1943 (age 83)

Academic background
- Education: Brown University
- Thesis: In the American Manner: An Inquiry into the Aesthetics of Emily Dickinson and Edgar Allan Poe (1969)

Academic work
- Discipline: English; American Studies
- Institutions: Brown University

Barton Levi St. Armand (born May 8, 1943) is an American writer and academic. He is professor emeritus of English and American Studies at Brown University.

== Education ==
Barton Levi St. Armand received a PhD from Brown University in 1968, earning three degrees in American civilization.

== Books ==
- Emily Dickinson and Her Culture: The Soul's Society (Cambridge, 1984)
- H. P. Lovecraft: New England Decadent (Silver Scarab Press, 1979)
- The Roots of Horror in the Fiction of H. P. Lovecraft (Dragon Press, 1977)
- with Jerome Liebling, Christopher E G Benfey, and Polly Longsworth The Dickinsons of Amherst (University Press of New England, 2001)
- Hypogeum: Poems of the Buried Life (Burning Deck, Distributed by Book People, 1975)
- Skeleton Leaves and Phantom Flowers: Select Poems (Hellcoal Press, 1970)
