= Edwin Baird =

American magazine editor (1886–1954)

- Born: June 28, 1886
- Died: September 27, 1954 (aged 68)
- Citizenship: United States
- Occupation: Magazine editor
- Spouse: Mildred Ward
- Writing career
- Language: English
- Genres: Horror, pulp fiction

Edwin Baird (/bɛərd/; June 28, 1886 in Chattanooga, Tennessee– September 27, 1954) was the first editor of Weird Tales, the pioneering pulp magazine that specialized in horror fiction, as well as Detective Tales, later re-titled Real Detective Tales.

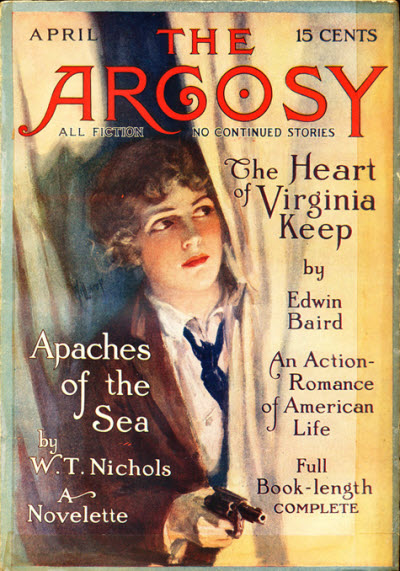
Baird's novel The Heart of Virginia Keep appeared in The Argosy in 1915.

== Career ==
Baird, hired by Weird Tales publisher J. C. Henneberger, put out the magazine's premiere issue, dated March 1923. Over the course of the next year, Baird published some of the magazine's most famous writers, including H. P. Lovecraft, Clark Ashton Smith, and Seabury Quinn.

Baird—in marked contrast to his successor—accepted everything that Lovecraft submitted to the magazine, including "The Hound", "Arthur Jermyn", "The Statement of Randolph Carter", "The Cats of Ulthar", "Dagon", "The Picture in the House", "The Rats in the Walls", "Hypnos" and "Imprisoned with the Pharaohs". He did, however, insist that Lovecraft retype his first submissions using double spacing, causing the author to remark, "I am not certain whether or not I should bother."

Under Baird's editorship, Weird Tales lost a considerable amount of money—estimated at $51,000. After the April 1924 issue, Henneberger fired him and offered his job to Lovecraft. When Lovecraft declined, the publisher made Farnsworth Wright, until then Baird's assistant, the editor of Weird Tales, a position he held until 1940.

Baird remained as editor of another of Henneberger's titles, Detective Tales. In this post, he rejected Lovecraft's "The Shunned House" in July 1925. Detective Tales was sold off, and Baird remained editor when it retitled as Real Detective Tales.

After the demise of Real Detective Tales, publisher John Lansinger and editor Baird launched Real America, a muckraking magazine. Baird took over as publisher and editor at the end of 1934. In late 1935, Baird sold off his interest and, under the new owners, the magazine failed quickly.
