= Allison V. Harding =

American writer

- Other name: Alice B. Harcraft
- Occupation: Writer
- Known for: Science fiction stories in Weird Tales

Allison V. Harding was the pen name of an author of science fiction and horror stories that appeared in Weird Tales magazine between 1943 and 1951. It may have been a house pseudonym; however, the byline has generally been associated with Jean Milligan and Lamont Buchanan since 2011.

== Jean Milligan and Lamont Buchanan ==
Jean Milligan (May 31, 1919 – December 6, 2004) was born in Cleveland, Ohio and raised in New Canaan, Connecticut, the daughter of John Raymond Milligan and Beatrice Isabel Humphrey Milligan. Her father was a banker, and her mother was a Smith College alumna active in clubwork. Her stepmother, Carina Eaglesfield Mortimer, was an architect and mapmaker. Milligan and her sisters were students at the Low-Heywood School in Stamford. She attended Connecticut College for Women in 1936 and 1937.

Milligan married Charles Lamont Buchanan Jr. in 1952. Buchanan, who wrote at least a dozen pictorial history books on steamships, railroads, aviation, the Confederacy, the Kentucky Derby, and baseball, was an associate editor of Weird Tales magazine during the editorship of Dorothy McIlwraith. Some have proposed that Buchanan wrote or collaborated with Milligan on the stories published under Harding's name; however, payments for the stories were made to Milligan. Milligan died in a New York City nursing home in 2004, at the age of 85. Buchanan died in 2015, leaving a significant fortune.

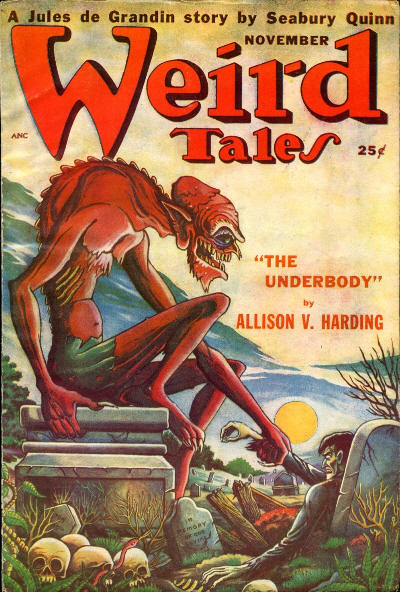
The cover of Weird Tales for November 1949, with Allison V. Harding mentioned prominently, with an illustration for "The Underbody", her story in that issue.

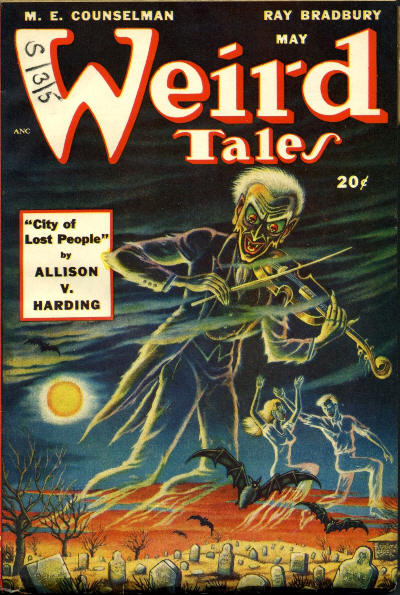
The cover of Weird Tales for May 1948, with Allison V. Harding mentioned prominently on the cover, with an illustration for her story, "City of Lost People".

== Works ==
Harding was "amongst the most prolific of all the contributors to Weird Tales". All of the following works originally appeared in Weird Tales or its sister publication, Short Stories between 1943 and 1951, and many were later included in anthologies of science fiction and horror.

- "The Unfriendly World" (July 1943)
- "Night Must Not Come" (September 1943)
- "Death Went That Way (November 1943)
- "House of Hate" (January 1944)
- "The Marmot" (March 1944)
- "The Day the World Stood Still" (May 1944)
- "Guard in the Dark" (July 1944)
- "The Seven Seas are One" (September 1944)
- "Night Without Darkness" (September 1944)
- "Death Whistles Twice" (October 1944)
- "Ride the El to Doom" (November 1944) (reprinted in Canada in 1946 under the byline Alice B. Harcraft) (longlisted for the 1945 Retro Hugo Award)
- "Revolt of the Trees" (January 1945)
- "Fog Country" (July 1945)
- "Night of the Impossible Shadows" (September 1945)
- "The Murderous Steam Shovel" (November 1945)
- "Tunnel Terror" (March 1946)
- "The Wings" (July 1946)
- "The Machine" (September 1946)
- "Shipmate" (November 1946)
- "The House Beyond Midnight" (January 1947)
- "Ticket to Doom" (January 1947)
- "The Immortal Lancer" (March 1947)
- "The Place with Many Windows" (May 1947)
- "The Damp Man" (July 1947)
- "The Damp Man Returns" (September 1947)
- "The Inn by Doomsday Falls" (November 1947)
- "The Frightened Engineer" (January 1948)
- "The Coming of M. Alkerhaus" (March 1948)
- "The Double Feature Murders" (April 1948)
- "City of Lost People" (May 1948)
- "Isle of Women" (July 1948)
- "The Follower" (September 1948)
- "The House on Forest Street" (November 1948)
- "Crime of a Thousand Clues" (December 1948)
- "Four from Jehlam" (January 1949)
- "The Holiday (March 1949)
- "The Damp Man Again" (May 1949)
- "The Deep Drowse" (September 1949)
- "The Underbody" (November 1949)
- "Corpse on Vacation" (January 1950)
- "Take the Z Train" (March 1950)
- "Scope" (January 1951)

== Legacy ==
In 2011, blogger Terence E. Hanley connected Harding's works to Milligan and Buchanan; investigations by others confirmed this connection. Sixteen of her stories were collected and published as Allison V. Harding: The Forgotten Queen of Horror Fiction (Armchair Fiction, 2020) and more than a dozen have been recorded for the HorrorBabble audio series. "It seems that we're in the middle of an Allison V. Harding mini-Renaissance," wrote reviewer Cora Buhlert in 2020.
