= Under the Pyramids =

1924 short story by H. P. Lovecraft

"Imprisoned with the Pharaohs"
- Short story by H. P. Lovecraft; Harry Houdini
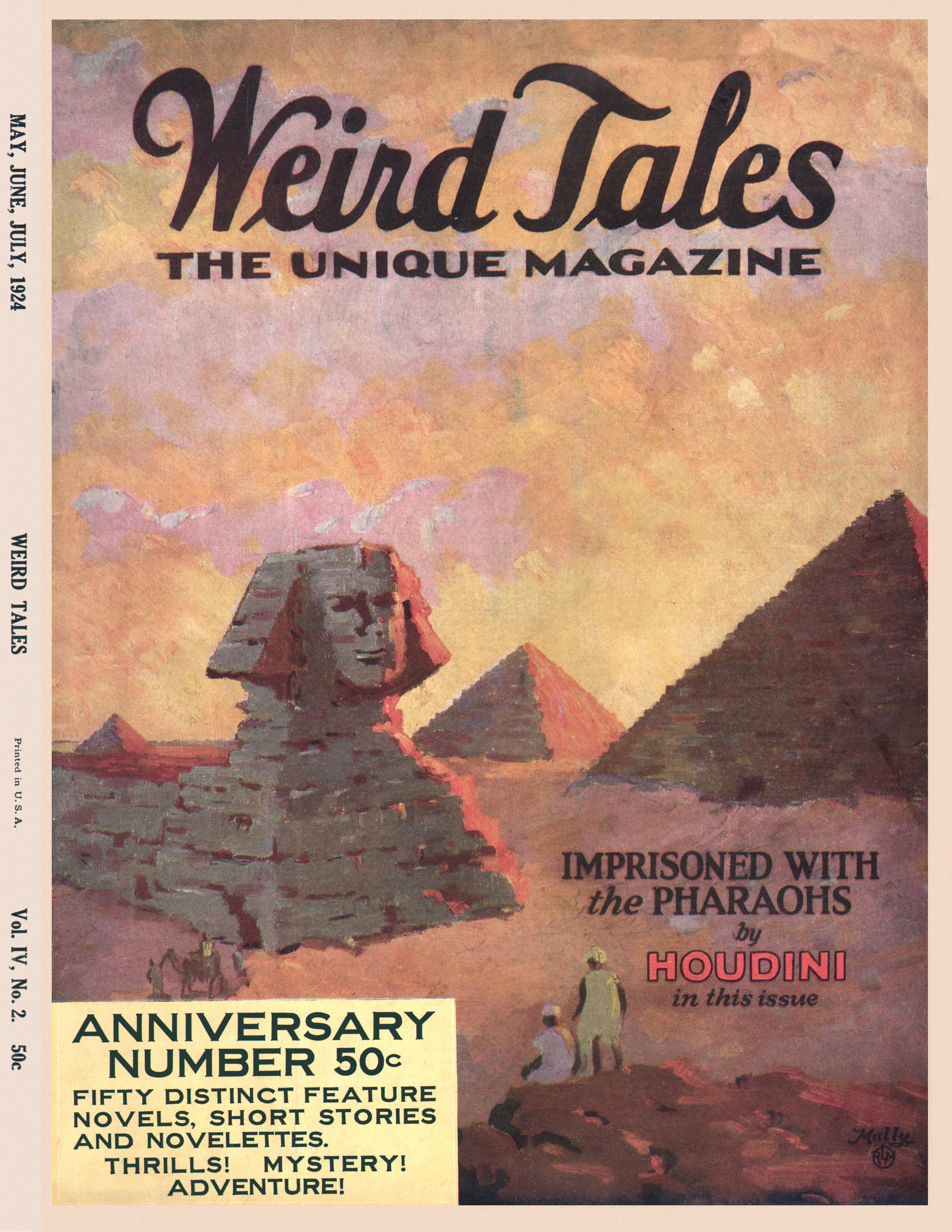
- Cover of the May–June–July 1924 edition of Weird Tales, featuring Imprisoned with the Pharaohs

Text available at Wikisource
- Country: United States
- Language: English
- Genre: Fantasy

Publication
- Published in: Weird Tales
- Publication type: Literary journal
- Media type: Print
- Publication date: May 1924

"Imprisoned with the Pharaohs" (called "Under the Pyramids" in draft form, also published as "Entombed with the Pharaohs") is a short story written by American fantasy author H. P. Lovecraft in collaboration with Harry Houdini in February 1924. Commissioned by Weird Tales founder and owner J. C. Henneberger, the narrative tells a fictionalized account in the first-person perspective of an allegedly true experience of escape artist Harry Houdini. Set in 1910, in Egypt, Houdini finds himself kidnapped by a tour guide, who resembles an ancient pharaoh, and thrown down a deep hole near the Great Sphinx of Giza. While attempting to find his way out, he stumbles upon a gigantic ceremonial cavern and encounters the real-life deity that inspired the building of the Sphinx.

Lovecraft accepted the job due to an advance payment from Henneberger. The result was published in the May–June–July 1924 edition of Weird Tales, although it was credited solely to Houdini until the 1939 reprint. Despite Lovecraft's use of artistic license, Houdini enjoyed the tale and the two men collaborated on several smaller projects prior to the latter's death in 1926. "Imprisoned with the Pharaohs" has been suggested as an early influence on author Robert Bloch and as anticipating the cosmic themes in Lovecraft's later work, including "The Shunned House".

== Synopsis ==
Told from the first-person perspective of escape artist Harry Houdini, "Imprisoned with the Pharaohs" is a fictionalized account of an encounter that he claims to have experienced while on vacation in Egypt in January 1910. Enlisting the services of a guide named Abdul Reis el Drogman, Houdini is taken on a tour of Cairo and eventually forced to break up a conflict between his guide and a Bedouin leader by the name of Ali Ziz. Drogman enlists Houdini to help him settle the fight by way of a "custom of great antiquity in Cairo": a boxing match atop the Great Pyramid of Giza. Houdini soon discovers, however, that the entire argument was merely a ruse designed to lure him into the desert at night and kidnap him. The escape artist is tied up, taken to an unknown location, and dropped down a deep pit.

After dreaming of spectacular horrors, Houdini awakens at the bottom of the pit and eventually manages to free himself from the ropes. Suspecting that he is somewhere in a temple under the Great Sphinx of Giza, he travels through the dark in an attempt to find an exit, following what he believes to be a draft from outdoors. Instead, he discovers that he has actually been heading further underground, eventually falling down a flight of stairs and landing in a large ceremonial cavern. There he witnesses an army of half-man, half-animal mummies, led by the ancient Egyptian pharaohs Khephren and Nitokris, leaving offerings to a hippopotamus-sized, five-headed, tentacled beast that appears from a hole deep in the hall. As he escapes, he realizes that this creature is merely the paw of a much larger deity in whose image the Sphinx was carved. Houdini dismisses the events as a hallucination or a dream consequent of the strains of his kidnapping ordeal, despite the resemblance he sees between Khephren and his guide, Drogman.

== Background ==
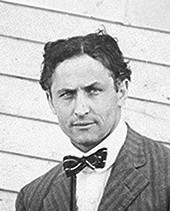
Harry Houdini was pleased with the result of Lovecraft's work and collaborated on several other projects with him prior to Houdini's death in 1926.

Facing financial problems, J. C. Henneberger, the founder and owner of Weird Tales, wanted to associate the popular Harry Houdini with the magazine in order to boost its readership. Following the introduction of an "Ask Houdini" column, as well as the publication of two short stories allegedly written by the escape artist, Henneberger sought out Lovecraft in February 1924 and commissioned him to write the tale of a supposedly true experience that Houdini had had in Egypt. Lovecraft was paid $100 (approximately $1879 in present-day terms) to ghostwrite the story, at the time the largest sum he had ever been given as an advance. This was a major factor in motivating him to take the job as, after listening to Houdini's story and researching its background, Lovecraft concluded that the tale was completely fabricated and requested permission from Henneberger to take artistic license. After receiving clearance from the editor, he began his writing by spending considerable time researching the setting in books issued by the Metropolitan Museum of Art as well as by frequently visiting the museum's Egyptian exhibits.

Lovecraft completed "Imprisoned with the Pharaohs" in February 1924 but lost his original typescript of the story at Union Station in Providence, Rhode Island when he was on his way to New York to get married. He was forced to spend much of his honeymoon in Philadelphia retyping the manuscript. The work's original title, "Under the Pyramids", is known only from the lost and found advertisement that he placed in The Providence Journal. The tale was printed in the May–June–July 1924 edition of Weird Tales as "Imprisoned with the Pharaohs" and without credit to Lovecraft in the byline, as Henneberger thought that this would confuse the readers, as the narrative was told entirely from Houdini's first-person perspective. Lovecraft would later receive credit in the editor's note of the 1939 reprint.

== Reception and legacy ==
"Imprisoned with the Pharaohs" became a popular story and was received favorably by Houdini. The escape artist was so impressed that, until his death, he continued offering the writer jobs and ghostwriting opportunities. Among them was an article criticizing astrology (for which he was paid $75 – approximately $1409 in present-day terms) and a book entitled The Cancer of Superstition, of which Lovecraft had completed an outline and some introductory pages prior to Houdini's 1926 death. To thank the author for his work, Houdini gave Lovecraft a signed copy of his 1924 book A Magician Among the Spirits. Lovecraft scholar S. T. Joshi praised the tale, calling it "surprisingly effective and suspenseful, with a genuinely surprising ending". Science fiction and fantasy author, editor, and critic Lin Carter, in his 1972 work Lovecraft: A Look Behind the Cthulhu Mythos, refers to the story as "one of the best things Lovecraft had written up to that time".

"Imprisoned with the Pharaohs" has been cited as an early influence on Robert Bloch, which is particularly evident in his tale "Fane of the Black Pharaoh". Although Lovecraft himself refers to the real sphinx as a god of the dead, Bloch expanded upon the mythos and claimed that the sphinx in "Imprisoned with the Pharaohs" was actually Nyarlathotep, an Outer God and Lovecraft creation. The idea of a twist ending, where a terrible discovery is made worse by the realization that it is only part of a larger horror, was used again in "The Shunned House", written later that year. In this tale, the protagonist digs into the cellar of the eponymous dwelling only to find that the thing he believed to be the monster of the tale is only the beast's elbow. The text of "Imprisoned with the Pharaohs", like many of Lovecraft's works, is in the public domain and can be found in several compilations of the author's work as well as on the Internet.
