= Dorothy McIlwraith =

- Born: October 14, 1891; Hamilton, Ontario, Canada
- Died: August 23, 1976 (aged 84); Orangeville, Ontario, Canada
- Occupation: Magazine editor
- Writing career
- Language: English
- Genres: Horror, pulp fiction

Dorothy Stevens McIlwraith (October 14, 1891 – August 23, 1976) was the third editor of Weird Tales, the pioneering pulp magazine that specialized in horror fiction and fantasy fiction. She also edited Short Stories magazine.

== Life and career ==
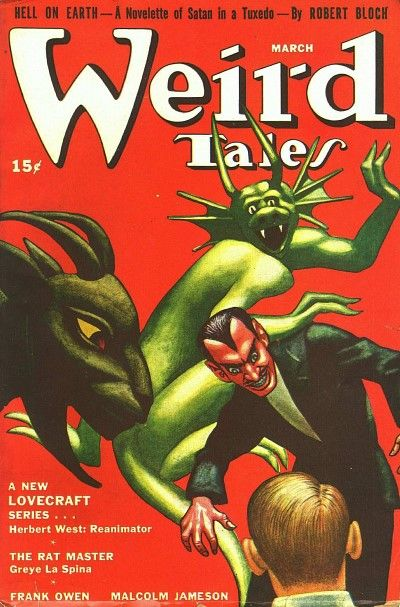
Cover of the March 1942 issue, by Hannes Bok

McIlwraith graduated from McGill University in 1914 and became a reader and editor for Doubleday, Page and Company. She worked as an assistant to Harry E. Maule (1886-1971), the editor of Doubleday's Short Stories magazine. In 1936, she became the editor of the magazine. In 1937, Short Stories Inc purchased the magazine and McIlwraith continued as the editor.

In 1938, Short Stories Inc purchased Weird Tales magazine. The magazine's editor, Farnsworth Wright was in poor health and resigned as editor in 1940. McIlwraith took over as full editor at this point and would remain editor until the magazine ceased publication in 1954. Under her editorship authors and artists such as Ray Bradbury and Hannes Bok first appeared in the magazine.

== Weird Tales Magazine, 1940-1954 ==
As the first female editor of WT, McIlwraith's work "paved the way" for women in the field of weird and horror fiction, with the perhaps predictable result that there have been wildly divergent assessments of the level of her success in this role.

Robert Weinberg, the author of an influential 1985 history of the magazine, characterized McIlwraith as lacking: "much of the uniqueness of the magazine was gone" Others would praise her for her perseverance as the market for pulp magazines faded (and the magazine's new publisher William J. Delaney--from 1938--cut wages and budgets and restricted the publication of works he considered "nasty" in tone). "Dorothy McIlwraith took over a magazine that had always struggled and carried it through for over fourteen years as markets, magazines, and the tastes of the reading public changed. The deaths of Lovecraft and Howard were a disaster. Weird Tales may never have recovered from that disaster. But it survived until September 1954, mostly under the editorship of Dorothy McIlwraith." Indeed, "as a number of authors from that period would recall," it was McIlwraith's unique qualities, personal and editorial, "including her willingness to strike out in new directions," that kept WT alive until 1954, despite its uncompetitive wages for authors and artists.

Retrospectively, it is clear that WT was among the most influential pulps of the 20th century, and that McIlwraith served as its editor for a substantial part of its heyday years.
