= Le Rayon fantastique =

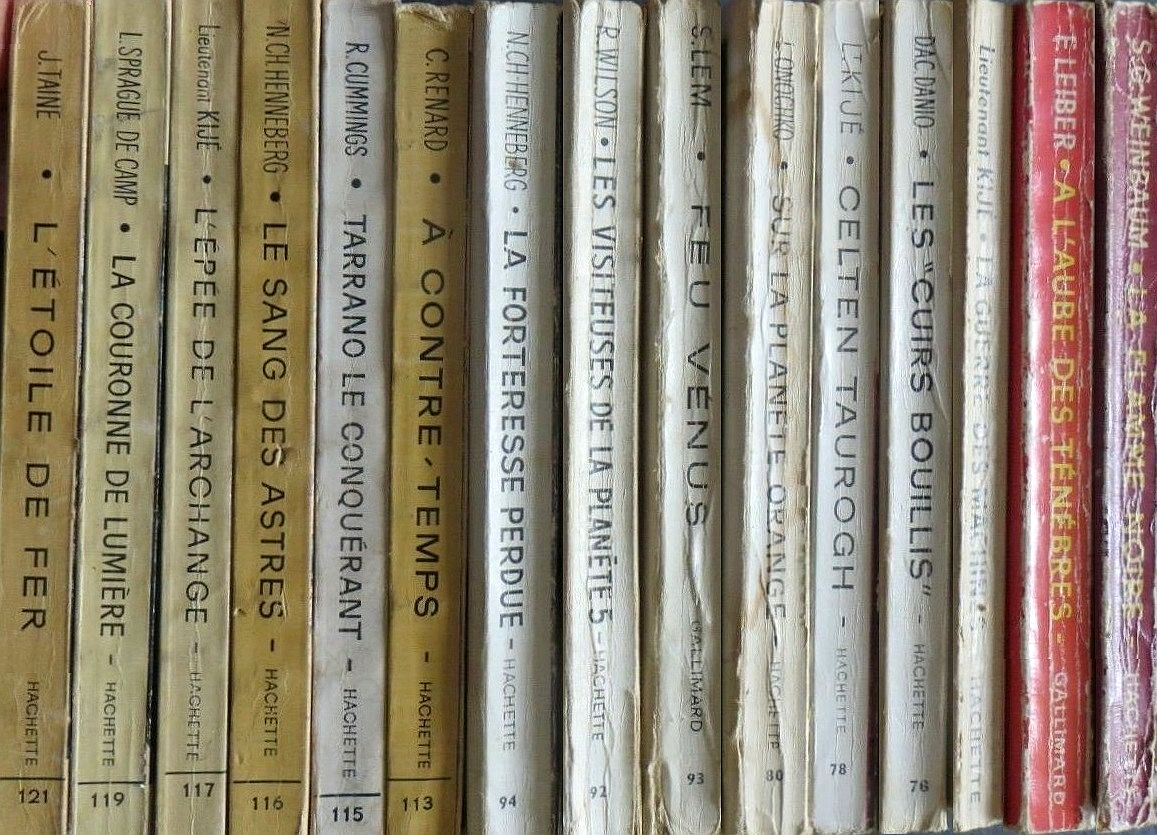
Some works from the series

Le Rayon fantastique (English – The Fantastic Ray) was a collection of science fiction novels co-published by éditions Gallimard and Hachette between January 1951 and February 1964. The first work in the collection was Assassinat des États-Unis de Will Jenkins (better known under the pseudonym Murray Leinster).

It symbolised a revival in science-fiction writing in the 1950s and reignited public passion for the genre, making great American 'Golden Age' writers like Edmond Hamilton, Theodore Sturgeon, A. E. van Vogt, Isaac Asimov, Robert A. Heinlein, Arthur C. Clarke and Clifford D. Simak widely known in France for the first time and launching a new generation of French writers in the genre, such as Francis Carsac, Daniel Drode, Philippe Curval, Gérard Klein, Michel Jeury (under the pseudonym Albert Higon), Françoise d'Eaubonne, Pierre Barbet and Nathalie and Charles Henneberg.

== History ==
It had two births, the first at Gallimard on 22 November 1949 when it commissioned Martinique-born writer Michel Pilotin (1906–1972) to create a science-fiction collection for them. Between 1950 and 1951 Pilotin prepared that collection by buying the rights on translations of American works and seeking French authors in the genre.

In the meantime Hachette had commissioned science fiction fan Georges H. Gallet to create a science fiction collection entitled Le Rayon fantastique in response to the 1950le Figaro article "La science-fiction remplacera-t-elle le roman policier ?" ("Will science fiction replace the detective novel?"), based on an interview between Gallet and a journalist. To avoid competition, the two publishing houses decided to publish the series jointly, with the project edited by Pierre-André Gruénais (1919–1993), director of the general literature department at Hachette, Pilotin (under the name Stephen Spriel) for Gallimard and Gallet for Hachette.

== Publication ==
From number 81 (La Terre endormie by Arcadius) onwards, for reasons of economy, the works were alternately printed in France and at the Ars Polona press in Warsaw, Poland. From number 97 (Griada by A. Kolpakov) to the end of the collection they were solely printed in Poland.

Due to its double origins, the works' numbering is sometimes very approximate, with 124 works but only "109 volumes in all" and no numbers assigned to the first 66 titles or to number 73 (Druso by Friedrich Freksa), with the latter inserted between two numbered titles.

From number 81 onwards the number was in theory separated from the title on the back cover by a horizontal line, though many later works did not do so. Five works bear a double number, number 111 was never assigned and number 110 was assigned twice (the correct holder was La Machine suprême by John W. Campbell as it was the first of the two to be published). Despite all this, an 'official' list of already-published works appeared at the end of some of the works.

== Covers ==
The covers evolved over time. Initially unillustrated, they later alternated between stylised images and realistic ones according to the artists (Jean Delpech, Troy, René Caillé, Georges Pichard, Jean Latappy, Lucien Lepiez and several who remained anonymous). Jean-Claude Forest arrived in 1958, producing more than half the subsequent cover designs, veering from stylised images to totally abstract ones.

Simultaneously, a 'black' series was followed by 'brown', 'red' and (under Forest) 'white' or 'cream' ones, all named after the colour of the background used. From n° 118 (Métro pour l'enfer by Vladimir Volkoff, 1963) until the last work (n° 124, Rêve de feu by Françoise d'Eaubonne, 1964) the cover illustrations were shaped like a cinema or television screen, with a white background and a black frame.télévision (cadre noir, fond blanc).

- N° 1–6 : Black background, greenish ribbon winding from bottom to top, titles in white letters on an irregular red polygon.
- N° 7–15 : anonymous, very 1950s style, (n° 13 : illegible signature).
- N° 16–19 : by Jean Delpech.
- N° 20, 23, 24 : by Troy.
- N° 21, 22, 26–28, 31, 33, 46 : by René Caillé.
- N° 25, 29–30, 32, 34–39, 42–44, 52, 54–56, 58, 60, 61, 89 (Note: Its style suggests Jean Latappy.) : Anonymous, no visible signatures.
- N° 40 : hard-to-read signature (NESSO ?).
- N° 41 : hard-to-read signature (NEJAO ou MEJAO ?).
- N° 45 : illegible signature starting Nef… or Nes… (?); cf. n° 40, 41.
- N° 53, 59, 73 : Georges Pichard.
- From n° 57 (L'Adieu aux astres by Serge Martel, 1958) onwards : almost all by Forest except:
  - N° 91, 95–96, 98, 101–102, 104, 106 : Jean Latappy.
  - N° 93 : Lucien Lepiez.

== List ==
1. Assassinat des États-Unis (1951), by Will Jenkins (The Murder of the USA, 1945)
2. Les Rois des étoiles (1951), by Edmond Hamilton (The Star Kings, 1947)
3. Le Règne du gorille (1951), by Lyon Sprague de Camp and Peter Schuyler Miller (Genus Homo, 1941)
4. Les Demi-Dieux (1951), by Alfred Gordon Bennet (The Demigods, 1939)
5. Les Corsaires du vide (1951), by James Morgan Walsh (Vandals of the Void, 1931)
6. Passagère clandestine pour Mars (1951), by John Beynon (Stowaway to Mars, 1936)
7. Le Triangle à quatre côtés (1952), by William F. Temple (Four-Sided Triangle, 1949)
8. Cristal qui songe (1952), by Theodore Sturgeon (The Dreaming Jewels, 1950)
9. Le Choc des mondes (1952), by Edwin Balmer and Philip Wylie (When Worlds Collide, 1933)
10. Guerres aux invisibles (1952), by Eric Frank Russell (Sinister Barrier, 1939)
11. Rien qu'un surhomme (1952), by Olaf Stapledon (Odd John: A Story Between Jest and Earnest, 1935)
12. Le Silence de la Terre (1952), by C. S. Lewis (Out of the Silent Planet, 1938)
13. Agonia della Terra (1952), by Edmond Hamilton (City at World's End, 1950)
14. Le Monde des Ā (1952), by A. E. van Vogt (The World of Ã, 1948)
15. La Faune de l'espace (1952), by A. E. van Vogt (The Voyage of the Space Beagle, 1950)
16. Cailloux dans le ciel (1953), by Isaac Asimov (Pebble in the Sky, 1950)
17. Un martien sur la Terre (1953), by Oscar J. Friend (The Kid from Mars, 1940)
18. Le Dernier Astronef (1953), by Murray Leinster (The Last Spaceship, 1949)
19. Germes de vie (1953), by John Taine (Seeds of life, 1931)
20. L'Enfant de la science (1953), by Robert A. Heinlein (Beyond This Horizon, 1942)
21. L'Univers en folie (1953), by Fredric Brown (What Mad Universe, 1949)
22. Après le choc des mondes (1954), by Edwin Balmer and Philip Wylie (After Worlds Collide, 1934)
23. Ceux de nulle part (1954), by Francis Carsac
24. La Curée des astres (1954), by Edward Elmer Smith (The Skylark of Space, 1928)
25. Marionnettes humaines (1954), by Robert A. Heinlein (The Puppet Masters, 1951)
26. Escales dans l'infini (1954); anthology edited by Georges H. Gallet and consisting of :
  - Odyssée martienne, by Stanley G. Weinbaum (A Martian Odyssey, 1934)
  - Touristes des temps futurs, by John Wyndham (Pauwley's Peepholes, 1951)
  - La Girafe bleue, by Lyon Sprague de Camp (The Blue Giraffe, 1939)
  - Shambleau, by Catherine Lucille Moore (Shambleau, 1933)
  - Colin-maillard, by John Ulrich Giesy (Blind Man's Buff)
  - L'Homme-machine d'Ardathia, by Francis Flagg (The Machine Man of Ardathia, 1927)
  - La Bête du vide, by Raymond Z. Gallun (A Beast of the Void, 1936)
  - Trois lignes de vieux français, by Abraham Merritt (Three Lines of Old French, 1919)
  - Station interplanétaire n° 1, by Manly Wade Wellman (Space Station No. 1, 1936)
  - Le Sourire du sphinx, by William F. Temple (The Smile of the Sphinx, 1938)
27. Le Microbe détective (1954), by Hal Clement (Needle, 1950)
28. Le Lendemain de la machine (1954), by Francis G. Rayer (Tomorrow Sometimes Comes, 1951)
29. La Révolte des femmes (1954), by Jerry Sohl (The Haploids, 1952)
30. À la poursuite des Slans (1954), by A. E. van Vogt (Slan, 1946)
31. Mission secrète sur Neptune (1955), by James Morgan Walsh (Vanguard to Neptune, 1932)
32. Vuzz… (1955), by P. A. Hourey
33. Kilsona, monde atomique (1955), by Festus Pragnell (The Green Man of Graypec, 1935)
34. Les Robinsons du cosmos (1955), by Francis Carsac
35. La Fleur diabolique (1955), by George O. Smith (Hellflower, 1953)
36. La Flamme noire (1956), by Stanley G. Weinbaum (The Black Flame, 1939)
37. Les Survivants de l'infini (1956), by Raymond F. Jones (This Island Earth, 1952)
38. Chaîne autour du soleil (1956), by Kurt Simak (pseudonym of Clifford D. Simak; Ring Around the Sun, 1953)
39. Les Dents du dragon (1956), by Jack Williamson (Dragon's Island, 1951)
40. Satellite No. 1 (1956), by Philip St. John (pseudonym of Lester del Rey; Rockets to Nowhere, 1954)
41. Les Cavernes d'acier (1956), by Isaac Asimov (The Caves of Steel, 1953)
42. Les Enfants d'Icare (1956), by Arthur C. Clarke (Childhood's End, 1953)
43. Le 9 de pique (1956), by John Amila
44. Fondation (1957), by Isaac Asimov (Foundation, 1942)
45. Les Plus qu'humains (1957), by Theodore Sturgeon (More Than Human, 1953)
46. L'Aventurier de l'espace (1957), by Catherine Lucille Moore; collection combining works from two separate American collections (Shambleau and Others, 1953, and Northwest of Earth, 1954) :
  - Songe vermeil (1957) (Scarlet Dream, 1934)
  - L'Arbre de vie (1957) (The Tree of Life, 1936)
  - La Soif noire (1957) (Black Thirst, 1934)
  - Paradis perdu (1957) (Lost Paradise, 1936)
  - La Poussière des dieux (1957) (Dust of Gods, 1934)
  - Julhi (1957) (Julhi, 1935)
  - Le Dieu gris (1957) (The Cold Gray God, 1935)
  - Yvala (1957) (Yvala, 1936)
47. Planète interdite, by Philip MacDonald (Forbidden Planet, 1956); novelisation of the film of the same name
48. Le Gouffre de la Lune (1957), by Abraham Merritt (The Moon Pool, 1919)
49. Les Aventures de Ā (1957), by A. E. van Vogt (The Pawns of Null-A, 1949)
50. Le Monstre de métal (1957), by Abraham Merritt (The Metal Monster, 1920)
51. Le Flot du temps (1957), by John Taine (The Time Stream, 1932)
52. La Légion de l'espace (1958), by Jack Williamson (The Legion of Space, 1934)
53. Embûches dans l'espace (1958), by François Pagery
54. Vénus et le Titan (1958), by Henry Kuttner (Fury, 1947)
55. Planète à gogos (1958), by Frederik Pohl and Cyril M. Kornbluth (The Space Merchants, 1952)
56. Le péril vient de la mer (1958), by John Wyndham (The Kraken Wakes, 1953)
57. L'Adieu aux astres (1958), by Serge Martel; prix Jules-Verne
58. L'Homme qui vendit la Lune (1958), by Robert A. Heinlein (The Man Who Sold the Moon, 1949)
59. Double Étoile (1958), by Robert A. Heinlein (Double Star, 1956)
60. Le Maître du temps (1958), by Ray Cummings (The Man Who Mastered Time, 1929)
61. À l'aube des ténèbres (1958), by Fritz Leiber (Gather, Darkness!, 1943)
62. Le Gambit des étoiles (1958), by Gérard Klein
63. Surface de la planète (1959), by Daniel Drode; prix Jules-Verne
64. L'Ogive du monde (1959), by Matteo Tavera and François Tavera
65. La Rosée du soleil (1959), by Nathalie and Charles Henneberg
66. La Guerre des machines (1959), by Lieutenant Kijé
67. L'Aventure alphéenne (1960), by Serge Martel
68. Aux étoiles du destin (1960), by Albert Higon
69. Les Navigateurs de l'infini (1960), by J.-H. Rosny aîné
70. Avant le premier jour (1960), by Robert Anton (Vor dem ersten Tag, 1959)
71. La Machine du pouvoir (1960), by Albert Higon; prix Jules-Verne
72. Terre en fuite (1960), by Francis Carsac
73. Druso (1960), by Friedrich Freksa (Druso oder: Die gestohlene Menschenwelt, 1931)
74. L'Homme double (1960), by René Cambon; cover by Jean-Claude Forest
75. Les Fleurs de Vénus (1960), by Philippe Curval
76. Les « Cuirs bouillis » (1960), by D. A. C. Danio
77. Plus noir que vous ne pensez (1961), by Jack Williamson
78. Celten Tauroch (1961), by Lieutenant Kijé
79. Quatre pas dans l'étrange (1961); anthology of short stories :
  - La Force mystérieuse, by J.-H. Rosny aîné
  - Par la malle de nuit, by Rudyard Kipling (With the Night Mail, 1905)
  - L'Éternel Adam, by Michel Verne (then attributed to Jules Verne)
  - R. U. R., by Karel Čapek (R.U.R., 1920)
80. Sur la planète orange (1961), by Оношко, Леонид Михайлович (На оранжевой планете, 1959)
81. La Terre endormie (1961), by Arcadius; cover by Jean-Claude Forest
82. Le Sub-espace (1961), by Jérôme Sériel; prix Jules-Verne
83. Les Dieux verts (1961), by Nathalie and Charles Henneberg
84. Lutte avec la nuit, partie 1 (1961), by William Sloane (To Walk the Night, 1937); cover by Jean-Claude Forest
85. Lutte avec la nuit, partie 2 (1961), by William Sloane (To Walk the Night, 1937); cover by Jean-Claude Forest
86. Les Armureries d'Isher (1961), by A. E. van Vogt (The Weapon Shops of Isher, 1951)
87. Le Livre de Ptath (1961), by A. E. van Vogt (The Book of Ptath, 1947)
88. Les Sept Fils de l'étoile (1962), by Françoise d'Eaubonne
89. Déjà demain (1962), by Henry Kuttner and Catherine Lucille Moore (Ahead of Time, 1953); collection of novellas :
  - Jour de l'An (Year Day, 1953)
  - L'Œil était dans... (Private Eye, 1949)
  - Camouflage (Camouflage, 1945)
  - Fantôme (Ghost, 1943)
  - Saison de grand cru (Vintage Season, 1946)
  - Point de rupture (When the Bough Breaks, 1944)
  - Choc (Shock, 1943)
  - Le Twonky (The Twonky, 1942)
  - De profondis (De Profundis, 1953)
90. La Fin du quaternaire (1962), by Yvon Hecht
91. Ce monde est nôtre (1962), by Francis Carsac
92. Les Visiteuses de la planète 5 (1962), by Richard Wilson (The Girls from Planet 5, 1955)
93. Feu Vénus (1962), by Stanisław Lem (Astronauci, 1951)
94. La Forteresse perdue (1962), by Nathalie and Charles Henneberg
95. La Cité et les Astres, partie 1 (1962), by Arthur C. Clarke (The City and the Stars, 1956)
96. La Cité et les Astres, partie 2 (1962), by Arthur C. Clarke (The City and the Stars, 1956)
97. Griada (1962), by Колпаков, Александр Лаврентьевич (Гриада, 1959)
98. Vers un avenir perdu (1962), by Pierre Barbet
99. L'Échiquier du temps (1962), by Françoise d'Eaubonne
100. Le Ressac de l'espace (1962), by Philippe Curval
101. De temps à autre, partie 1 (1962), by Clifford D. Simak (Time and Again, 1951); prix Jules-Verne
102. De temps à autre, partie 2 (1962), by Clifford D. Simak (Time and Again, 1951); prix Jules-Verne
103. La Rive incertaine (1962), by William Sloane (The Edge of Running Water, 1939)
104. Pour patrie, l'espace (1962), by Francis Carsac
105. La Nef d'antim (1962), by Will Stewart (Seetee Ship, 1951)
106. Babel 3.805 (1962), by Pierre Barbet
107. Les Cométaires, partie 1 (1963), by Jack Williamson (The Cometeers, 1950)
108. Les Cométaires, partie 2 (1963), by Jack Williamson (The Cometeers, 1950)
109. Monde en oubli (1963), by J. T. McIntosh (World Out of Mind, 1953)
110. La Machine suprême (1963), by John W. Campbell (The Mightiest Machine, 1936); cover by Jean-Claude Forest
111. Planète d'exil (1963), by Arcadius
112. L'Assaut de l'invisible (1963), by A. E. van Vogt (Siege of the Unseen, 1946)
113. À contre-temps (1963), by Christine Renard
114. L'Erreur d'Alexei Alexeiev (1963), by Полещук, Александр Лазаревич (Ошибка инженера Алексеева, 1961)
115. Tarrano le conquérant (1963), by Ray Cummings (Tarrano the Conqueror, 1930)
116. Le Sang des astres (1963), by Nathalie and Charles Henneberg
117. L'Épée de l'archange (1963), by Lieutenant Kijé
118. Métro pour l'enfer (1963), by Vladimir Volkoff; prix Jules-Verne
119. La Couronne de lumière (1963), by Lyon Sprague de Camp (Rogue Queen, 1951)
120. Les Revenants des étoiles (1963), by Arcadi and Boris Strougatski (Возвращение, 1962)
121. L'Étoile de fer (1963), by John Taine (The Iron Star, 1930)
122. La Plaie, partie 1 (1964), by Nathalie and Charles Henneberg
123. La Plaie, partie 2 (1964), by Nathalie and Charles Henneberg
124. Rêve de feu (1964), by Françoise d'Eaubonne

== Bibliography ==
- (in French) « Vie et mort du "Rayon Fantastique" » by Georges H. Gallet, in pages 152 à 163 du recueil « Univers 03 » (November 1975).
