= Dreadful Sanctuary =

1948 novel by Eric Frank Russell

- Dust-jacket from the first edition
- Author: Eric Frank Russell
- Cover artist: Edd Cartier
- Language: English
- Genre: Science fiction
- Publisher: Fantasy Press
- Publication date: 1951
- Publication place: United States
- Media type: Print (Hardback)
- Pages: 275
- OCLC: 2080056

Dreadful Sanctuary is a science fiction novel by British author Eric Frank Russell. After its serialization in the American magazine Astounding Science Fiction in 1948, it was first published in book form in 1951 by Fantasy Press in an edition of 2,975 copies. Russell rewrote the novel for the first American paperback edition, published by Lancer Books in 1963. Editorial interference forced Russell to replace the original ending with a more tragic conclusion in this edition. A British hardcover was issued in 1953, with a paperback incorporating further "minor revisions" following in 1967. Italian translations of Dreadful Sanctuary were published in 1953 and 1986; a German translation appeared in 1971, and a French translation in 1978.

Partly inspired by Fortean ideas, the novel concerns an international conspiracy to prevent humanity from achieving space travel.

== Plot summary (1951 edition) ==
In 1972, John J. Armstrong, a physically large and powerful inventor from New York, becomes concerned by the failures of seventeen crewed and uncrewed rockets to reach the Moon. Professor Bob Mandle, a young scientist, dies mysteriously while discussing the rocket failures with Armstrong. Armstrong learns that the only remaining authorities of comparable stature are Professor Claire Mandle, the dead man's sister, and a Viennese scientist named Horowitz. Armstrong visits New Mexico, where the eighteenth Moon-rocket, to be piloted by George Quinn, is being built under the supervision of the obstructive Ambrose Fothergill. Armstrong also consults his friend Ed Drake, who worked on one of the earlier failed rockets, and Claire Mandle, to whom he feels an immediate attraction.

Armstrong hires Hansen, a private investigator, to research politicians and other opponents of rocketry. He has dinner with Claire Mandle, who tells him she is being followed; with Hansen's help, Armstrong learns she is being tailed by the FBI. Rocket scientist Clark Marshall is murdered in Armstrong's apartment by a sandy-haired man. Armstrong visits the Norman Club, to which many space travel opponents belong, where he is imprisoned and given two days to answer the question "How do you know you're sane?" He is then brought to meet Senator Lindle, the Norman Club director in New York and a leading opponent of rocketry. Armstrong tells Lindle that he does not know that he is sane. Lindle says that sanity can be proven and subjects him to a bizarre machine called a psychotron, which is operated by the scientist Horowitz. Lindle then tells Armstrong that the results show that he is sane. According to Lindle, all Earth humans except the Asian peoples are descended from insane Mercurians, Venusians and Martians exiled to Earth thousands of years earlier. Lindle claims that humans of European descent, including himself and Armstrong, are actually Martians, and that their loyalty should be to the people of Mars, whom they should help by preventing the spread of Earth's lunatics into the Solar System.

While Armstrong is telling Hansen about Lindle's claims, Hansen's office is invaded by the sandy-haired man and three others. They claim to be insane Martians who have been exiled to Earth and demand information on the nineteenth and twentieth Moon-rockets, of which Armstrong is unaware. Armstrong, Hansen and the police kill the four men, who were armed with torch-like devices that coagulate blood (the way Mandle and Marshall died). Armstrong kills two more "Martians" who try to kill him, and goes on the run after another of their devices sets fire to his apartment. He flies to New Mexico, where he becomes convinced that Fothergill knows about the other two rockets. In Washington, D.C., Armstrong enlists the aid of General Luther Gregory, who supports rocket development for military reasons. The world is on the brink of global war incited by the Norman Club to prevent travel to the Moon. Armstrong learns that Quinn, accused of Fothergill's murder, and Claire Mandle have both disappeared.

Armstrong kidnaps Senator Womersley, another Norman Club member. With Ed Drake's help, he interrogates Womersley using a device that forces him to tell the truth. Womersley reveals that Fothergill was killed on his orders and that Quinn is being held by Singleton, the leader of the Norman Club in Kansas City. The next two rockets are secretly being built at Yellowknife, Canada, and are nearly ready for test flights. Armstrong, Drake and Hansen go to Kansas City, where they find Lindle, Claire Mandle and Horowitz at Singleton's house. Drake, whose brother was killed when one of the sabotaged rockets exploded, forces Singleton to order that Quinn be brought to the house. A gun battle ensues in which Lindle, Singleton and Drake are killed. Claire had contacted the Norman Club to investigate Quinn's disappearance, and Horowitz, the Norman Club's mastermind, brought her to Kansas City.

Armstrong's party, now all wanted men, travel to Yellowknife, where Quinn and Armstrong commandeer the two rockets in the hope of defeating the Norman Club's purposes and averting world war by making a successful flight. Armstrong crashes in the Pacific Ocean, but Quinn lands safely on the Moon. The Norman Club, which was a fraud perpetrated by Horowitz and was not Martian in origin, is broken up, its purpose lost. General Gregory exonerates Quinn and Armstrong, who is reunited with Claire.

== Reception ==
Boucher and McComas gave the original edition of Dreadful Sanctuary a mixed review, praising "its vivid whodunit plotting and its magnificent concept," but castigating its "ridiculously anticlimactic ending". The New York Times reviewer Basil Davenport described the novel as "essentially a spy story, a good and exciting one, full of suspense." P. Schuyler Miller similarly described it as one of the few successful fusions of the detective novel with SF, saying it was "one of the most believable science-fiction books in years." Groff Conklin praised Dreadful Sanctuary as "Half brilliant imaginative science-detective-adventure story, half bitter and biting social satire". New Worlds found the story "chilling". John Clute called Dreadful Sanctuary "Russell's best novel" and added "it is told in a sparky style."

== Sources ==
- Chalker, Jack L.; Mark Owings (1998). The Science-Fantasy Publishers: A Bibliographic History, 1923-1998. Westminster, MD and Baltimore: Mirage Press, Ltd. p. 238.
- Tuck, Donald H. (1978). The Encyclopedia of Science Fiction and Fantasy. Chicago: Advent. pp. 373–374. ISBN 0-911682-22-8.
