= The Crystal Horde =

1952 novel by Eric Temple Bell

- Dust-jacket from the first edition
- Author: John Taine
- Cover artist: Hannes Bok
- Language: English
- Genre: Science fiction
- Publisher: Fantasy Press
- Publication date: 1952
- Publication place: United States
- Media type: Print (hardback)
- Pages: 254
- OCLC: 1295388

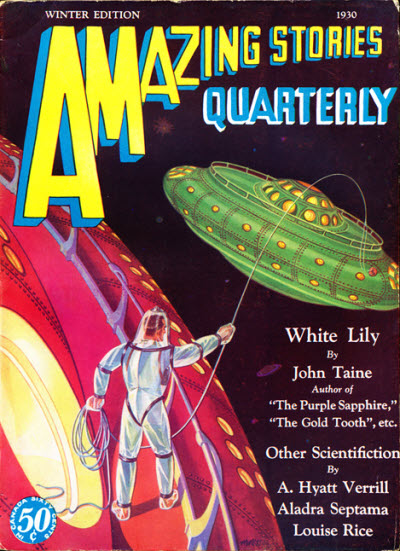
"White Lily" was originally published in the Winter 1930 Amazing Stories Quarterly.

The Crystal Horde is a science fiction novel by American writer John Taine (pseudonym of Eric Temple Bell). It was first published in book form in 1952 by Fantasy Press in an edition of 2,328 copies. The novel is substantially rewritten from a version that originally appeared in the magazine Amazing Stories Quarterly in 1930 under the title White Lily.

== Plot introduction ==
The novel is a science horror story that involves silicon crystalline lifeforms threatening to overwhelm carbon life on Earth.

== Reception ==
Groff Conklin, reviewing the 1952 edition, gave a mixed opinion; praising "one of the most magnificent science-horror ideas ever created," but ridiculing the plot as "probably the worst yellow-menace-plus-Bolsheviks-plus-religious-prejudice melange ever to hit science fiction." Boucher and McComas similarly found the novel an unsuccessful fusion of disparate elements, "a dull and involved story of Chinese warfare" and "some amusing satire and a dazzling series of descriptions.". P. Schuyler Miller, however, praised the story as among Taine's best, saying "the wildest of fancy, liberally laid on a solid scientific core."

Everett F. Bleiler reported that the opening sections regarding the outbreak of crystal life "have a certain fascination, despite the horrible writing," but the rest of the novel "is a jumble that never achieves conviction."

== Sources ==
- Chalker, Jack L.; Mark Owings (1998). The Science-Fantasy Publishers: A Bibliographic History, 1923-1998. Westminster, MD and Baltimore: Mirage Press, Ltd. p. 238.
- Clute, John; Peter Nicholls (1995). The Encyclopedia of Science Fiction. New York: St. Martin's Griffin. p. 1200. ISBN 0-312-13486-X.
- Tuck, Donald H. (1974). The Encyclopedia of Science Fiction and Fantasy. Chicago: Advent. p. 36. ISBN 0-911682-20-1.
