= Fantasy Press =

Defunct American publisher

- Status: Defunct
- Founded: 1946
- Founder: Lloyd Arthur Eshbach
- Successor: Gnome Press
- Country of origin: United States
- Headquarters location: Reading, Pennsylvania
- Publication types: Books
- Fiction genres: fantasy and science fiction

Fantasy Press was an American publishing house specialising in fantasy and science fiction titles. Established in 1946 by Lloyd Arthur Eshbach in Reading, Pennsylvania, it was most notable for publishing the works of authors such as Robert A. Heinlein and E. E. Smith. One of its more notable offerings was the Lensman series.

Among its books was Of Worlds Beyond: The Science of Science Fiction Writing (1947), which was the first book about modern SF and contained essays by John W. Campbell, Jr., Robert A. Heinlein, A. E. van Vogt and others.

== History ==
Lloyd Arthur Eshbach ordered a copy of Skylark of Space from its publisher, the Buffalo Book Company, in 1945 or 1946. Like many of Buffalo's customers, Eshbach was frustrated by Buffalo's delays in publishing and lack of marketing, an area that Eschbach had some expertise in, from his job as a copywriter for Glidden. He wrote to the Buffalo Book Company offering suggestions as to how they could better market their books. Thus started a correspondence between Eshbach and Tom Hadley, of Buffalo and later of the Hadley Publishing Company. Eshbach, who was working as an ad copywriter for the Glidden Company, did all of his work for Hadley as a gesture of good will with no payment. He withdrew when he saw that Hadley's ventures were going nowhere and customers were growing dissatisfied with the publisher.

While never an employee of Hadley, Eshbach helped him with his marketing efforts and as a result ended up with a copy of the mailing list of Hadley's customers. Eshbach jokingly suggested to several of his co-workers that they could probably do as well with a publishing company of their own, and to his surprise, the men agreed. With two of his co-workers from Glidden (A.J. Donnell as illustrator and Lyman H. Houck as bookkeeper) and one other friend of theirs (Herb MacGregor shipping the books), Eshbach used the mailing list to start Fantasy Press. He approached E. E. Smith to obtain the rights to Spacehounds of IPC. Smith was enthusiastic and Spacehounds of IPC became the first title published by the new press. Eshbach had seen the success of Hadley's poorly produced 'Skylark of Space and knew that a well done volume of E.E. Smith would probably be a strong seller. Spacehounds of IPC was extremely successful and sold several thousand copies. Eshbach immediately went out and got contracts for other books he thought would do well. Fantasy Press swiftly became the most successful and important of the fledgling science fiction small presses. Eshbach acquiring the stories, A.J. Donnell as illustrator, Lyman Houck (an accountant friend and fellow Mason) as bookkeeper, and Herb MacGregor shipping the books. Eshbach eventually bought out his partners and operated the press for several years on his own. Ultimately, Fantasy Press was under-capitalized and sales declined in the face of competition from the mainstream publishers. Eshbach wrote his authors and reverted the rights to their books while he took a job with a religious publishing house in Myerstown, Pennsylvania.

=== Publication standards ===
Good titles were not the only thing going for Eshbach. He knew how to produce an attractive book and did so. All of the Fantasy Press books featured attractive bindings and dustjackets. The paper was of good quality and the typeface was clear and readable. Eshbach believed in illustrated books and all of his publications featured interior illustrations. At first, most of the art was done by A.J. Donnell, one of the founders of the company, but after a few years, Eshbach began using popular science fiction magazine artists as well....Eshbach was an intelligent businessman and knew how to produce a book that would sell. His choices for publication were well thought out. In a brilliant stroke, he contracted for the entire Lensman series by E. E. Smith. Smith completely revised an early non-related novel, Triplanetary, into the introductory novel of the series. He then wrote an entirely new novel, First Lensman, to tie the first novel in with the four adventures of Kimball Kinneson which had originally made up the rest of the series. The six Lensman books were among the best selling of all the Fantasy Press titles.

Lloyd Eshbach established many features for his Fantasy Press that are accepted today as commonplace by collectors of specialty press books. As a way of generating pre-publication capital for new titles, Eshbach hatched the idea of offering special signed editions to those who placed pre-publication orders for new books through the mail. These special editions contained a "limitation leaf" - a page bound or tipped in after the title page - stating that only so many copies of a given book were numbered and signed by the book's author, along with an inscription by or signature of the author as a reward for ordering. Many fans that ordered multiple books from the same author found themselves receiving warm inscriptions as the writer came to know them by name. The normal press run for a Fantasy Press title was about 3,000 copies; in each edition anywhere from 250 to 500 copies would contain the limitation leaf. Today, these signed editions fetch two to four times (or more in the case of authors like Robert Heinlein) the value of an unsigned edition, and are highly sought after by collectors. And the practice of the limited/signed edition is a standard offering among specialty publishers today.

=== Later years and demise ===
Fantasy Press folded after 1955, a victim of the glut of science fiction books and magazines on the market by that time. What had been a relatively empty playing field in 1946 or 1947, when many of the fan publishers began operations, had become by the mid-1950s a free-for-all, as the mainstream book publishers, seeing the initial successes of the specialty houses, jumped into the fray full-force, bringing with them considerable capitalization and extensive distribution networks with which the fan publishers could scarcely compete. This period also saw the rise of inexpensive paperback publishing, with titles often becoming available in paperback at one-tenth the price of a hardcover, before the specialty house had time to sell out its own edition. Readers became wise to the fact that if they just waited for six months or a year before buying, they could get the book in paperback on the cheap. The collector's market by itself was simply not large enough at that time to support the specialty presses without general reader sales added in. This era heralded the fall of the "big three" science fiction specialty houses - Fantasy Press, Gnome Press, and Shasta Publishers, although Gnome and Shasta managed to hang on for a few years more by sheer force of will. Eshbach knew when to call it quits before the house totally burned to the ground, and reverted rights for all of his books to his authors - as he had no money to pay them with - and formally retreated from the stage of fan publishing. In 1955, Fantasy Press bombed with Under the Triple Suns, a new novel by Stanton Coblentz.

Never one to give in completely, Eshbach continued to experiment whenever his funding allowed. In 1956 he took 500 sets of the remaining unbound sheets for three of his titles and had them bound in paper covers as part of the Fantasy Press "Golden Science Fiction Library", which he then marketed (mostly at conventions) for $1.00 apiece. And, as a favor to Martin Greenberg over at Gnome Press, Eshbach utilized his position as director of the Church Center Press in 1961 to assist in the production of two of the last Gnome Press titles, Invaders from the Infinite, by John W. Campbell, Jr., and The Vortex Blaster, by Edward E. Smith - both titles which Eshbach had held the rights to but had transferred to Gnome. As part of his agreement with Greenberg, Eshbach also produced a limited run (about one hundred copies of the Campbell book, and 300 of the Smith) of each title on better-quality book paper under the Fantasy Press logo, which have since become among the most sought-after titles in the Fantasy Press line.

Eshbach had remaining in storage as much as 20,000 unbound sheets for nearly every one of his company's 46 titles (excluding Polaris Press). He sold small quantities of these to Martin Greenberg over at Gnome Press, which Greenberg cheaply bound and sold through his Pick-A-Book operation. But the bulk of these sheets were sold to Donald M. Grant, himself a publisher of mostly fantasy books, who bound quantities of each of them for sale. As the bindings used by both Grant and Greenberg were in most cases different from the originals, this practice created a bewildering number of "variants" that sometimes have collectors today shaking their heads. Grant was still finding unbound sheets in his warehouse twenty years later and binding them for sale, so it was not unusual to see "brand new" copies of Fantasy Press books for sale into the mid and even late 1980s, as much as thirty years after the company had ceased operations. Eshbach also sold Grant a fair quantity of flat dust jackets for Fantasy Press books, some of which are still available on the collector's market today.

== Imprints ==
Polaris Press was a subsidiary imprint of Fantasy Press that was created in 1952. Eschbach created the imprint in order to publish books he felt did not quite fit under the Fantasy Press imprint. Ultimately, only two titles were ever issued under the Polaris Press imprint.

== Works published by Fantasy Press ==
- Spacehounds of IPC, by Edward E. Smith, Ph.D. (1947)
- The Legion of Space, by Jack Williamson (1947)
- The Forbidden Garden, by John Taine (1947)
- Of Worlds Beyond, edited by Lloyd Arthur Eshbach (1947)
- The Book of Ptath, by A. E. van Vogt (1947)
- The Black Flame, by Stanley G. Weinbaum (1948)
- Triplanetary, by Edward E. Smith, Ph.D. (1948)
- Beyond This Horizon, by Robert A. Heinlein (1948)
- Sinister Barrier, by Eric Frank Russell (1948)
- Skylark Three, by Edward E. Smith, Ph.D. (1948)
- Divide and Rule & The Stolen Dormouse, by L. Sprague de Camp (1948)
- Darker Than You Think, by Jack Williamson (1948)
- Skylark of Valeron, by Edward E. Smith, Ph.D. (1949)
- A Martian Odyssey and Others, by Stanley G. Weinbaum (1949)
- Seven Out of Time, by Arthur Leo Zagat (1949)
- The Incredible Planet, by John W. Campbell, Jr. (1949)
- First Lensman, by Edward E. Smith, Ph.D. (1950)
- Masters of Time, by A. E. van Vogt (1950)
- The Bridge of Light, by A. Hyatt Verrill (1950)
- Genus Homo, by L. Sprague de Camp and P. Schuyler Miller (1950)
- The Cometeers, by Jack Williamson (1950)
- Galactic Patrol, by Edward E. Smith, Ph.D. (1950)
- The Moon is Hell, by John W. Campbell, Jr. (1950)
- Dreadful Sanctuary, by Eric Frank Russell (1951)
- Beyond Infinity, by Robert Spencer Carr (1951)
- Seeds of Life, by John Taine (1951)
- Gray Lensman, by Edward E. Smith, Ph.D. (1951)
- The Crystal Horde, by John Taine (1952)
- The Red Peri, by Stanley G. Weinbaum (1952)
- The Legion of Time, by Jack Williamson (1952)
- The Titan, by P. Schuyler Miller (1952)
- Second Stage Lensmen, by Edward E. Smith, Ph.D. (1953)
- The Black Star Passes, by John W. Campbell, Jr. (1953)
- Man of Many Minds, by E. Everett Evans (1953)
- Assignment in Eternity, by Robert A. Heinlein (1953)
- Deep Space, by Eric Frank Russell (1954)
- Three Thousand Years, by Thomas Calvert McClary (1954)
- Children of the Lens, by Edward E. Smith, Ph.D. (1954)
- Operation: Outer Space, by Murray Leinster (1954)
- G.O.G. 666, by John Taine (1954)
- The Tyrant of Time, by Lloyd Arthur Eshbach (1955)
- Under the Triple Suns, by Stanton A. Coblentz (1955)
- Alien Minds, by E. Everett Evans (1955)
- Islands of Space, by John W. Campbell, Jr. (1957)
- The Vortex Blaster, by Edward E. Smith, Ph.D. (1960)
- Invaders from the Infinite, by John W. Campbell, Jr. (1961)
- The History of Civilization, by Edward E. Smith, Ph.D. (1961)

== Works published by Polaris Press ==
- The Heads of Cerberus, by Francis Stevens (1952)
- The Abyss of Wonders, by Perley Poore Sheehan (1953)
