= The Legion of Time =

Book by Jack Williamson

- Dust-jacket from the first edition
- Author: Jack Williamson
- Cover artist: Richard Angerman
- Language: English
- Genre: Science fiction
- Publisher: Fantasy Press
- Publication date: 1952
- Publication place: United States
- Media type: Print (hardback)
- Pages: 252

The Legion of Time is a novella by the American writer Jack Williamson. It was originally serialized (in three installments) in Astounding Science-Fiction from May to July 1938, and was subsequently reissued by Fantasy Press (along with another novella (from Marvel Stories), in a 1952 edition of 4,604 copies. Despite the title Legion of Time, the stories do not in fact feature an organization with such a name. The title story was originally announced as "The Legion of Probability".

== Contents ==
- The Legion of Time
- After World's End

== Reception ==
Boucher and McComas praised the title story for its "fine swashbuckling and much ingenious speculation", but found the other story far inferior. Aldiss and Wingrove, comparing The Legion of Time to a fairy tale, declared that "its plot, while being philosophically meaningless, is a delight."

In 2014, the novel was nominated for a Retro-Hugo Award.

== See also ==
- Jonbar hinge

== Sources ==
- Chalker, Jack L.; Mark Owings (1998). The Science-Fantasy Publishers: A Bibliographic History, 1923-1998. Westminster, MD and Baltimore: Mirage Press, Ltd. p. 238.
- Tuck, Donald H. (1978). The Encyclopedia of Science Fiction and Fantasy. Chicago: Advent. p. 462. ISBN 0-911682-22-8.
