= The Iron Star =

1930 novel by Eric Temple Bell

- Dust-jacket from the first edition
- Author: John Taine
- Language: English
- Genre: Science fiction
- Publisher: E. P. Dutton
- Publication date: 1930
- Publication place: United States
- Media type: Print (Hardback)
- Pages: 356
- OCLC: 1967264

The Iron Star is a science fiction novel by American writer John Taine (pseudonym of Eric Temple Bell). It was first published in 1930 by E. P. Dutton.

== Plot introduction ==
The novel concerns an African expedition. Swain, a member of the expedition, becomes demented and attempts to exterminate a peculiar species of African ape. The other members of the expedition are befriended by an intelligent ape called the Captain. The expedition discovers that the apes are in fact humans that have evolved in reverse due to exposure to a meteor and that the Captain was once human.

== Reception ==
One newspaper review of the original edition described The Iron Star as "a fantastic thriller along unusual lines, clever and well done, but with a repulsive theme."

Boucher and McComas faulted the novel as "poorly written," but characterized the central idea as "curious and effective.". P. Schuyler Miller, however, rated the novel as "Taine's greatest book, and one of the greatest in all science fiction"; he praised its "daring scientific concept" and its "perplexing mystery," as well as "a smoothness which none of [Taine's] other books quite show."

Everett F. Bleiler reported that "The idea is interesting, despite Taine's ignorance of zoology and his shocking racial intolerance," but that "the literary development is fumbling."

== Sources ==
- Chalker, Jack L.; Mark Owings (1998). The Science-Fantasy Publishers: A Bibliographic History, 1923-1998. Westminster, MD and Baltimore: Mirage Press, Ltd. p. 271.
- Crawford, Jr., Joseph H.; James J. Donahue; Donald M. Grant (1953). "333", A Bibliography of the Science-Fantasy Novel. Providence, RI: The Grandon Company. p. 63. OCLC 3924496.
- Tuck, Donald H. (1974). The Encyclopedia of Science Fiction and Fantasy. Chicago: Advent. p. 36. ISBN 0-911682-20-1.
