= Three Thousand Years =

1954 novel by Thomas Calvert McClary

- Dust-jacket from the first edition
- Author: Thomas Calvert McClary
- Cover artist: Hannes Bok
- Language: English
- Genre: Science fiction
- Publisher: Fantasy Press
- Publication date: 1954
- Publication place: United States
- Media type: Print (Hardback)
- Pages: 224
- OCLC: 1137186

Three Thousand Years is a science fiction novel by American writer Thomas Calvert McClary. It was first published in book form in 1954 by Fantasy Press in an edition of 1,454 copies. Originally serialized in the magazine Astounding SF in 1938, the novel rewritten for its book release.

The novel concerns scientists who attempt to build a utopia after the Earth has been placed in suspended animation for 3,000 years.

== Reception ==
Anthony Boucher panned the novel, finding it "inept, improbable, and crudely written." P. Schuyler Miller described the novel as "crude [but] not so archaic as you might suppose."

== Sources ==
- Chalker, Jack L.; Mark Owings (1998). The Science-Fantasy Publishers: A Bibliographic History, 1923-1998. Westminster, MD and Baltimore: Mirage Press, Ltd. p. 239.
- Clute, John; Peter Nicholls (1995). The Encyclopedia of Science Fiction. New York: St. Martin's Griffin. pp. 748–749. ISBN 0-312-13486-X.
- Tuck, Donald H. (1978). The Encyclopedia of Science Fiction and Fantasy. Chicago: Advent. p. 287. ISBN 0-911682-22-8.
