= Man of Many Minds =

1953 novel by E. Everett Evans

- Dust-jacket from the first edition
- Author: E. Everett Evans
- Cover artist: Mel Hunter
- Language: English
- Series: George Hanlan
- Genre: Science fiction
- Publisher: Fantasy Press
- Publication date: 1953
- Publication place: United States
- Media type: Print (Hardback)
- Pages: 222
- OCLC: 1686182
- Followed by: Alien Minds

Man of Many Minds is a science fiction novel by American writer E. Everett Evans. It was first published in 1953 by Fantasy Press in an edition of 3,558 copies. The book includes an introduction by E. E. Smith.

== Plot introduction ==
The novel concerns the adventures of George Hanlon, a secret service agent who has the ability to read minds.

== Reception ==
P. Schuyler Miller gave the novel a negative review, saying "it won't stand up" against then-contemporary standards, though it might have been successful years earlier.

== Sources ==
- Chalker, Jack L.; Mark Owings (1998). The Science-Fantasy Publishers: A Bibliographic History, 1923-1998. Westminster, MD and Baltimore: Mirage Press, Ltd. p. 239.
- Clute, John; Peter Nicholls (1995). The Encyclopedia of Science Fiction. New York: St. Martin's Griffin. p. 393. ISBN 0-312-13486-X.
- Tuck, Donald H. (1974). The Encyclopedia of Science Fiction and Fantasy. Chicago: Advent. pp. 160–161. ISBN 0-911682-20-1.
