= The Titan (collection) =

- Dust-jacket from the first edition
- Author: P. Schuyler Miller
- Cover artist: Hannes Bok
- Language: English
- Genre: Science fiction
- Publisher: Fantasy Press
- Publication date: 1952
- Publication place: United States
- Media type: Print (hardback)
- Pages: 252 pp

The Titan is a collection of science fiction short stories by the American writer P. Schuyler Miller. It was first published by Fantasy Press in 1952 in an edition of 2,069 copies. The stories originally appeared in the magazines Marvel Tales, Astounding, Weird Tales, Amazing Stories and Wonder Stories. Miller recreated and revised the title piece (whose serialization was never finished) from an early longhand draft because the original manuscript had been lost.

== Contents ==
- "The Titan"
- "As Never Was"
- "Old Man Mulligan"
- "Spawn"
- "In the Good Old Summertime"
- "Gleeps"
- "The Arrhenius Horror"
- "Forgotten"

== Reception ==
Boucher and McComas gave the collection a mixed review, saying that it included little of Miller's best work, with the remaining stories "a mixed lot in which striking ideas conflict with treatment that is sadly routine."

== Sources ==
- Chalker, Jack L.; Mark Owings (1998). The Science-Fantasy Publishers: A Bibliographic History, 1923-1998. Westminster, MD and Baltimore: Mirage Press, Ltd. pp. 238–239.
- Contento, William G. "Index to Science Fiction Anthologies and Collections".
- Tuck, Donald H. (1978). The Encyclopedia of Science Fiction and Fantasy. Chicago: Advent. p. 312. ISBN 0-911682-22-8.
