= Seeds of Life =

1951 novel by Eric Temple Bell

- Dust-jacket from the first edition
- Author: John Taine
- Cover artist: Ric Binkley
- Language: English
- Genre: Science fiction
- Publisher: Fantasy Press
- Publication date: 1951
- Publication place: United States
- Media type: Print (hardback)
- Pages: 255
- OCLC: 1621852

Seeds of Life is a science fiction novel by American writer John Taine (pseudonym of Eric Temple Bell). It was first published in 1951 by Fantasy Press in an edition of 2,991 copies. The novel originally appeared in the magazine Amazing Stories Quarterly in October 1931.

== Plot introduction ==
The novel concerns the creation of a superman using radiation.

== Reception ==
Reviewing the 1951 edition, Groff Conklin praised the novel as "a superb tale" despite "a style that can only be forgiven because of its age (1931) and characterization and a plot that can hardly be forgiven at all." Also writing in 1951, Boucher and McComas noted that "even today it can still compete as one of the better treatments" of its theme. P. Schuyler Miller found the novel "top notch . . . full of the outrageously daring flights of the imagination which are the Taine trademark" as well as "plenty of the biting satire which we can also expect of a Taine book." New York Times reviewer Basil Davenport criticized the novel for its dubious science and "lack of a single clear narrative line," saying the novel "appeals only to the nerves."

Everett F. Bleiler found the opening segment of the novel to be "fascinating," but that as a whole "it suffers from formal defects, inadequate development at times, superfluity at others, weak characterizations, and problems with tone." Still, he concluded, "the novel is well worth reading for its virtues."

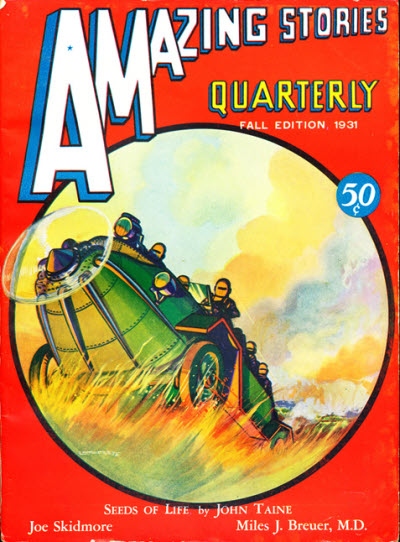
Seeds of Life was originally published in the Fall 1931 Amazing Stories Quarterly

== Sources ==
- Chalker, Jack L.; Mark Owings (1998). The Science-Fantasy Publishers: A Bibliographic History, 1923-1998. Westminster, MD and Baltimore: Mirage Press, Ltd. p. 238.
- Tuck, Donald H. (1974). The Encyclopedia of Science Fiction and Fantasy. Chicago: Advent. p. 36. ISBN 0-911682-20-1.
