= Under the Triple Suns =

1955 novel by Stanton A. Coblentz

- Dust-jacket from the first edition
- Author: Stanton A. Coblentz
- Cover artist: Hannes Bok
- Language: English
- Genre: Science fiction
- Publisher: Fantasy Press
- Publication date: 1955
- Publication place: United States
- Media type: Print (hardback)
- Pages: 224
- OCLC: 2885452

Under the Triple Suns is a science fiction novel by American writer Stanton A. Coblentz. It was first published in 1955 by Fantasy Press in an edition of 1,528 copies.

== Plot introduction ==
The novel concerns the survivors of the destruction of the earth and their attempt at settling a new planet.

== Reception ==
Galaxy reviewer Groff Conklin panned the novel, saying "it has nothing new or even interesting to offer." Anthony Boucher found the novel "sounds exactly like one of [Coblentz's] first science-fantasies back in 1928 . . . tinged with some amusing topsy-turvy satire." P. Schuyler Miller found the novel marked by "heavy-handed satire" that "bludgeoned" the reader.

== Sources ==
- Chalker, Jack L.; Mark Owings (1998). The Science-Fantasy Publishers: A Bibliographic History, 1923-1998. Westminster, MD and Baltimore: Mirage Press, Ltd. p. 240.
- Clute, John; Peter Nicholls (1995). The Encyclopedia of Science Fiction. New York: St. Martin's Griffin. p. 240. ISBN 0-312-13486-X.
- Tuck, Donald H. (1974). The Encyclopedia of Science Fiction and Fantasy. Chicago: Advent. p. 106. ISBN 0-911682-20-1.
