= Tyrant of Time =

1955 collection of science-fiction short stories by Lloyd Arthur Eshbach

The Tyrant of Time
- Dust-jacket from the first edition
- Author: Lloyd Arthur Eshbach
- Cover artist: Ric Binkley
- Language: English
- Genre: Science fiction
- Publisher: Fantasy Press
- Publication date: 1955
- Publication place: United States
- Media type: Print (hardback)
- Pages: 255 pp
- OCLC: 1295464

The Tyrant of Time is a collection of science fiction short stories by the American writer Lloyd Arthur Eshbach. It was first published by Fantasy Press in 1955 in an edition of 1,547 copies. Most of the stories originally appeared in the magazines Wonder Stories, Amazing Stories, Thrilling Wonder Stories, Science Fiction and Strange Stories.

== Contents ==
- "The Tyrant of Time"
- "The Meteor Miners"
- "Spaceways Incident"
- "The Light from Beyond"
- "The Place of Orchids"
- "The City of Dread"
- "Singing Blades"
- "The Cauldron of Life"

== Reception ==
Reviewer Groff Conklin panned the collection as "another of those stones that should have been left unturned," saying that "The ideas no longer have any originality and the style is an almost perfect example of the early days of science fiction." Anthony Boucher agreed, declaring that "your opinion of Mr. Eshbach will remain higher if you fail to read [these] 9 unfortunate stories." P. Schuyler Miller described the stories as typical of their period, "pretty fair ideas, but amateurishly handled." Writing in The New York Times, Villiers Gerson found the stories to be standard 1930s fare, "one-dimensional and more concerned with the gimmick than with the characters."

== Sources ==
- Chalker, Jack L.; Mark Owings (1998). The Science-Fantasy Publishers: A Bibliographic History, 1923-1998. Westminster, MD and Baltimore: Mirage Press, Ltd. p. 240.
- Contento, William G. "Index to Science Fiction Anthologies and Collections".
- Tuck, Donald H. (1974). The Encyclopedia of Science Fiction and Fantasy. Chicago: Advent. p. 160. ISBN 0-911682-20-1.
