= Seven Out of Time =

1949 novel by Arthur Leo Zagat

Seven out of Time
- Dust-jacket from the first edition
- Author: Arthur Leo Zagat
- Illustrator: Hannes Bok
- Cover artist: A. J. Donnell
- Language: English
- Genre: Science fiction
- Publisher: Fantasy Press
- Publication date: 1949
- Publication place: United States
- Media type: Print (hardback)
- Pages: 240
- OCLC: 2750099

Seven out of Time is a science fiction novel by American writer Arthur Leo Zagat. It was originally serialized in the magazine Argosy beginning in 1939. It was first published in book form in 1949 by Fantasy Press in an edition of 2,612 copies.

== Plot summary ==
The novel is written as a first-person narrative, the narrator being a young attorney from New York named John March. While investigating the disappearance of Evelyn Rand, a young heiress, March is transported across time and space. He finds himself on a strange world which is inhabited by bizarre tentacled creatures who claim to be the descendants of the human race. There he finds Evelyn Rand, abducted as he was, and the two fall in love.

Also present are many historical people who disappeared mysteriously, including the poet François Villon, King Arthur, the lost Dauphin, John Orth of Austria, and the Prophet Elijah. The seven band together to confront their captors, demanding to know why they are there. Two chapters are devoted to an exposition of the history of the human race in evolutionary terms. Despite their technological prowess, the "future men" have lost certain human qualities – including love, loyalty and faith – which they now believe vital to their survival. They will stop at nothing to wrest these "secrets" from their abductees. Horrified by their inhumanity and ruthlessness, the seven vow to stop them at any cost.

As the creatures suffer an attack by mindless monsters which they themselves created, John March and Evelyn Rand are transported back to 20th-century America. March decides to publish a record of their experiences in the hope of changing the direction of human civilization.

== Sources ==
- Chalker, Jack L.; Mark Owings (1998). The Science-Fantasy Publishers: A Bibliographic History, 1923-1998. Westminster, MD and Baltimore: Mirage Press, Ltd. p. 236.
- Tuck, Donald H. (1978). The Encyclopedia of Science Fiction and Fantasy. Chicago: Advent. p. 473. ISBN 0-911682-22-8.
