= Masters of Time =

Book by A.E. van Vogt

- Dust-jacket from the first edition
- Author: A. E. van Vogt
- Illustrator: Edd Cartier
- Cover artist: Edd Cartier
- Language: English
- Genre: Science fiction
- Publisher: Fantasy Press
- Publication date: 1950
- Publication place: United States
- Media type: Print (hardback)
- Pages: 227
- OCLC: 676182

Masters of Time is a collection of two science fiction novellas by A. E. van Vogt. It was first published in 1950 by Fantasy Press in an edition of 4,034 copies. It contains the unrelated novellas "Recruiting Station" (here retitled "Masters of Time") and "The Changeling". The latter features a recurring character of van Vogt's called Pendrake. Both works of fiction originally appeared in the magazine Astounding SF. More confusingly, the title novella has also appeared on the third title of "Earth's Last Fortress".

== Sources ==
- Chalker, Jack L.; Mark Owings (1998). The Science-Fantasy Publishers: A Bibliographic History, 1923-1998. Westminster, MD and Baltimore: Mirage Press, Ltd. p. 237.
- Contento, William G. "Index to Science Fiction Anthologies and Collections". Archived from the original on 2016-03-08.
- Tuck, Donald H. (1978). The Encyclopedia of Science Fiction and Fantasy. Chicago: Advent. p. 431. ISBN 0-911682-22-8.
