= Green Fire (novel) =

1928 novel by Eric Temple Bell

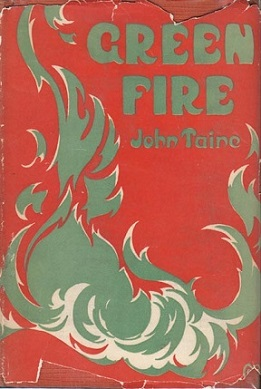
- Dust-jacket from the first edition
- Author: John Taine
- Language: English
- Genre: Science fiction
- Publisher: E. P. Dutton
- Publication date: 1928
- Publication place: United States
- Media type: Print (Hardback)
- Pages: 313
- OCLC: 2019311

Green Fire is a science fiction novel by American writer John Taine (pseudonym of Eric Temple Bell). It was first published in 1928 by E. P. Dutton. The novel was adapted and produced as a play.

== Plot introduction ==
The novel concerns two corporations competing to develop the power of atomic energy. Independent Laboratories is working for the advancement of mankind, and Consolidated Power is working for personal gain. Nature goes berserk, and James Ferguson, the leader of Independent, discovers that Jevic, the Director of Consolidated, has achieved his goal.

Nebulae in space are marked with a greenish glow and then are obliterated. MacRobert, who has previously refused offers from either corporation, is placed in charge of Independent. He disposes of Jevic in time to end the destruction.

== Reception ==
Basil Davenport, reviewing the novel for The New York Times, faulted the story's "psychological crudities," but noted that Green Fire was also marked by "some striking concepts, and a duel of powers with real suspense."

Everett F. Bleiler faulted the novel for defects including "poor exposition," noted that Jevic was modeled on Nikola Tesla, and found the fictionalized account of his early life "fascinating."

== Sources ==
- Chalker, Jack L.; Mark Owings (1998). The Science-Fantasy Publishers: A Bibliographic History, 1923-1998. Westminster, MD and Baltimore: Mirage Press, Ltd. p. 271.
- Crawford, Jr., Joseph H.; James J. Donahue; Donald M. Grant (1953). "333", A Bibliography of the Science-Fantasy Novel. Providence, RI: The Grandon Company. pp. 62–63. OCLC 3924496.
- Tuck, Donald H. (1974). The Encyclopedia of Science Fiction and Fantasy. Chicago: Advent. p. 36. ISBN 0-911682-20-1.
