= Alien Minds =

1955 novel by E. Everett Evans

- Dust-jacket from the first edition
- Author: E. Everett Evans
- Cover artist: Hannes Bok
- Language: English
- Series: George Hanlan
- Genre: Science fiction
- Publisher: Fantasy Press
- Publication date: 1955
- Publication place: United States
- Media type: Print (hardback)
- Pages: 223
- OCLC: 1293434
- Preceded by: Man of Many Minds

Alien Minds is a science fiction novel by American writer E. Everett Evans. It was first published in 1955 by Fantasy Press in an edition of 1,417 copies. The book is a sequel to Man of Many Minds

== Plot summary ==
The novel concerns the adventures of George Hanlan, a secret service agent who has the ability to read minds, on the planet Estrella.

== Sources ==
- Chalker, Jack L.; Mark Owings (1998). The Science-Fantasy Publishers: A Bibliographic History, 1923-1998. Westminster, MD and Baltimore: Mirage Press, Ltd. p. 240.
- Clute, John; Peter Nicholls (1995). The Encyclopedia of Science Fiction. New York: St. Martin's Griffin. p. 393. ISBN 0-312-13486-X.
- Tuck, Donald H. (1974). The Encyclopedia of Science Fiction and Fantasy. Chicago: Advent. p. 160. ISBN 0-911682-20-1.
