= Sinister Barrier =

1939 novel by Eric Frank Russell

- Dust-jacket from the first edition
- Author: Eric Frank Russell
- Language: English
- Genre: Science fiction
- Publisher: The World's Work, Ltd.
- Publication date: 1943
- Publication place: United Kingdom
- Media type: Print (Hardback)
- Pages: 135
- OCLC: 81034269

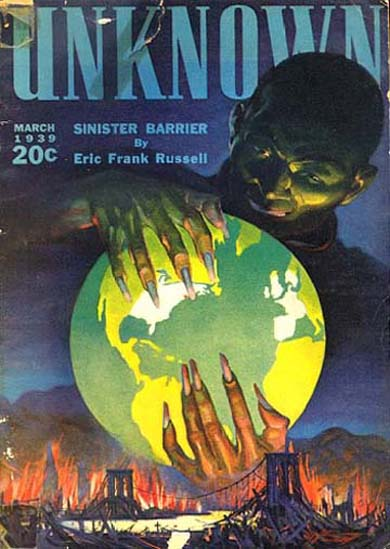
The magazine version of Sinister Barrier was the cover story for Unknown No. 1 (1939-03)

Sinister Barrier is an English-language science fiction novel by British writer Eric Frank Russell. The novel originally appeared in the magazine Unknown in 1939, the first novel to appear in its pages. It was first published in book form in 1943 by The World's Work, Ltd. Russell revised and expanded the book for its first US publication by Fantasy Press in 1948. Most subsequent editions were based on the Fantasy Press version.

== Underlying premise ==
Russell used the ideas of Charles Fort, whom he described as "a sort of Peter Pan of science", including many of Fort’s findings in the story. In particular, he employed the idea that we humans are property of some more highly evolved beings that live in a realm that we cannot see. Those invisible beings are immaterial: they are made of energy and Russell compares them to ball lightning. How could we ever hope to revolt against such beings? Therein lies a story.

== Plot ==
"Swift death awaits the first cow that leads a revolt against milking," wrote Swedish Professor Peder Bjornsen just before he died of a heart attack in May 2015. Bill Graham, investigating the deaths of two scientists his agency has funded, discovers that over a dozen scientists who knew each other have died recently, either by heart attack or by suicide, after appearing to go insane. With the aid of police lieutenant Art Wohl, Graham searches out other scientists who knew the men in the group and finds that they are dying as well. He finally meets a scientist who explains what has been happening.

Professor Bjornsen had discovered a means of extending human vision into the far infrared and he discovered that the world is occupied by meter-wide spheres that appear pale blue in his new vision. The spheres, which he called Vitons, are sentient and mildly telepathic (they can read people’s minds if they get close enough); they also feed on the electrochemical energy of human emotions. If a Viton sucks too hard on a human nervous system, it causes a fatal heart attack, which is how the Vitons have been killing the scientists, in order to prevent humanity from learning of their existence.

That knowledge, including Professor Bjornsen’s formula, is quickly spread around the world. The Vitons react by triggering an all-out world war. They enjoy a world-wide feeding frenzy as they work to regain control over their “cattle”. Chased into a hospital by a pair of Vitons, Graham and Wohl discover that the phantom vampires shy away from a machine that emits short-wave radio energy.

Given that information, researchers all over the world struggle to find a form of radio transmission that will kill Vitons. Graham continues to seek out clues, obtaining them from people that the Vitons kill. Eventually he gets the necessary information and a ray gun, built like an anti-aircraft gun, is set up and tested. Graham destroys dozens of Vitons before the gun is destroyed and he is nearly killed. All relevant information on the gun has been widely disseminated and more guns are built and put to use. Seeing Vitons being destroyed, people sober up and the war winds down. There is a huge mess to clean up and plenty more Vitons to kill, but humanity will prevail.

== Title ==
On pg 63 of the 1966 Paperback Library edition Russell has one of his characters say:

The scale of electro-magnetic vibrations extends over sixty octaves, of which the human eye can see but one. Beyond that sinister barrier of our limitations, outside that poor, ineffective range of vision, bossing every man jack of us from the cradle to the grave, invisibly preying on us as ruthlessly as any parasite, are our malicious, all-powerful lords and masters – the creatures who really own the Earth!

== Reception ==
Fletcher Pratt, writing in The New York Times, found Sinister Barrier to be a standard adventure story with a scientific background, which moves too fast to let anyone look too closely at parts of the structure." Astounding reviewer P. Schuyler Miller praised the novel as "a fast-moving adventure in which punch follows punch from beginning to end." Miller reported that Russell had made more effective use of the ideas of Charles Fort than almost any other author. In Astounding: John W. Campbell, Isaac Asimov, Robert A. Heinlein, L. Ron Hubbard, and the Golden Age of Science Fiction, author Alec Nevala-Lee says it "deserves to be ranked as one of the greatest science fiction novels ever written".

Dave Langford reviewed Sinister Barrier for White Dwarf #76, and stated that "SF based on Charles Fort's offbeat speculations. 'I think we're property,' said Fort. Russell translated this into nasty energy beasts who herd us like sheep, and chronicled the results when the facts leak out. Painfully dated, but a must for the collector's library."

South Korean writer Djuna cited the work as one that has significantly influenced them in their youth, at the same time noting that "It hasn’t aged well, and it’s particularly criticized for its racist depiction of Asians".

== Sources ==
- Brown, Charles N.; William G. Contento. "The Locus Index to Science Fiction (1984-1998)".
- Chalker, Jack L.; Mark Owings (1998). The Science-Fantasy Publishers: A Bibliographic History, 1923-1998. Westminster, MD and Baltimore: Mirage Press, Ltd. p. 236.
- Clute, John; Peter Nicholls (1995). The Encyclopedia of Science Fiction. New York: St. Martin's Griffin. p. 1036. ISBN 0-312-13486-X.
- Tuck, Donald H. (1978). The Encyclopedia of Science Fiction and Fantasy. Chicago: Advent. p. 374. ISBN 0-911682-22-8.
