= Darker Than You Think =

1948 novel by Jack Williamson

- Cover of first edition.
- Author: Jack Williamson
- Illustrator: Edd Cartier
- Cover artist: A. J. Donnell
- Language: English
- Genre: Horror, science fantasy
- Publisher: Fantasy Press
- Publication date: 1948 (novel version)
- Publication place: United States
- Media type: Print (hardback)
- Pages: 310
- OCLC: 1126271

Darker Than You Think is a science fantasy and horror novel by American writer Jack Williamson. Originally a novelette, it was expanded into novel length and published by Fantasy Press in 1948. The short version was published in Unknown in 1940.

== Plot ==
The novel begins with the announcement from an ethnological expedition to Mongolia that among humanity exist people who can turn themselves into animals. However, the expedition's spokesman dies of a sudden mysterious seizure in the midst of a press conference, just as he was about to provide detailed proof of his assertions. His friend, journalist Will Barbee, suspects his alleged colleague, the fascinating April Bell.

Determined to discover the truth, but also attracted by Bell, Barbee finds out that in a past era a war took place in which Homo sapiens defeated werewolves (Homo lycanthropus) – who can, in fact, also turn themselves into a variety of animals other than wolves. The surviving werewolves continued to live hidden among humans and await the coming of the Child of the Night who will lead them to recover their supremacy.

In the secret history depicted in the book, medieval witch hunting was not a manifestation of blind fanaticism but a means of protecting Homo sapiens against the resurgence of this very real threat; conversely, modern skepticism and rational disbelief in the very existence of witches were deliberately fostered by these hidden werewolves, as a way of gaining a breathing spell and preparing for their counter-attack.

While becoming aware of all this, Barbee is faced with the issue of discovering precisely who and what he is himself, and on which side he should range himself in the coming titanic struggle.

== Reception ==
Astounding's reviewer Catherine Crook de Camp praised the novel as an "outstanding fantasy [with] excellent plot design, fast-moving action, and suspense which explodes into high-tension horror."

Brian W. Aldiss and David Wingrove chose Darker Than You Think as "Williamson's best novel," declaring that "it is well worked out, full of genuine suspense and excitement, and primed with a good hefty sense of evil. The characters, though obvious, are clearly drawn, but the major advantage of the novel is that is full of the pleasure of wild life, of running free in the dark, of the forests, the mountainside, and of the scents of the breeze."

R. D. Mullen described the novel as "Williamson's first serious effort to transcend the limitations of pulp fiction" and noted that it, like contemporaneous mainstream novels, "combines the fantasies of our darker superstitions with the revelations of psychoanalysis."

Robert Weinberg included Darker Than You Think on his list of key horror novels, stating that the book was "filled with dark, powerful images" and that Darker Than You Think "remains the definitive werewolf novel".

It was reprinted by UK-based Orion Books in 2003 as volume 38 of their Fantasy Masterworks series.

== Related ==
A sequel short story by Poul Anderson was published in a Williamson tribute anthology during the 1990s.

== Influences and admirers ==
The story was particularly influential on rocket scientist and occultist Jack Parsons. Williamson's "Crucible of Power" had influenced his ideas about the former but it was Darker Than You Think that paralleled his experiences with the latter:

Parsons had a particular interest in one of Williamson's stories that had recently appeared in the fantasy magazine Unknown.

...

The story's description of a scarlet-haired woman riding a great beast recalled Crowley's own personal mythology, and the tale of Will Barbee seems to have captured Parsons' imagination because it resonated with his own awakening fervor for the OTO.

Neil Gaiman has said he is a fan of the book.

== Sources ==
- Chalker, Jack L.; Mark Owings (1998). The Science-Fantasy Publishers: A Bibliographic History, 1923-1998. Westminster, MD and Baltimore: Mirage Press, Ltd. p. 236.
- Tuck, Donald H. (1978). The Encyclopedia of Science Fiction and Fantasy. Chicago: Advent. p. 462. ISBN 0-911682-22-8.
