= The Cosmic Geoids and One Other =

1949 short story collection by John Taine

- Dust-jacket from the first edition
- Author: John Taine
- Illustrator: Lou Goldstone
- Cover artist: Lou Goldstone
- Language: English
- Genre: Science fiction
- Publisher: Fantasy Publishing Company, Inc.
- Publication date: 1949
- Publication place: United States
- Media type: Print (hardback)
- Pages: 179 pp
- OCLC: 4609203

The Cosmic Geoids and One Other is a collection of two science fiction novellas by author John Taine (pseudonym of American writer Eric Temple Bell). It was first published in 1949 by Fantasy Publishing Company, Inc. in an edition of 1,200 copies. The title novella is a loose sequel to Taine's novel, The Time Stream, and was later serialized in the magazine Spaceway, in three parts beginning in December 1954. The other novella, "Black Goldfish", was first serialized in the magazine Fantasy Book, in two parts beginning in 1948.

== Contents ==
- "The Cosmic Geoids"
- "Black Goldfish"

== Reception ==
Reviewing the volume in Astounding, Forrest J Ackerman found the two stories wildly disparate: the title piece was "truly Stapledonian, but "Black Goldfish" was "the weakest thing Taine has ever done."

== Sources ==
- Chalker, Jack L.; Mark Owings (1998). The Science-Fantasy Publishers: A Bibliographic History, 1923-1998. Westminster, MD and Baltimore: Mirage Press, Ltd. p. 269.
- Tuck, Donald H. (1974). The Encyclopedia of Science Fiction and Fantasy. Chicago: Advent. p. 36. ISBN 0-911682-20-1.
