= G.O.G. 666 =

1954 novel by Eric Temple Bell

- Dust-jacket from the first edition
- Author: John Taine
- Cover artist: John T. Brooks
- Language: English
- Genre: Science fiction novel
- Publisher: Fantasy Press
- Publication date: 1954
- Publication place: United States
- Media type: Print (hardback)
- Pages: 256 pp
- OCLC: 1625086

G.O.G. 666 is a science fiction novel by author John Taine (pseudonym of Eric Temple Bell). It was first published in 1954 by Fantasy Press in an edition of 1,815 copies.

== Plot introduction ==
The novel concerns Russian genetics experiments resulting in a being that is half ape, half brain.

== Reception ==
Anthony Boucher received the novel unfavorably, describing it as "slow and muddled" and saying that "Neither story nor science can stand comparison with Taine's best work." P. Schuyler Miller reported that "it's not the best Taine." New Worlds reviewer Leslie Flood dismissed the novel as "science-fiction of the most boring and tasteless sort", saying "this literary lapse of a once-great fantasy author should have suffered the oblivion it deserved, had it not been for the overenthusiasm of a specialist science-fiction press".
