= Of Worlds Beyond =

Collection of essays on writing science fiction

- Dust-jacket from the first edition
- Editor: Lloyd Arthur Eshbach
- Cover artist: A. J. Donnell
- Language: English
- Subject: Essays
- Publisher: Fantasy Press
- Publication date: 1947
- Publication place: United States
- Media type: Print (Hardback)
- Pages: 96 pp
- OCLC: 573641

Of Worlds Beyond is a collection of essays about the techniques of writing science fiction, edited by Lloyd Arthur Eshbach. It was first published in 1947 by Fantasy Press in an edition of 1,262 copies. It has been reprinted by Advent in 1964 and by Dobson in 1965.

== Contents ==
- Introduction, by Lloyd Arthur Eshbach
- "On the Writing of Speculative Fiction", by Robert A. Heinlein
- "Writing a Science Novel", by Dr. Eric Temple Bell
- "The Logic of Fantasy", by Jack Williamson
- "Complication in the Science Fiction Story", by A. E. van Vogt
- "Humor in Science Fiction", by L. Sprague de Camp
- "The Epic of Space", by E. E. Smith, Ph.D.
- "The Science of Science Fiction Writing", by John W. Campbell, Jr.
