= Thomas McClary =

Thomas McClary may refer to:

- Thomas Calvert McClary (1909–1972), American writer of science fiction and westerns
- Thomas McClary (musician) (born 1949), American guitarist, singer, songwriter, and record producer, founder and lead guitarist of The Commodores
