= Zagat (name) =

Zagat is a surname. Notable people with the surname include:

- Arthur Leo Zagat (1896–1949), American lawyer and writer of pulp fiction and science fiction
- Tim and Nina Zagat (born 1940) American lawyers, co-founders and publishers of Zagat Restaurant Surveys
