= Beyond This Horizon =

1942 SF novel by Robert A. Heinlein

- First single volume edition – 1948
- Author: Robert A. Heinlein
- Cover artist: A. J. Donnell
- Language: English
- Genre: Science fiction
- Publisher: Astounding Science Fiction (original serial); Fantasy Press (single book)
- Publication date: 1942 (original serial); 1948 (single book)
- Publication place: United States
- Media type: Print (hardcover and paperback)

Beyond This Horizon is a science fiction novel by American writer Robert A. Heinlein. It was originally published as a two-part serial in Astounding Science Fiction (April, May 1942, under the pseudonym Anson MacDonald) and then as a single volume by Fantasy Press in 1948. It was awarded a Retro-Hugo award for best novel in 2018.

== Overview ==
The novel depicts a world in which genetic selection for increased health, longevity, and intelligence has become so widespread that the unmodified "control naturals" are a carefully managed and protected minority. Duels and the carrying of arms are socially accepted ways of maintaining civility in public. A brassard can be worn for immunity to duels, but this results in an inferior social status. The world has become an economic utopia; the "economic dividend" is so high that work has become optional. The chief economic problem uses up the economic surplus: many high-quality goods cost less than those of lower quality. The government invests heavily in scientific research, but it has the side effect of further increasing productivity a decade or more later, and so long-term projects with no expected economic return are favored above anything but medical research, on the theory that longer lifespans will consume more surplus.

Hamilton Felix (surname first), is the penultimate step in a "star line" designed to breed for the highest-quality human characteristics. However, he lacks eidetic memory, which disqualifies him for what he considers to be humanity's most important occupation: that of an "encyclopedic synthesist", who analyzes the sum total of human knowledge for untapped potential. As such, he finds his life and the society in which he lives to be enjoyable but meaningless. However, when the synthesists Mordan Claude seeks him out and inquires when he plans to continue his line, he finds himself drawn into an adventure that gives him purpose and also convinces him to continue his line.

Felix is the product of generations of genetic engineering. He is almost but not quite the perfect human. In the second half of the book, his genetically engineered son Theobald is born, the climax of generations of genetic engineering and selective breeding and a genetically perfect human. As Theobald grows, he begins to develop almost-superhuman mental abilities and is found to be a telepath.

As the novel draws to a close, Theobald suspects that his unborn sister is the reincarnation of Carvala, a government official who died shortly after meeting with Felix's wife and enquiring on when she would have a daughter. This is investigated, but is left vague by the end of the novel.

== Reception ==
Anthony Boucher and J. Francis McComas characterized Beyond This Horizon as among "the finest science fiction novels of the modern crop". P. Schuyler Miller reviewed the novel favorably, saying: "in true Heinlein manner the basic theme of the book smashes the screen of action only in the closing pages".

== In popular culture ==
In the Japanese visual novel Eden*, the term "Felix" is used in the setting to refer to genetically engineered humans with abilities similar to those described in the book, and the connection to Heinlein's work is referred to in dialogue.

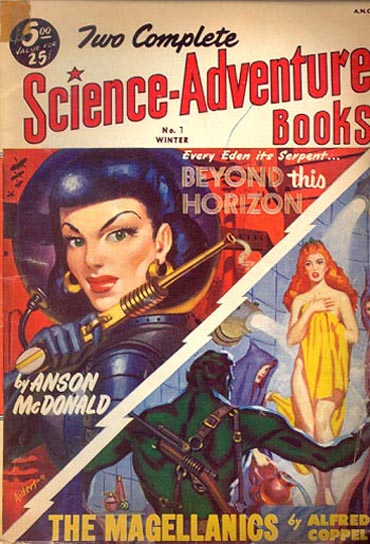
Beyond This Horizon was reprinted in Two Complete Science-Adventure Books in 1952, appearing under the "Anson McDonald" byline, even though the book edition had been published under Heinlein's own name four years earlier

Mordan Claude's quote "An armed society is a polite society" is often cited by pro-gun groups in justifying the proposal of universal carrying of arms. The context of the quote is usually omitted, though:

Well, in the first place an armed society is a polite society. Manners are good when one may have to back up his acts with his life. For me, politeness is a sine qua non of civilization. That’s a personal evaluation only. But gun-fighting has a strong biological use. We do not have enough things that kill off the weak and the stupid these days. But to stay alive as an armed citizen a man has to be either quick with his wits or with his hands, preferably both.

== See also ==
- For Us, The Living: A Comedy of Customs
