= The Forbidden Garden =

The Forbidden Garden may refer to:

- The Forbidden Garden (novel), a science fiction novel by John Taine
- Forbidden Corner, a garden in Yorkshire, England
- The imperial garden, the garden of the Forbidden City in Beijing
