= The Forbidden Garden (novel) =

1947 novel by Eric Temple Bell

- Dust-jacket from the first edition
- Author: John Taine
- Illustrator: A. J. Donnell
- Cover artist: A. J. Donnell
- Language: English
- Genre: Science fiction novel
- Publisher: Fantasy Press
- Publication date: 1947
- Publication place: United States
- Media type: Print (hardback)
- Pages: 278 pp
- OCLC: 1895266

The Forbidden Garden is a science fiction novel by author John Taine (pseudonym of Eric Temple Bell). It was first published in 1947 by Fantasy Press in an edition of 3,029 copies.

== Plot introduction ==
The novel concerns the search for soil from a remote part of Asia for the cultivation of weird flowers that can destroy humanity.

== Reception ==
P. Schuyler Miller reviewed the novel favorably, writing "[Taine] is standing at your elbow, nudging you with evident relish when you come to passages that were fun to write." Thrilling Wonder Stories also received the novel favorably, declaring that the author "proves his right to the semi-legendary eminence he holds for followers of the fantastic presented via plausible pseudo-science", but faulted Taine for weak characterization, saying "His cast of players comprise a collection of stock dramatic types and no more".
