= Bell series =

In mathematics, the Bell series is a formal power series used to study properties of arithmetical functions. Bell series were introduced and developed by Eric Temple Bell.

Given an arithmetic function $f$ and a prime $p$, define the formal power series $f_p(x)$, called the Bell series of $f$ modulo $p$ as:

$$f_p(x)=\sum_{n=0}^\infty f(p^n)x^n.$$

Two multiplicative functions can be shown to be identical if all of their Bell series are equal; this is sometimes called the uniqueness theorem: given multiplicative functions $f$ and $g$, one has $f=g$ if and only if:

$f_p(x)=g_p(x)$ for all primes $p$.

Two series may be multiplied (sometimes called the multiplication theorem): For any two arithmetic functions $f$ and $g$, let $h=f*g$ be their Dirichlet convolution. Then for every prime $p$, one has:

$$h_p(x)=f_p(x) g_p(x).\,$$

In particular, this makes it trivial to find the Bell series of a Dirichlet inverse.

If $f$ is completely multiplicative, then formally:

$$f_p(x)=\frac{1}{1-f(p)x}.$$

== Examples ==
The following is a table of the Bell series of well-known arithmetic functions.

- The Möbius function $\mu$ has $\mu_p(x)=1-x.$
- The Mobius function squared has $\mu_p^2(x) = 1+x.$
- Euler's totient $\varphi$ has $\varphi_p(x)=\frac{1-x}{1-px}.$
- The multiplicative identity of the Dirichlet convolution $\delta$ has $\delta_p(x)=1.$
- The Liouville function $\lambda$ has $\lambda_p(x)=\frac{1}{1+x}.$
- The power function Id_{k} has $(\textrm{Id}_k)_p(x)=\frac{1}{1-p^kx}.$ Here, Id_{k} is the completely multiplicative function $\operatorname{Id}_k(n)=n^k$.
- The divisor function $\sigma_k$ has $(\sigma_k)_p(x)=\frac{1}{(1-p^kx)(1-x)}.$
- The constant function, with value 1, satisfies $1_p(x) = (1-x)^{-1}$, i.e., is the geometric series.
- If $f(n) = 2^{\omega(n)} = \sum_{d|n} \mu^2(d)$ is the power of the prime omega function, then $f_p(x) = \frac{1+x}{1-x}.$
- Suppose that f is multiplicative and g is any arithmetic function satisfying $f(p^{n+1}) = f(p) f(p^n) - g(p) f(p^{n-1})$ for all primes p and $n \geq 1$. Then $f_p(x) = \left(1-f(p)x + g(p)x^2\right)^{-1}.$
- If $\mu_k(n) = \sum_{d^k|n} \mu_{k-1}\left(\frac{n}{d^k}\right) \mu_{k-1}\left(\frac{n}{d}\right)$ denotes the Möbius function of order k, then $(\mu_k)_p(x) = \frac{1-2x^k+x^{k+1}}{1-x}.$

== See also ==
- Bell numbers
