= The Encyclopedia of Science Fiction and Fantasy =

The Encyclopedia of Science Fiction and Fantasy (sometimes named The Encyclopedia of Science Fiction and Fantasy through 1968) is a three volume reference work on science fiction and fantasy, edited by Donald H. Tuck and published by Advent.

Volume 1 (Who's Who, A-L) was published in 1974. Volume 2 (Who's Who, M-Z) was published in 1978. Volume 3 (Miscellaneous) was published in 1982.

The first two volumes contain about 2500 articles. The work mostly covers the period 1945–1968.

Volume 3 won a Hugo Award in the Nonfiction category.
