= Arthur Leo Zagat =

American author and lawyer (1896–1949)

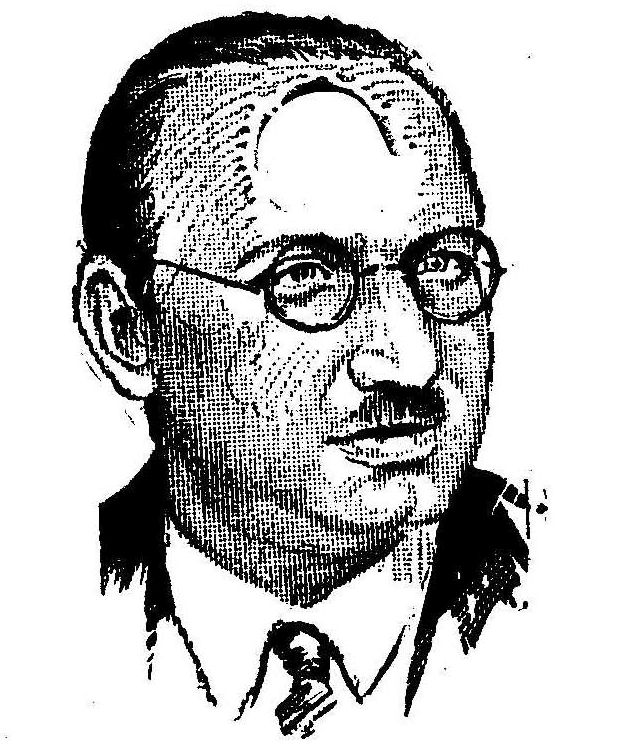
- Arthur Leo Zagat c. 1930
- Born: February 15, 1896; New York City, US
- Died: April 3, 1949 (aged 53); New York City, US
- Occupations: Lawyer; short story writer; novelist
- Spouse: Ruth Zagat
- Children: Hermine Zagat
- Writing career
- Genres: Pulp fiction, Science fiction

Arthur Leo Zagat (1896–1949) was an American lawyer and writer of pulp fiction and science fiction. Trained in the law, he gave it up to write professionally. Zagat is noted for his collaborations with fellow lawyer Nat Schachner. During the last two decades of his life, Zagat wrote short stories prolifically. About 500 pieces appeared in a variety of pulp magazines, including Thrilling Wonder Stories, Argosy, Dime Mystery Magazine, Horror Stories, Operator No. 5 and Astounding. Zagat also wrote the "Doc Turner" stories that regularly appeared in The Spider pulp magazine throughout the 1930s and the "Red Finger" series that ran in Operator #5, and wrote for Spicy Mystery Stories as "Morgan LaFay". A novel, Seven Out of Time, was published by Fantasy Press in 1949, the year he died. His most well-known series is probably the Tomorrow series of six novelettes from Argosy (1939 thru 1941), collected into two volumes by Altus Press in 2014.

Zagat was a graduate of City College who served in the US military in Europe during World War I. After the war, he studied at Bordeaux University, then graduated from Fordham Law School. He taught writing at New York University. In 1941, he was elected to the first national executive committee for the Authors League pulp writers' section. During World War II, he held an executive position in the Office of War Information. After that war, Zagat was active in organizing writers' workshops and other assistance for hospitalized veterans.

Zagat was married to Ruth Zagat; the couple had one daughter, Hermine. He died of a heart attack on April 3, 1949, at his home in the Bronx.

== Bibliography ==
- The Complete Saga of Tomorrow, Steeger Books (2021) [from Argosy]
- Drink We Deep, Steeger Books (2017) [from Argosy]
- The Complete Cases of Anne Marsh, Steeger Books (2019) [from Dime Detective]
- The Hand of Red Finger, Altus Press (2010)
- Summer Camp for Corpses and Other Stories: The Weird Tales of Arthur Leo Zagat v1, Ramble House
- The Corpse Factory and Other Stories: The Weird Tales of Arthur Leo Zagat Volume 2, Ramble House
- They Dine in Darkness and Other Stories: The Weird Tales of Arthur Leo Zagat Volume 3, Ramble House
- The Man From Hell, Black Dog Books (2010) [spicy pulp stories written as by Morgan LeFay]
- Graveyard Honeymoon and Two Other Stories from Spicy Mystery, Black Dog Books (2006)
- Exiles of the Moon, Armchair Fiction [written with Nat Schachner]
- Seven Out of Time, Wildside Press
