= E. Everett Evans =

American novelist

- Born: Edward Everett Evans; November 30, 1893; Coldwater, Michigan, US
- Died: December 2, 1958 (aged 65)
- Writing career
- Genre: Science fiction

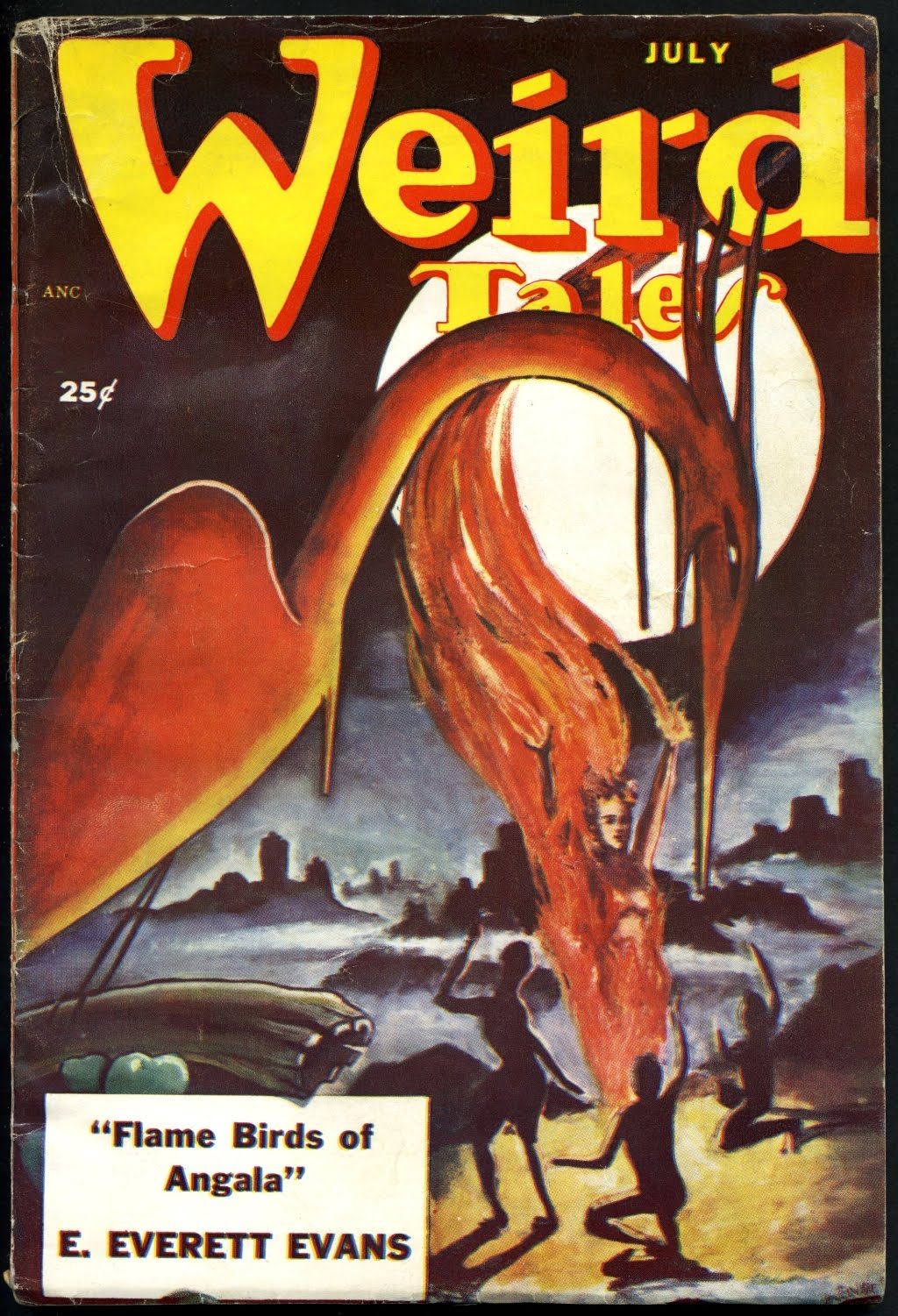
Evans's "Flame Birds of Angala" was the cover story in the July 1951 Weird Tales

Edward Everett Evans (November 30, 1893 – December 2, 1958) was an American science fiction writer and fan. He married science-fiction author Thelma D. Hamm in 1953.

His works include the novels Man of Many Minds (1953), The Planet Mappers (1955), and Alien Minds (1955). Additionally, a collaboration with E. E. "Doc" Smith (Masters of Space, 1976) and a collection (Food For Demons, 1971) were published posthumously. All of the novels have become public domain.

== Big Heart Award ==
In 1959 the E. Everett Evans "Big Heart" Award was started in honor of Evans. The award was administered by Forrest J Ackerman until 2000 when David Kyle took over. The award was renamed in 2006 to the Forrest J Ackerman Big Heart Award, and then renamed again in 2018 to the David A. Kyle Big Heart Award.

In 1999 it was awarded to both Peter Hassall and Chris Collier, in 2000 it was awarded to both Robert Silverberg and Jack Williamson, and in 2004 the award was won by Erwin S. "Filthy Pierre" Strauss. In 2024 the award was presented at the 82nd World Science Fiction Convention to Michelle Drayton-Harold, for going "above and beyond in welcoming new people to fandom, and supporting the ideals of fandom".

== Bibliography ==
- E. Everett Evans (1953). Man of Many Minds. Fantasy Press. p. 222. ISBN 9781421835181.
- E. Everett Evans (1955). The Planet Mappers. New York: Dodd, Mead & Co. p. 243. ISBN 9781537817965.
- E. Everett Evans (1955). Alien Minds. Fantasy Press. p. 223. ISBN 9781329903722.
