= Lloyd Arthur Eshbach =

American novelist (1910–2003)

Lloyd Arthur Eshbach c. 1949

Weird Tales (October 1936, volume 28, number 3), featuring Isle of the Undead by Lloyd Arthur Eshbach

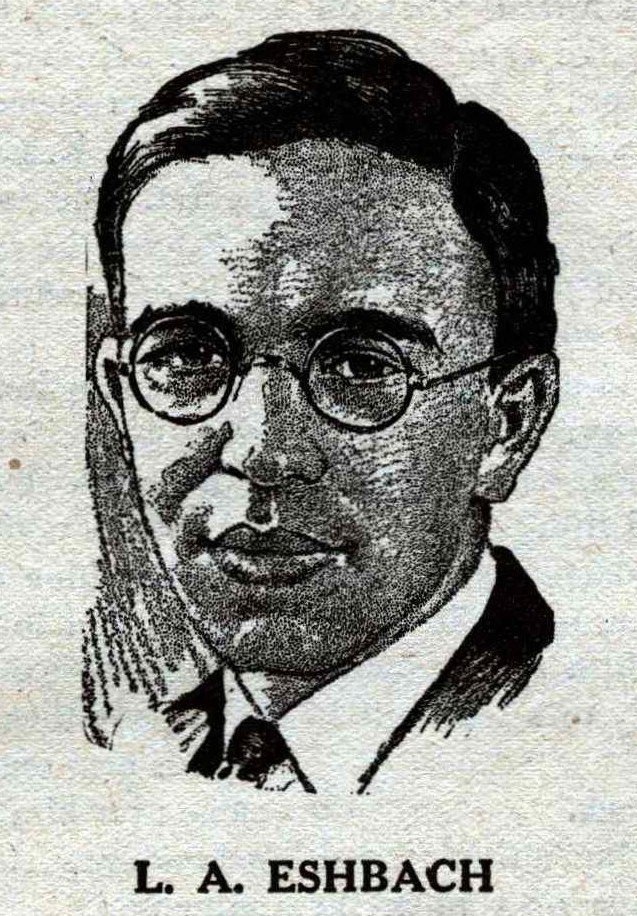
Eshbach as pictured in Wonder Stories in 1932

Lloyd Arthur Eshbach (June 20, 1910 – October 29, 2003) was an American science fiction fan, publisher and writer, secular and religious publisher, and minister.

== Biography ==
Born in Palm, Pennsylvania, Eshbach grew up in Reading in the same state. He discovered science fiction at age 15 and began writing letters to the professional magazines, then started to write his own stories. The third story he wrote sold to Science Wonder Stories in 1929. In the early 1930s, while still writing his own stories and articles, he published a fanzine,The Galleon, and helped William Crawford launch his semiprofessional magazines Marvel Tales and Unusual Stories. He initiated Fantasy Press, a small press which published the work of authors such as E. E. Smith, Jack Williamson, Robert A. Heinlein and John W. Campbell, Jr. Fantasy Press published a total of 46 titles in its lifetime, with two additional fantasy titles published under the subsidiary imprint, Polaris Press. Fantasy Press books were produced in limited print runs averaging 3,750 copies each, with between 250 and 500 copies of each title bearing a limited plate inserted after the title page that was numbered and autographed by the book's author. These constituted the first hardcover editions of many of these works, previously available only in used copies of magazines.

Eshbach was a church publisher from 1958 to 1962, then he was a salesman for the Moody Bible Institute until retirement in 1975. Upon his retirement, he became a pastor in the Evangelical Congregational Church and served churches of that denomination in Pennsylvania in Lancaster County, Reading, and Womelsdorf.

Eshbach was a lifelong science fiction fan, and besides creating Fantasy Press he was instrumental in assisting others in the creation and operation of their own fan or specialty presses, including William Crawford of Fantasy Publishing and later F.P.C.I. (Eshbach bought Crawford his first set of type for his press) and Thomas Hadley, of first The Buffalo Book Company and later Hadley Publishing Company (both of Providence, RI), whom Eshbach instructed and assisted with marketing and sales of his books and organization of his mailing list (which list eventually became the basis for the formation of a sales base for his own Fantasy Press).

His memoirs, Over My Shoulder: Reflections on a Science Fiction Era, were published in 1983; and his last novel, The Scroll of Lucifer, in 1990. Other books included The Armlet of the Gods, The Land Beyond the Gate, The Sorceress of Scath and The Tyrant of Time. He also edited Of Worlds Beyond: The Science of Science Fiction Writing (Reading, PA: Fantasy, 1947), the first book-length work on science fiction writing from a professional point of view.

An active member of science fiction's First Fandom, he was Guest of Honor at the 1949 World Science Fiction Convention and the 1995 World Fantasy Convention. He died in 2003

== Hubbard quotation ==
In his 1982 memoirs, Over My Shoulder: Reflections on a Science Fiction Era, Eshbach quotes L. Ron Hubbard as telling him in 1949, "I'd like to start a religion. That's where the money is."

== Sources ==
- Ashley, Mike (2000). The Time Machines: The Story of the Science-Fiction Pulp Magazines from the beginning to 1950. Liverpool: Liverpool University Press. ISBN 0-85323-865-0.
