= The Black Flame (novel) =

1948 post-apocalyptic science fiction novel

- First edition
- Author: Stanley G. Weinbaum
- Illustrator: A.J. Donnell
- Language: English
- Genre: Science fiction
- Publisher: Fantasy Press
- Publication date: 1948
- Publication place: United States
- Pages: 240

The Black Flame is a post-apocalyptic science fiction novel by American writer Stanley G. Weinbaum, originally published in hardcover by Fantasy Press in 1948.

After his death, Weinbaum became "science fiction's first cult author"; "Dawn of Flame" appeared as the title piece of a 1936 memorial story collection, while "The Black Flame" was the lead feature in the January 1939 debut issue of Startling Stories. The book is a fix-up, based on two previously unpublished stories—"Dawn of Flame" and "The Black Flame"—which Weinbaum marketed, but was unable to sell, before his death.

It was reissued in paperback by Harlequin Books in 1953, followed by an Avon Books edition in 1970. French translations were published in 1956 and 1972. In 1995, Tachyon Publications issued a substantially longer "restored edition" from carbons of Weinbaum's original manuscript, found in a trunk of Weinbaum's papers held by his grandson.

== Plot ==
The novel starts several hundred years after most of mankind is wiped out by a plague and tells the story of a family of immortals who seek to conquer the world with advanced science. Its story concerns a brother and sister who have become immortal. In "Dawn of the Flame" the sister, Margaret of Urbs, known as "Black Margot", is a Joan-of-Arc-type, leading the battle against the mutated of mankind. By the time of "The Black Flame", she is jaded and finds that being an immortal can be boring.

== Publication history of original edition ==
Weinbaum was a popular member of the Milwaukee Fictioneers, a loose-knit group of authors from that city. The writers decided to issue a memorial volume of Weinbaum's best work. The collection, Dawn of Flame, was edited by Ray Palmer and printed by Conrad Ruppert. Originally, the book was to have an introduction by Palmer, but Weinberg's widow deemed that writing "too personal" and another introduction, by Lawrence Keating, was substituted. Only five copies of Dawn of Flame with the Palmer introduction were bound, all of those going to those closest to Weinbaum and the publishing project. The rest of the edition, approximately 250 copies, were offered for sale at $2.50 each. The book was extremely attractive, being bound in full leather and stamped in gold; featuring fine paper; and over 300 pages long (Ruppert had the binding done by a Bible bindery and the book resembled a black leather Bible). Unfortunately, the $2.50 price tag was too much for most fans and the book sold poorly. Dawn of Flame is extremely rare and stands as one of the cornerstones of any Specialty Press collection.

== Reception ==
Sam Moskowitz praised the Fantasy Press edition, noting that "the Weinbaum method of story delineation is as effective as ever." Thrilling Wonder Stories also reviewed the volume favorably, saying that "Weinbaum wrote easily and vividly and his characterization is such that the reader never fails to feel the pressing and urgent reality of what is actually arrant make-believe." Frederik Pohl, noting accurately that Weinbaum had "use[d] the basic plot and conception" of the unsold "Dawn of Flame" to construct "The Black Flame", still concluded that "each, read independently, is a first-rate science fiction novel."

Samuel R. Delany compared Black Margot to Joanna Russ's Jael and William Gibson's Molly, declaring Weinbaum "a man particularly concerned with the construction of his female characters."

== Sources ==
- Chalker, Jack L.; Mark Owings (1998). The Science-Fantasy Publishers: A Bibliographic History, 1923-1998. Westminster, MD and Baltimore: Mirage Press, Ltd. p. 235.
