= James Morgan Walsh =

Australian writer (1897–1952)

- Born: 23 February 1897; Geelong, Victoria
- Died: 29 August 1952 (aged 55); Weston-Super-Mare, England
- Occupation: novelist
- Writing career
- Language: English
- Years active: 1913–1952
- Notable work: The Lost Valley

James Morgan Walsh (J. M. Walsh) was an Australian novelist who was born in Geelong, Victoria in 1897 and educated at Xavier College.

He published his first novel in 1921, and encouraged by its success, became a full-time writer in 1923.

He married Louisa Mary Murphy on 1 January 1925, and later that year the couple settled in the United Kingdom. Walsh was to remain there until his death in 1952 in Western-Super-Mare, Somerset, England.

Walsh was a very prolific writer, producing around 94 novels, across a range of genres (mystery, crime, war, thriller, adventure and science fiction) under a number of pseudonyms.

In addition to his novels Walsh also wrote a number of short stories, and books for children.

From 1938 Walsh lived at Weston-super-Mare, Somerset, where he died on 29 August 1952.

== Bibliography ==
=== Novels ===
- Tap Tap Island, (1921)
- The Lost Valley (1921)
- Back o' Beyond (1922)
- Turmoil (1924)
- The Solitary Way (1925)
- Once in a Blue Moon (1925)
- Overdue : A Romance of Unknown New Guinea (1925)
- The White Mask (1925)
- The Hairpin Mystery (1926)
- The Company of Shadows (1926)
- The Mystery of the Crystal Skull (1926) as by George M. White
- The Hand of Doom (1926)
- Anne of Flying Gap (1926) as by H. Haverstock Hill
- The Brethren of the Compass (1926)
- The League of Missing Men (1927)
- The Man Behind the Curtain (1927)
- A Girl of the Island (1927)
- The Silver Greyhound (1927)
- The Crimes of Cleopatra's Needle (1927)
- The Images of Han (1927)
- Spoil of the Desert (1927) as by H. Haverstock Hill
- The Purple Stain (1928)
- The Black Cross (1928)
- The Golden Isle (1928) as by H. Haverstock Hill
- The Black Ghost (1929)
- The Tempania Mystery (1929)
- The Mystery Man (1929)
- Golden Harvest (1929) as by H. Haverstock Hill
- The Week-End Crime Book : Be Your Own Detective (1929) with Audrey Baldwin
- The Mystery of the Green Caterpillars (1930)
- Exit Simeon Hex (1930)
- The Secret of the Crater (1930) as by H. Haverstock Hill
- Vandals of the Void (1931)
- The Whisperer (1931)
- Mystery House (1931)
- Lady Incognito (1932)
- Spies are Abroad (1933)
- The Secret Service Girl (1933)
- The Bandits of the Night (1933)
- A Woman of Destiny (1933) as by Stephen Maddock
- King's Messenger (1933)
- Spies in Pursuit (1934)
- Danger after Dark (1934) as by Stephen Maddock
- Gentlemen of the Night (1934) as by Stephen Maddock
- The White Siren (1934) as by Stephen Maddock
- The Man from Whitehall (1934)
- Terror Out of Space (1934) as by H. Haverstock Hill
- Tiger of the Night (1935)
- The Eye at the Keyhole (1935) as by Stephen Maddock
- Conspirators in Capri (1935) as by Stephen Maddock
- Spies Never Return (1935)
- Spies' Vendetta (1936)
- Conspirators Three (1936 as by Stephen Maddock
- Forbidden Frontiers (1936) as by Stephen Maddock
- The Silent Man (1936)
- The Half Ace (1936)
- Spies in Spain (1937)
- Conspirators at Large (1937) as by Stephen Maddock
- Island of Spies (1937)
- Chalk-Face (1937)
- Doorway to Danger (1938) as by Stephen Maddock
- Lamp-Post 592 (1938) as by Stephen Maddock
- Dial 999 (1938)
- Black Dragon (1938)
- Spies Along the Severn (1939) as by Stephen Maddock
- Bullets for Breakfast (1939)
- King's Enemies (1939)
- Secret Weapons (1940)
- Spades at Midnight (1940) as by Stephen Maddock
- Death at His Elbow (1941)
- Face Value (1941)
- Date With a Spy (1941) as by Stephen Maddock
- Spies From the Skies (1941)
- Step Aside to Death (1941) as by Stephen Maddock
- Danger Zone (1942)
- Island Alert (1943)
- Drums Beat at Dusk (1943) as by Stephen Maddock
- Something on the Stairs (1944) as by Stephen Maddock
- I'll Never Like Friday Again (1945) as by Stephen Maddock
- Whispers in the Dark (1945)
- Express Delivery (1946)
- Overture to Trouble (1946) as by Stephen Maddock
- Once in Tiger Bay (1947)
- Exit Only (1947) as by Stephen Maddock
- East of Picadilly (1948) as by Stephen Maddock
- Walking Shadow (1948)
- Time to Kill (1949)
- Keep Your Fingers Crossed (1949) as by Stephen Maddock
- Private Line (1950) as by Stephen Maddock
- Return to Tiger Bay (1950)
- Public Mischief (1951) as by Stephen Maddock
- Next, Please (1951)
- Close Shave (1952) as by Stephen Maddock
- King of Tiger Bay (1952)
- Vanguard to Neptune (1952)

=== Fiction for children ===
- The Secret of the Stargazers' Club (1926) as by Jack Carew
- The Leather Glove (1927) as by Jack Carew
- The Silver Idol (1931) as by Jack Carew

=== Short story collection ===
- Mutton Dressed as Lamb and Live Bait (1944)
