= Genus Homo (novel) =

1941 novel by L. Sprague de Camp and P. Schuyler Miller

- Dust-jacket of the first edition.
- Authors: L. Sprague de Camp; P. Schuyler Miller
- Cover artist: Edd Cartier
- Language: English
- Genre: Science fiction
- Publisher: Fantasy Press
- Publication date: 1950
- Publication place: United States
- Media type: Print (hardback)
- Pages: ix, 225

Genus Homo is a science fiction novel by American writers L. Sprague de Camp and P. Schuyler Miller. It was first published in the science fiction magazine Super Science Stories for March, 1941, and subsequently published in book form in hardcover by Fantasy Press in 1950 and in paperback by Berkley Books in 1961. An E-book edition was published by Gollancz's SF Gateway imprint on September 29, 2011 as part of a general release of de Camp's works in electronic form. It has also been translated into French, Italian and German.

The book has the distinction of being one of de Camp's first science fiction novels and Miller's only novel. It is perhaps the earliest novel dealing with the afterwards popular theme of humanity being replaced by intelligent apes in the future, later epitomized by Pierre Boulle's Planet of the Apes.

1961 edition by Berkley Books.

== Premise ==
A bus is trapped in the cave-in of a tunnel and its passengers are preserved for millennia in a state of suspended animation. When their vehicle is ultimately uncovered they awaken to a future in which humankind has vanished from the face of the earth, and gorillas have evolved to intelligence and become a dominant species. The preserved humans must now adjust to a world in which they have become obsolete.

== Reception ==
Groff Conklin noted that although the execution of the novel was flawed, it remained "a story with real merit." Astounding's reviewer declared it to be "a delightful volume", citing its "humor, sound science, and certain sly digs at the history and events of our own time."

== Relation to other works ==
The plot feature of other primates taking the place of an extinct humanity in the far future is also explored in de Camp's short story "Living Fossil" (1939).

== Sources ==
- Laughlin, Charlotte; Daniel J. H. Levack (1983). De Camp: An L. Sprague de Camp Bibliography. San Francisco: Underwood/Miller. pp. 56–57.
