= Thomas Calvert McClary =

American novelist

- Born: February 13, 1909
- Died: 1972 (aged 62–63)
- Occupations: Author, scriptwriter
- Writing career
- Period: Twentieth century
- Genre: Science fiction
- Notable work: Rebirth: When Everyone Forgot!

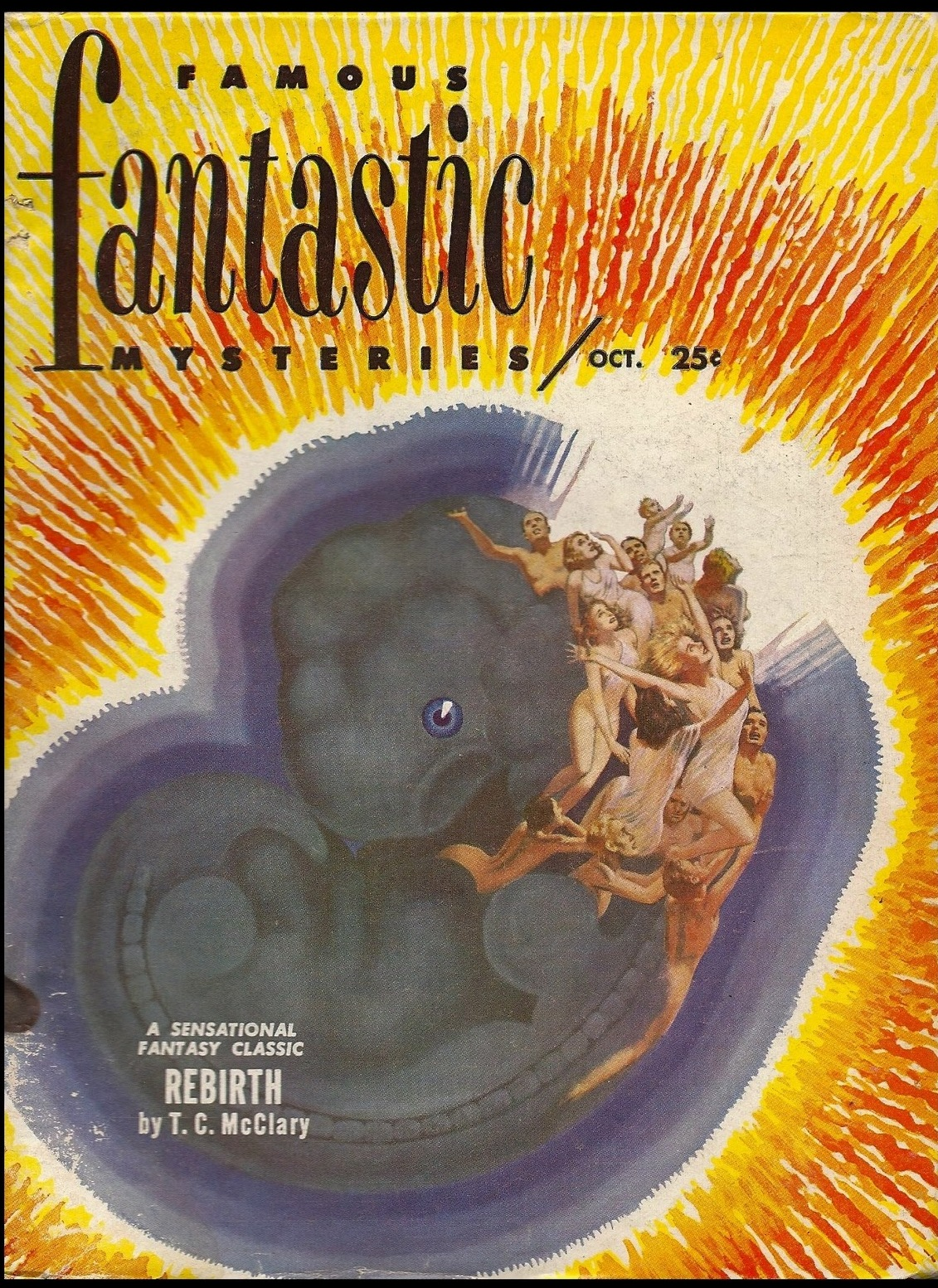
McClary's novel Rebirth, originally serialized in Astounding Stories in 1934, was reprinted in the October 1951 issue of Famous Fantastic Mysteries

Thomas Calvert McClary (February 13, 1909 – 1972) was an American writer of science fiction and westerns. He wrote under the pseudonyms T.C. McClary, Thomas Calvert, and Calvin Peregoy. His books include:

- Rebirth: When Everyone Forgot! (1944) (originally serialized in 1934 in Astounding Science Fiction)
- Three Thousand Years (1938 ASF; 1954)
- The Tommyknocker (1940 In Unknown magazine)
