= Eric Temple Bell =

Scottish-born mathematician and science fiction writer

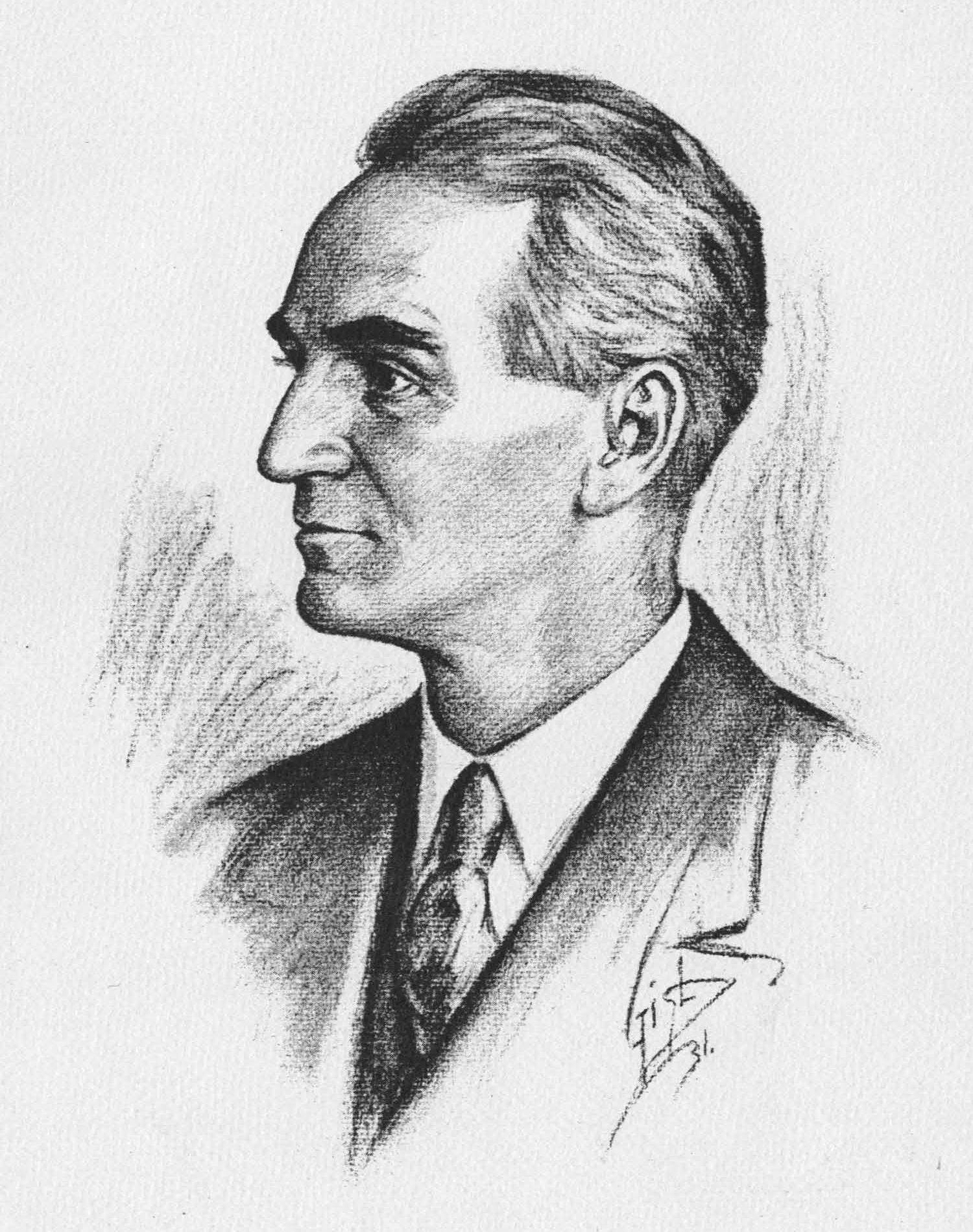
- 1931 drawing of Eric Temple Bell
- Born: 7 February 1883; Peterhead, Scotland
- Died: 21 December 1960 (aged 77); Watsonville, California, U.S.
- Education: Stanford University; University of Washington; Columbia University (Ph.D.)
- Known for: Number theory Bell series Bell polynomials Bell numbers Bell triangle Ordered Bell numbers Men of Mathematics
- Awards: Bôcher Memorial Prize (1924)
- Scientific career
- Fields: Mathematics
- Workplaces: University of Washington; California Institute of Technology
- Doctoral advisor: Frank Nelson Cole; Cassius Keyser
- Doctoral students: Morgan Ward; Zhou Peiyuan

Eric Temple Bell (7 February 1883 – 21 December 1960) was a mathematician, educator and science fiction writer who lived in the United States for most of his life. He published non-fiction using his given name and fiction as John Taine.

== Early life and education ==
Eric Temple Bell was born in Peterhead, Aberdeen, Scotland as third of three children to Helen Jane Lyall and James Bell Jr. His father, a factor, relocated to San Jose, California, in 1884, when Eric was fifteen months old. After his father died on 4 January 1896, the family returned to Bedford, England.

Bell was educated at Bedford Modern School, where his teacher Edward Mann Langley inspired him to continue the study of mathematics. Bell returned to the United States, by way of Montreal, in 1902. He received degrees in mathematics from Stanford University (1904), the University of Washington (1908), and Columbia University (1912) (where he was a student of Cassius Jackson Keyser).

== Career ==
Bell was part of the faculty first at the University of Washington and later at the California Institute of Technology. While at the University of Washington, he taught Howard P. Robertson and encouraged him to enroll at Caltech for his doctoral studies.

Bell researched number theory; see in particular Bell series. He attempted—not altogether successfully—to make the traditional umbral calculus (understood at that time to be the same thing as the "symbolic method" of Blissard) logically rigorous. He also did much work using generating functions, treated as formal power series, without concern for convergence. He is the eponym of the Bell polynomials and the Bell numbers of combinatorics.

In 1924 Bell was awarded the Bôcher Memorial Prize for his work in mathematical analysis. In 1927, he was elected to the National Academy of Sciences. He was elected to the American Philosophical Society in 1937. He died in 1960 in Watsonville, California.

== Work ==
=== Fiction and poetry ===
During the early 1920s, Bell wrote several long poems. He also wrote several science fiction novels by the pseudonym John Taine, which independently invented some of the earliest devices and ideas of science fiction. His novels later also serialised in magazines. Basil Davenport, writing in The New York Times, described Taine as "one of the first real scientists to write science-fiction [who] did much to bring it out of the interplanetary cops-and-robbers stage". But he concluded that "[Taine] is sadly lacking as a novelist, in style and especially in characterization". In contrast, Taine was highly praised as a writer in science fiction journals. P. Schuyler Miller, for example, praised his work - "... in every one of his books he is standing at your elbow, nudging you with evident relish ..."

=== Writing about mathematics ===
Bell wrote a book of biographical essays titled Men of Mathematics (one chapter of which was the first popular account of the 19th century mathematician Sofya Kovalevskaya), which is still in print. He originally wrote it under the title The Lives of Mathematicians, but the publishers, Simon and Schuster, cut about a third of it (125,000 words), and, in order to tie in with their book Men of Art (by Thomas Craven), gave it the title Men of Mathematics which he did not like. The book inspired notable mathematicians including Julia Robinson, John Forbes Nash, Jr., and Andrew Wiles to begin careers in mathematics. However, historians of mathematics have disputed the accuracy of much of Bell's history. In fact, Bell does not distinguish carefully between anecdote and history. He has been much criticized for romanticizing Évariste Galois. For example: "[E. T.] Bell's account [of Galois's life], by far the most famous, is also the most fictitious". His treatment of Georg Cantor, which reduced Cantor's relationships with his father and with Leopold Kronecker to stereotypes, has been criticized even more severely.

While this book was under printing, he also wrote and had published another book, The Handmaiden of the Sciences. Bell's later book Development of Mathematics has been less famous, but his biographer Constance Reid finds it has fewer weaknesses. His book on Fermat's Last Theorem, The Last Problem, was published the year after his death and is a hybrid of social history and the history of mathematics. It inspired mathematician Andrew Wiles to solve the problem.

In his book about Paul Erdős, titled The Man Who Loved Only Numbers, Paul Hoffman wrote:

Bell... had a rare gift for words as well as numbers. Those who have witnessed the deep truths of mathematics, Bell wrote, "have experienced something no jellyfish has ever felt." He had a knack for pithily summing up a man's character: Pythagoras, Bell said, whose mysticism had hobbled his mathematics, was "one-tenth genius, nine-tenths sheer fudge." And if Bell's prose was at times flowery, The Last Problem and his better-known 1937 work, Men of Mathematics, sowed the seeds of mathematical interest in three generations of readers.

=== Non-fiction books ===
- An Arithmetical Theory of Certain Numerical Functions, Seattle Washington, The university, 1915, 50p. PDF/DjVu copy from Internet Archive.
- The Cyclotomic Quinary Quintic, Lancaster, Pennsylvania, The New Era Printing Company, 1912, 97p.
- Algebraic Arithmetic, New York, American Mathematical Society, 1927, 180p.
- Debunking Science, Seattle, University of Washington book store, 1930, 40p.
- The Queen of the Sciences, Stechert, 1931, 138p.
- Numerology, Baltimore: The Williams & Wilkins Co., 1933, 187p. LCCN 33-6808
  - Reprint: Westport, CT: Hyperion Press, 1979, ISBN 0-88355-774-6, 187p. – "Reprint of the ed. published by Century Co., New York" LCCN 78-13855
- The Search for Truth, Baltimore, Reynal and Hitchcock, 1934, 279p.
  - Reprint: Williams and Wilkins Co, 1935
- The Handmaiden of the Sciences, Williams & Wilkins, 1937, 216p.
- Man and His Lifebelts, New York, Reynal & Hitchcock, 1938, 340p.
  - Reprint: George Allen & Unwin Ltd., 1935, 2nd printing 1946
  - Reprint: Kessinger Publishing, 2005
- Men of Mathematics, New York, Simon & Schuster, 1937, 592p.
  - Reprint: Touchstone (Simon & Schuster paperback), 1986. ISBN 0671628186 LCCN 86-10229
- The Development of Mathematics, New York, McGraw–Hill, 1940, 637p.
  - Second Edition: New York, McGraw–Hill, 1945, 637p.
  - Reprint: Dover Publications, 1992
- The Magic of Numbers, Whittlesey House, 1946, 418p.
  - Reprint: New York, Dover Publications, 1991, ISBN 0-486-26788-1, 418p.
  - Reprint: Sacred Science Institute, 2006
- Mathematics: Queen and Servant of Science, McGraw-Hill, 1951, 437p.
- The Last Problem, New York, Simon & Schuster, 1961, 308p.
  - Reprint: Mathematical Association of America, 1990, ISBN 0-88385-451-1, 326p.

=== Scholarly papers ===
- "Arithmetical paraphrases". In: Transactions of the American Mathematical Society 22, 1921, pp. 1–30 and 198–219
- "Arithmetical equivalents for a remarkable identity between theta functions". In: Mathematische Zeitschrift 13, 1922, pp. 146–152
- "Existence theorems on the numbers of representations of odd integers as sums of 4t + 2 squares". In: Crelles Journal 163, 1930, pp. 65–70
- "Exponential numbers". In: The American Mathematical Monthly 41, 1934, pp. 411–419

=== Novels ===
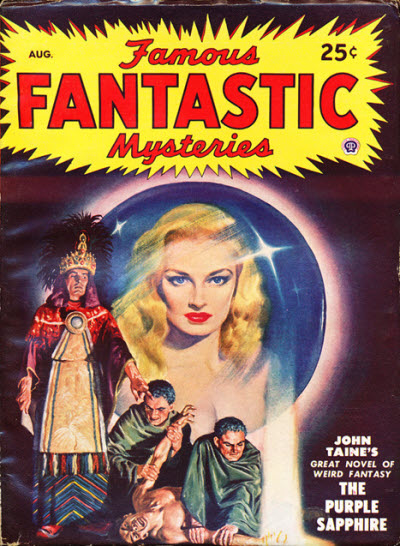
The Purple Sapphire was reprinted in the August 1948 issue of Famous Fantastic Mysteries.

- The Purple Sapphire (1924)
- The Gold Tooth (1927)
- Quayle's Invention (1927)
- Green Fire (1928)
- The Greatest Adventure (1929)
- The Iron Star (1930)
- The White Lily (1930)
- The Time Stream (1931)
- Seeds of Life (1931)
- Before the Dawn (1934)
- Tomorrow (1939)
- The Forbidden Garden (1947)
- The Cosmic Geoids and One Other (1949)
- The Crystal Horde (1952)
- G.O.G. 666 (1954)

=== Poetry ===
- The Singer (1916)

== Sources ==
- Reid, Constance (1993). The Search for E. T. Bell, Also Known as John Taine. Washington, DC: Mathematical Association of America. x + 372 pp. ISBN 0-88385-508-9. OCLC 29190602.
- Rothman, T. (1982). "Genius and biographers: the fictionalization of Evariste Galois". American Mathematics Monthly 89, no. 2, 84–106.
