= J. Francis McComas =

American science fiction editor (1911–1978)

- J. Francis McComas circa 1954
- Born: Jesse Francis McComas; June 9, 1911; Kansas City, Missouri, U.S.
- Died: April 19, 1978 (aged 66); Fremont, California, U.S.
- Occupations: Writer, editor
- Writing career
- Pen name: Webb Marlowe

Jesse Francis McComas (June 9, 1911 – April 19, 1978) was an American science fiction editor. McComas wrote several stories on his own in the 1950s using both his own name and the pseudonym Webb Marlowe.

He entered publishing in 1941 as a salesman and editorial representative, spending two years in New York with Random House. He returned to California in 1944, working as the Pacific Coast editorial representative for Henry Holt and Company. For Simon & Schuster he became their Northern California sales manager and general editorial representative.

McComas and Raymond J. Healy co-edited Adventures in Time and Space (1946), one of the first major science fiction anthologies of previously published works re-printed in hardcover by a major publisher. Within a few years, he and Anthony Boucher were the founding co-editor of the influential The Magazine of Fantasy & Science Fiction. He edited the magazine from its inception in 1949 as The Magazine of Fantasy. In the fall of 1954 he left the magazine as an active editor but continued in the role of advisory editor until 1962.

During the 1950s, McComas reviewed science fiction for The New York Times.

He left to the San Francisco Public Library his collection of 3,000 volumes of fiction and 92 science fiction magazines dating from the 1920s.
