= P. Schuyler Miller =

American novelist (1912–1974)

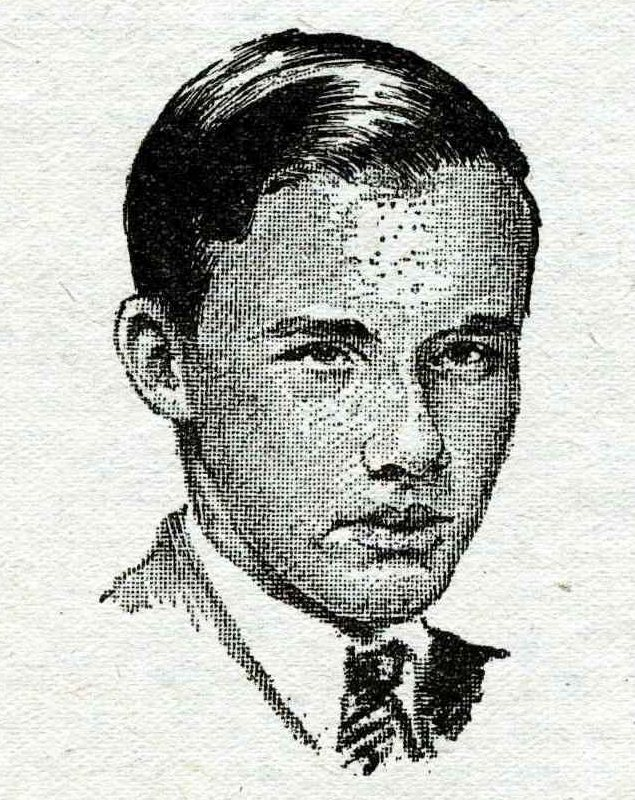
- Born: February 21, 1912; Troy, New York, U.S.
- Died: October 13, 1974 (aged 62); Blennerhassett Island, West Virginia, U.S.
- Occupations: Author and critic, technical writer
- Writing career
- Genre: Science fiction

Peter Schuyler Miller (February 21, 1912 – October 13, 1974) was an American science fiction writer and critic.

== Life ==
Miller was raised in New York's Mohawk Valley, which led to a lifelong interest in the Iroquois Indians. He pursued this as an amateur archaeologist and a member of the New York State Archaeological Association.

He received his M.S. in chemistry from Union College in Schenectady. He subsequently worked as a technical writer for General Electric in the 1940s, and for the Fisher Scientific Company in Pittsburgh from 1952 until his death.

Miller died October 13, 1974, on Blennerhassett Island, West Virginia. He was on an archaeological tour to the "Fort Ancient culture" site west of Parkersburg at the time.

== Works ==
Miller wrote pulp science fiction beginning in the 1930s, and is considered one of the more popular authors of the period. His work appeared in such magazines as Amazing Stories, Astounding, Comet, The Magazine of Fantasy and Science Fiction, Marvel Tales, Science Fiction Digest, Super Science Stories, Unknown, Weird Tales, and Wonder Stories, among others.

With his friend John D. Clark, Miller is also known as a bibliographer of Robert E. Howard's "Conan" stories. The two worked out an outline of Conan's career and a map of the world in Howard's work in 1936 from the then-published stories. Their map became the basis of maps that later appeared in the book editions of the Conan stories. Their revised outline, "A Probable Outline of Conan's Career" was published in the fanzine The Hyborian Age in 1938.

Miller began a shift to book reviewing in 1945, writing for Astounding Science Fiction, later renamed Analog, for which he wrote a monthly review column, "The Reference Library", from 1951 to 1963. As a critic he was notable for his enthusiasm for a wide coverage of the science fiction field. He was awarded a special Hugo Award for book reviews in 1963.

After his death his sister Mary E. Drake donated his extensive collection of papers, maps, books and periodicals, accumulated largely as a result of his review work, to the Carnegie Museum. They now form the basis of the P. Schuyler Miller Memorial Library at the Edward O'Neill Research Center in Pittsburgh.

== Bibliography ==
=== Short fiction ===
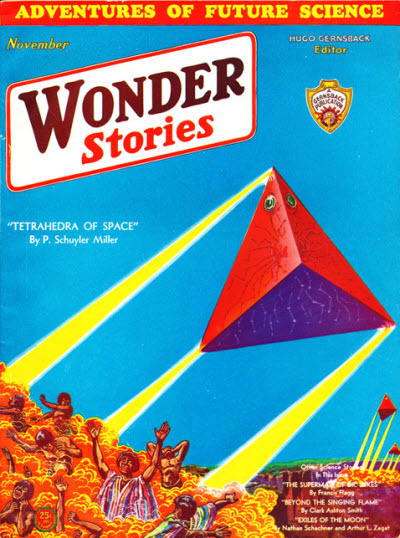
Miller's's novelette "Tetrahedra of Space" was the cover story in the November 1931 Wonder Stories

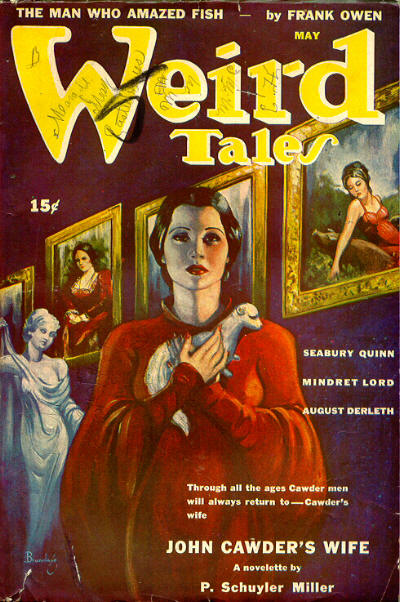
Miller's's novelette "John Cawder's Wife" was the cover story in the May 1943 Weird Tales

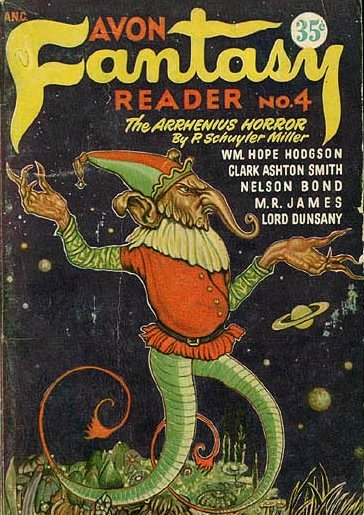
"The Arrhenius Horror" was republished in a 1947 issue of Avon Fantasy Reader.

- "The Red Plague" (Jul. 1930)
- "Dust of Destruction" (Feb. 1931)
- "Through the Vibrations" (May 1931)
- "Cleon of Yzdral" (Jul. 1931)
- "The Man from Mars" (Sum. 1931)
- "The Arrhenius Horror" (Sep. 1931)
- "Tetrahedra of Space" (Nov. 1931)
- "Red Spot on Jupiter" (1931) (with Paul McDermott and Walter Dennis)
- "Duel on the Asteroid" (Jan. 1932) (with Paul McDermott and Walter Dennis)
- "Forgotten" (also known as "The Forgotten Man of Space") (Apr. 1933)
- "Red Flame of Venus" (Sep. 1932)
- "Jeremiah Jones, Alchemist" (May 1933)
- "Alicia in Blunderland" (1933)
- "The Atom Smasher" (Jan. 1934)
- "The Pool of Life" (Oct. 1934)
- "The Titan" (Win. 1934–35)
- "The People of the Arrow" (Jul. 1935)
- "The Chrysalis" (Apr. 1936)
- "The Sands of Time" (Apr. 1937)
- "Coils of Time" (May 1939)
- "Pleasure Trove" (Aug. 1939)
- "Spawn" (Aug. 1939)
- "In the Good Old Summertime" (Mar. 1940)
- "Living Isotopes" (May 1940)
- "The Flayed Wolf" (Jul. 1940)
- "Old Man Mulligan" (Dec. 1940)
- "Trouble on Tantalus" (Feb. 1941)
- "Bird Walk" (Apr. 1941)
- "Over the River" (Apr. 1941)
- "The Facts of Life" (May 1941)
- "Smugglers of the Moon" (May 1941)
- "The Frog" (Oct. 1942)
- "The Cave" (Jan. 1943)
- "John Cawder's Wife" (May 1943)
- "The Hounds of Kalimar" (Jun. 1943)
- "Gleeps" (Jul. 1943)
- "Fricassee in Four Dimensions" (Dec. 1943)
- "As Never Was" (Jan. 1944)
- "Cuckoo" (May 1944)
- "Plane and Fancy" (Jul. 1944)
- "Ship-in-a-Bottle" (Jan. 1945)
- "Ghost" (Jul. 1946)
- "The Thing on Outer Shoal" (Sep. 1947)
- "Daydream" (1949)
- "Status Quondam" (1951)
- "For Analysis" (Nov. 1958)

=== Verse ===
- "Man's Question" (Jun. 1931)
- "Meteor" (Aug. 1931)
- "Space" (Feb. 1933)

=== Novels ===
- Genus Homo (1941, rv.1950) (with L. Sprague de Camp)

=== Collections ===
- The Titan (1952)

== Sources ==
- Moskowitz, Sam. Obituary, in Analog, February 1975.
- Moskowitz, Sam (1975). A Canticle for P. Schuyler Miller.
- Obituary in Pennsylvania Archaeologist, Vol 46, no. 1/2.
- Catalogue of the Fantasy and Science Fiction Library of the Late P. Schuyler Miller (1977).
