= Donald H. Tuck =

Australian bibliographer of science fiction and fantasy (1922–2010)

- Born: Donald Henry Tuck; 3 December 1922 Launceston, Tasmania, Australia
- Died: 11 October 2010 (aged 87) Melbourne, Victoria, Australia
- Occupation: Bibliographer
- Education: University of Tasmania
- Subject: Science fiction
- Years active: 1941–1983
- Spouse: Audrey Cranston (m. 1954; died 2010)

Donald Henry Tuck (3 December 1922 – 11 October 2010) was an Australian bibliographer of science fiction, fantasy and weird fiction. His works were "among the most extensive produced since the pioneering work of Everett F. Bleiler."

== Biography ==
Tuck was born in Launceston, Tasmania, but his family soon moved to Hobart, where his father was associate professor of electrical engineering at the University of Tasmania.

From a young age Tuck was interested in all aspects of science. In his teens he discovered the gaudy American science fiction magazines on sale in local department stores and began collecting them. He located other SF fans in Hobart and together they produced the first Tasmanian science fiction fanzine, Profan, which had three issues between April and September 1941. Each included an author's biography and index to their published stories, demonstrating Tuck's early interest in bibliography.

During the war, Tuck trained as a radio technician before serving in the Australian Electrical and Mechanical Engineers Corps on Horn and Thursday Islands in the Torres Strait. Afterward he completed his science degree at the University of Tasmania and then joined EZ Industries (EZ) at Risdon, near Hobart. Starting as a technical librarian, Tuck would spend his entire career with this company, rising through the ranks.

He maintained his interest in SF as a correspondent and collector. A list of paperbacks sent to him by Perth fan Roger Dard inspired Tuck to begin compiling a card index to SF, fantasy and weird literature published in various forms. Acquiring bibliographic data from contacts around the world, Tuck expanded his card index and self-published it as a book titled A Handbook of Science Fiction and Fantasy in January 1954. It received enthusiastic reviews in the three leading SF magazines of the day.

Tuck married Audrey Jean Cranston in May 1954. He continued to expand his Handbook; the second edition was published in 1959 and received a "Special Hugo" at the World Science Fiction Convention in 1962.

The couple established a home in Lindisfarne, on Hobart's eastern shore, and had a son in 1961. The Tucks hosted regular informal gatherings by local and visiting SF fans at Lindisfarne for the next 20 years, with regular visitor A. Bertram Chandler commemorating the locale by naming one of the spaceship bases in his novels after it.

The culmination of Tuck's efforts was the publication of The Encyclopedia of Science Fiction and Fantasy: a bibliographic survey of the fields of science fiction, fantasy and weird fiction through 1968 by Advent:Publishers in three volumes between 1974 and 1983. His work continued to win recognition: the annual Big Heart Award for service to the SF community in 1975, a special World Fantasy Award in 1979 for volumes 1 and 2, and the Hugo Award for Best Nonfiction Book in 1984 for volume 3. Volume 2 also placed second and volume 3 third for the Locus Awards to the year's best nonfiction or reference book.

Tuck was also invited to be Australian Guest of Honour at the first Aussiecon in 1975. A very private person, he was initially reluctant, but did accept the invitation. As the date of the convention approached, however, commitments arose which he felt required his presence at Electrolytic Zinc. He was Acting Head of Industrial Services at the Risdon plant at this time and drastic falls in zinc prices had led to job losses and industrial action. His decision proved controversial, overshadowing his hosting several groups of fans in Hobart after the convention. (During one visit he was presented with the E.E. Evans Memorial Big Heart Award for 1975 by Forrest J. Ackerman).

Tuck retired from the zinc factory in 1982 and dispatched his extensive SF collection to university libraries in Perth and Brisbane. The Tucks moved to Melbourne and enjoyed an active retirement before Audrey died in August 2010 and Don followed her six weeks later.

== Bibliography ==
- A Handbook of Science Fiction and Fantasy (1954, self-published, Hobart)
- A Handbook of Science Fiction and Fantasy, 2nd ed. (1959, self-published, Hobart)
- The Encyclopedia of Science Fiction and Fantasy (Advent:Publishers, Chicago). Published in three volumes:
  - Vol 1: Who's Who, A–L (1974)
  - Vol 2: Who's Who, M–Z (1978)
  - Vol 3: Miscellaneous (1983)
