= Advent:Publishers =

American publishing house

- Founded: October 24, 1955
- Founder: Earl Kemp; Sidney Coleman; Edward Wood; Robert E[dward] Briney, Jr. Jon Stopa
- Country of origin: United States
- Headquarters location: Illinois, United States
- Nonfiction topics: Criticism, history and bibliography of science fiction
- Fiction genres: Science fiction

Advent:Publishers is an American publishing house. It was founded by Earl Kemp and other members of the University of Chicago Science Fiction Club, including Sidney Coleman, in 1955, to publish criticism, history, and bibliography of the science fiction field, beginning with Damon Knight's In Search of Wonder.

With books like In Search of Wonder and James Blish's The Issue at Hand, Advent became the genre's first scholarly publisher.

== Authors ==
Authors in the field who have either written or edited Advent books, or been the subject of an Advent book, include:

- Cy Chauvin
- Reginald Bretnor
- Theodore Cogswell
- Robert A. Heinlein
- Cyril Kornbluth
- Alfred Bester
- Robert Bloch
- L. Sprague de Camp
- Howard DeVore
- E. E. Smith
- Ron Ellik
- Lloyd Arthur Eshbach
- Damon Knight
- Alexei Panshin
- Donald H. Tuck
- Harry Warner Jr

== Footnotes on First Beginnings: Advent & the UofCSF Club... ==
After exchanging a few letters with Mari Wolf (who was conducting "Fandora's Box" for William Hamling’s Imagination), she insisted upon connecting me with local Chicago active fan Ed Wood. In fear and trepidation, at her insistence and by prearrangement, I went to meet the exalted co-editor of the Journal of Science Fiction.

— Earl Kemp

And then Ed Wood introduced Earl Kemp to the University of Chicago Science Fiction Club, and a publishing legend was begun.

Evan H. Appelman was the president of the UofCSF Club when Earl Kemp joined in 1950. Originally sponsored by a university professor, the club had been in existence a number of years prior to then when Kemp became a member. Appelman and Kemp hit it off really good, and Appelman picked him and encouraged him to become president when he retired (graduated). He further set it up so that Kemp could do so for public consumption, but internally Rick Pararie, a student, was alleged president. Things continued with the full support of the university without a bobble even with Kemp in charge. George Price, also not a student was the president after his term expired.

Edward Wood (April 28, 1926 – 1995) was one of the original five co-founders of Advent:Publishers which was formed October 24, 1955, by Chicago fans Earl Kemp, Edward Wood (deceased), Sidney Coleman (deceased 2007), Robert E. Briney (deceased 2011), and Jon Stopa. It was initially formed for only one purpose, to publish the Damon Knight book that became In Search of Wonder (originally titled Rx Science Fiction). Collectors should note that a “secret” printing run of 100 brown paperbacks copies of In Search of Wonder were published as a market test. They sold out immediately.

Robert E[dward] Briney, Jr. (2 Dec 1933 - 25 Nov 2011) was a noted science fiction and mystery fan, and was a founding member of Advent:Publishers, Inc. He graduated from high school in 1951. By 1961 he had earned a Ph.D. in mathematics from M.I.T. In 1968 Briney joined the faculty of Salem State College as a professor of mathematics and in 1977 founded Salem State's Computer Science Department. His early period as a fan of science fiction was highlighted by the self-publication of Shanadu (SSR Pubs., Tonawanda, 1953, 101 pp., $1.50), an anthology containing three stories: "Quest of the Veil," by Thomas Eugene DeWeese, “The Fire- Born,” by Toby Duane (pseudonym of W. Paul Ganley—a founding member, along with Ken Krueger, of the Buffalo Fantasy League), and “The Black Tower,” by Brian J. McNaughton & Andrew Duane (pseudonym of R.E. Briney).

Upon Briney's departure from SSR Pubs. (Snappy Space Rocket Publications), all titles and rights passed to Ken Krueger, publisher of Shroud: Publishers.

Due to their initial success with In Search of Wonder, now confident in their efforts, the group continued with their publishing organization for over sixty years. Among some of their noteworthy works, Ed Wood, together with fellow Advent co-owner, Bob Briney, compiled SF Bibliographies: An Annotated Bibliography of Bibliographical Works on Science Fiction and Fantasy Fiction (Advent:Publishers, Inc., Chicago, IL, 1972, 49 pp., $1.95).

On May 25, 1957, Advent:Publishers incorporated, Jim O’Meara and George Price were added as two additional partners. Equal shares were sold to finance the initial, and later, offerings and continued to pay a percentage annually. (Of note: Officially, there is no space following the colon.)

Among the various partners, Earl Kemp was the original driving force, selecting works for publication. George Price, another partner added on in 1957, became the typesetter, following Earl Kemp who typeset the first Advent productions and was instrumental in orchestrating the production of the brilliant Frank Kelly Freas portfolio. Ed Wood was the editorial director, consulting with the various writers over content and motivating them to deliver the works on time, as promised. Sidney Coleman acted as treasurer in the early years. Jon Stopa did the original book design. Bob Briney and James O’Meara (another partner added in 1957) acted as silent partners.

Advent began with a more general program including nonfiction, an art portfolio, and an anthology. Their first, and only, anthology, by fellow Chicagoan Ted Dikty and a partner at Shasta Publishers, which continued a series originated at Frederick Fell Publishers, Inc. but done for the mass market instead—and recently discontinued by that mass market publisher ( Doubleday )—was terminated after only one book when Dikty, not long out of Shasta, demanded a full share of Advent, and according to Advent, editorial control. Dikty denied the later but pointed out at the time that his anthology was selling, even better and faster than any of the early ones he had done with E. F. Bleiler, even to the Doubleday SF Book Club, and clearly could carry the line, so he believed a share wasn't out of the question.

The partners saw it differently, and decided to drop Dikty, and stick from that point on to the one thing they could all agree on: nonfiction about the science fiction and fantasy field. This turn of events, while unplanned, oddly insured their long-term survival.

According to the rules of incorporation, which required corporate offices and records be maintained in Illinois, in 1965 when Earl Kemp left Chicago to follow William Hamling to San Diego as Vice President of Greenleaf Classics, the position of manager of Advent passed to George Price, the only legal resident of Illinois. Under his excellent and firm control, Advent outlasted all the other original specialty publishers of the post-WWII era and remained in the hands of all the original partners for the next fifty years.

Price continued to do the typesetting and cover design. Ed Wood not only did the editorial work but also took care of the shipping end, keeping some stock handy while the rest was stored at their printers, Malloy Printing and Lithography in Ann Arbor, Michigan, and shipped out in cartons as sales warranted.

Among several high-points, Advent also generated controversy with their publication of Alexei Panshin’s critical work of Robert A. Heinlein. Heinlein in Dimension (Advent:Publishers, Inc., 1968, x/198, $6.00) was the first in-depth look at the work of Grandmaster Heinlein’s till then unquestioned mastery of the genre. Heinlein was so upset when he heard about the pending publication he personally threatened Earl Kemp, and Advent, with a lawsuit unless they desisted. Heinlein never sued either.

But with the insistence of George Price, the Advent Boys pulled together, and published Panshin’s masterwork. Heinlein remained bitter, forever cutting off longtime friend Earl Kemp from his once close connection, and cutting Panshin by turning his back to him, and refusing to shake his hand in peer recognition. Panshin's own views on the matter can be found on his website The Abyss of Wonder.

In 2001 Advent:Publishers, breaking with their nearly fifty year tradition of only printing works of non-fiction, printed the last of E. E. Smith's unpublished fiction works: Have Trenchcoat—Will Travel, and Others: A Novel of Suspense, and Three Short Stories (Advent:Publishers, Inc., Chicago, IL, 2001, 274 pp., $20.00). From the Advent:Publishers advertising blurb: "This book is not science fiction. The disclaimer is necessary because the late Edward Elmer "Doc" Smith made his literary name in writing science fiction. He was one of the earliest writers of interstellar and intergalactic adventure stories, fondly referred to as "space opera". His Skylark novels began to appear in the science fiction magazines in 1928, followed by his epic Lensman series starting in 1937. Doc's literary estate has now released to Advent the four stories that make up this book; they have never before been published. So far as we know, these are Doc's only stories that are not science fiction or fantasy. Advent usually publishes only non-fiction related to science fiction, such as criticism or bibliography; we are bringing out this book primarily because of its associational interest to Doc Smith's many fans."

In 2014, Advent was transferred to ReAnimus Press, which has continued to publish new Advent titles and republish the existing titles.

== Works published by Advent:Publishers ==
- In Search of Wonder, by Damon Knight (1956)
- Frank Kelly Freas: A Portfolio, by Frank Kelly Freas (1957)
- The Best Science Fiction Stories and Novels: Ninth Series, edited by T. E. Dikty (1958)
- The Science Fiction Novel, edited by Earl Kemp (1959)
- Some Notes on Xi Bootis, by Hal Clement (1960)
- The Eighth Stage of Fandom, by Robert Bloch (1962)
- The Proceedings: CHICON III, edited by Earl Kemp (1963)
- The Proceedings: DISCON, edited by Richard Eney (1964)
- A Requiem For Astounding, by Alva Rogers (1964)
- Of Worlds Beyond, edited by Lloyd Arthur Eshbach (1964)
- The Issue at Hand, by William Atheling, Jr. (1964)
- The Universes of E. E. Smith, by Ron Ellik and Bill Evans (1966)
- Heinlein in Dimension, by Alexei Panshin (1968)
- All Our Yesterdays, by Harry Warner, Jr. (1969)
- More Issues at Hand, by William Atheling, Jr. (1970)
- SF Bibliographies, by Robert E. Briney and Edward Wood (1972)
- The Encyclopedia of Science Fiction and Fantasy, Volume 1, compiled by Donald H. Tuck (1974)
- SF in Dimension, by Alexei Panshin and Cory Panshin (1976)
- The Encyclopedia of Science Fiction and Fantasy, Volume 2, compiled by Donald H. Tuck (1978)
- Modern Science Fiction, edited by Reginald Bretnor (1979)
- Footprints on Sand, by L. Sprague de Camp and Catherine Crook de Camp (1981)
- The Encyclopedia of Science Fiction and Fantasy, Volume 3, compiled by Donald H. Tuck (1982) (Hugo Award winner)
- Galaxy Magazine: The Dark and the Light Years, by David L. Rosheim (1986)
- The Tale That Wags the God, by James Blish (1987)
- PITFCS: Proceedings of the Institute for Twenty-First Century Studies, edited by Theodore R. Cogswell (1992) (Hugo Award nominee)
- The Hugo, Nebula and World Fantasy Awards, by Howard DeVore (1998) (Hugo Award nominee)
- Have Trenchcoat—Will Travel, by Edward E. Smith (2001)
- Heinlein's Children, by Joseph T. Major (2006) (Hugo Award nominee)
- Sense of Wonder, by Gardner Dozois (2018)
- Being Gardner Dozois, by Michael Swanwick (2018)
- The Reading Protocols of Science Fiction: Discourses on Reading SF, by James E. Gunn and Michael R. Page (2021)
