= The Sorcerer's Ship =

1969 novel by Hannes Bok

- Cover of first edition
- Author: Hannes Bok
- Cover artist: Ray Cruz
- Language: English
- Series: Ballantine Adult Fantasy series
- Genre: Fantasy novel
- Publisher: Ballantine Books
- Publication date: 1969
- Publication place: United States
- Media type: Print (Paperback)
- Pages: xi, 205 p.
- ISBN: 0-345-21795-0

The Sorcerer's Ship is a fantasy novel by Hannes Bok. It was first published in the December 1942 issue of the magazine Unknown, and was first published in book form in paperback by Ballantine Books as the ninth volume of the Ballantine Adult Fantasy series in December 1969. The Ballantine edition includes an introduction by Lin Carter. The novel has also been published in translation in Polish and Russian. Like much of Bok's fiction, it is the story of a traveler "from our world who found [himself] in colourful, magic lands that are far more attractive than our own".

== Plot summary ==
A man named Gene finds himself cast into a new world by a powerful godlike being. Gene has been changed in such a way that he has every talent needed to survive this new world, including the ability to understand the language of its inhabitants. Gene is rescued from the seemingly endless oceans of this new world by a passing ship that is similar to the looks of a Viking galley. Aboard the ship he makes himself useful as best he can while meeting new friends and enemies. Eventually they come to an island where a mysterious creature who some see as a friend, and some see as an enemy, joins them aboard their ship to help deal with the threat of war from their neighboring kingdom known as Koph. The creature, utilizing his sorcerer-like abilities is employed by the other country known as Nanich to help aid them in the war, but will the sorcerer, and his magic be enough to save the land of Nanich from being overrun by Koph?

== Main characters ==
Gene Trevelli: The main protagonist of the story. Originally from New York City, he was on vacation swimming when in the middle of almost drowning he got sucked into another world. Throughout the book Gene tries his hardest to fit in with the people who saved him from drifting in the ocean. Throughout the story Gene is very confused about the new world he has been dropped into, but tries his hardest to fit in.

Siwara: The princess of Nanich, a naive young woman who believes that there can be peace between Koph and Nanich, much to the disdain of her mentor Kaspel.

Kaspel: Siwara's Mentor. An old man who wears blue robes. A very logical, and calculating man but also a man with a kind heart, a fatherly love of Siwara, and an equal love of his country.

Froar: Another of Siwara's Mentors. A cold-hearted, treacherous, self-serving man with a love for power. the book often describes that He has a very gravely voice and a wild stare. his motivation is the manipulation of Siwara to get what he desires.

Yanuk: An immortal chubby anthropomorphic fish-like creature with amazing psychic abilities. Yanuk is very trusting and happy to have the company of other people after being alone for probably centuries by himself while he honed his powers. His amazing gifts were granted to him by a very powerful being named Orcher. at times he sees his gift of immortality as punishment rather than a blessing, and has been very, very lonely.

Orcher: A seemingly omnipotent being so powerful that he has supposedly made, and is in control of more than one whole universe. Siwara summons him with the help of Yanuk to get his aid to help defend against the invasion of Koph.

== Reception ==
James Cawthorn compared the novel to A. Merritt's The Ship of Ishtar, noting that because Bok's writing was more restrained, "the reader is never really gripped by the plight of the principal characters, and the overall effect is unsatisfying". E. F. Bleiler similarly found Sorcerer's Ship less effective than Bok's collaborations with Merritt, declaring it "Not too satisfying". The Encyclopedia of Fantasy describes Bok's novels as "stronger in imagery and wordplay than in plot or characterization".
