= Lawrence Sterne Stevens =

American illustrator

Lawrence Stevens
- Born: Lawrence Sterne Stevens; December 4, 1884; Pontiac, Michigan, United States
- Died: December 1960 (aged 75–76); Norwalk, Connecticut, United States
- Known for: Illustration

Lawrence Sterne Stevens (December 4, 1884 – 1960) was an American pulp fantasy and science fiction illustrator.

He is known for his interior story illustrations for Argosy and cover paintings for Adventure, Amazing, A. Merritt's Fantasy Magazine, Famous Fantastic Mysteries, and Fantastic Novels.

== Biography ==
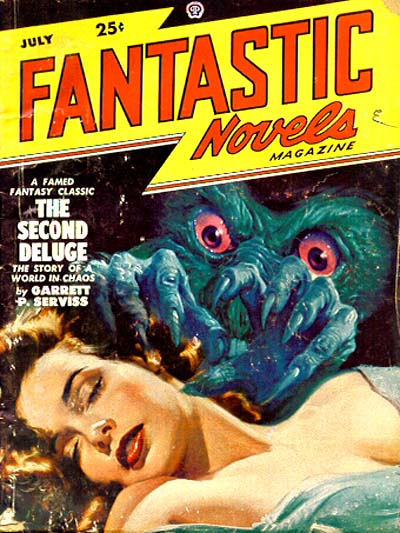
Fantastic Novels, July 1948, cover illustration by New Publications / Lawrence Sterne Stevens

Born to the Reverend Lawrence Sterne Stevens, M.A., Rector of the Zion Protestant Episcopal Church and Kate Stevens, he was the youngest of seven.

In 1905 he moved to Minneapolis to work as a newspaper pressman and cartoonist for The Minneapolis Journal. He studied under the German born artist, Robert Koehler. With the encouragement of Koehler and Alphonse Mucha, Lawrence Stevens moved to Belgium in 1910 to study at the Royal Academy of Fine Arts (Antwerp).

He joined the U. S. Navy in 1914 serving as a cartographer and was captured by the Germans and accused of spying. After the war he returned to Belgium to study art at the Académie Royale des Beaux-Arts.

He married in 1919 and had a son, Peter Stevens, who was also to become a pulp artist.

From 1925 to 1937 Lawrence Stevens worked as a designer and illustrator for the General Motors Company in Brussels and Antwerp.

In 1941 he began his career as a freelance illustrator in New York City. Lawrence Sterne Stevens and his father the Reverend had exactly the same name, so to avoid confusion, he signed his work with only his first name, "Lawrence."

In 1943 he drew interior story illustrations for Argosy. From 1948 to 1953 he painted covers for Amazing, A. Merritt's Fantasy Magazine, Famous Fantastic Mysteries, and Fantastic Novels. In 1953 at age sixty-nine he retired from professional illustration.
