= Captain Zero =

Captain Zero may refer to:

- Captain Zero (magazine), a pulp magazine
- Captain Zero, a character in Tugs (TV series)

== See also ==
- Captain Z-Ro
- Captain Hero
- Captain Nero
