= Cosmos (serial novel) =

1933 collaborative novel

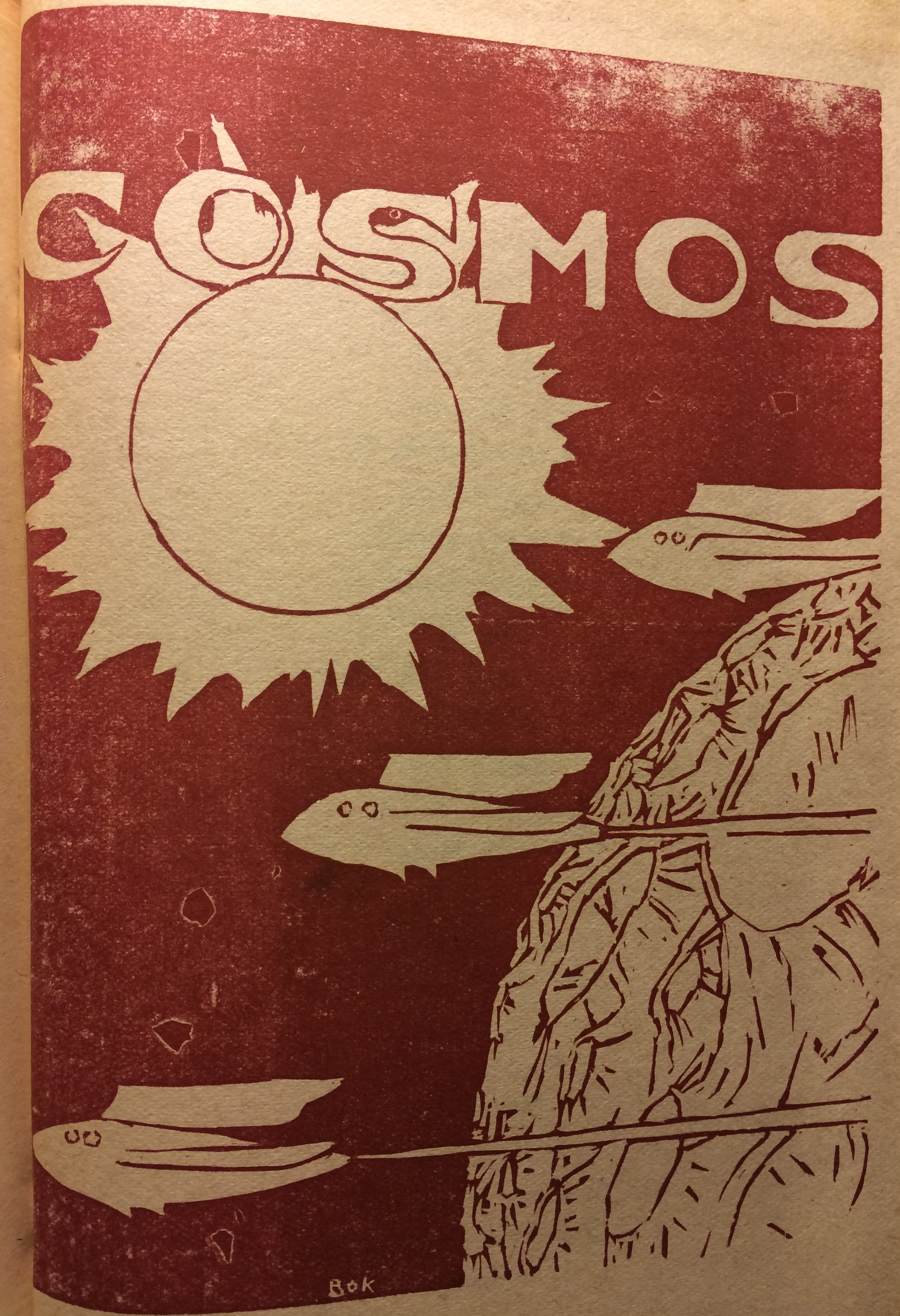
Illustration included with the final chapter (17) of the novel; by Hannes Bok

Cosmos is a serial novel consisting of seventeen chapters written by seventeen authors. The novel appeared in issues of the science fiction fan publication Science Fiction Digest (later Fantasy Magazine) published from July, 1933 through January, 1935.

Cosmos has been described variously as "the world's most fabulous serial," "one of the unique stunts of early science fiction," and "a failure, miserable and near-complete."

== Plot summary ==
The opening chapter of Cosmos introduces the two primary protagonists of the novel: Dos-Tev, deposed Emperor of the planet Lemnis of the Alpha Centauri system, and his science advisor, Mea-Quin. Dos-Tev becomes aware that his usurper, Ay-Artz, is planning to extend his conquest to the planets of the Solar System. Unbeknown to Ay-Artz, Dos-Tev and Mea-Quin have created a ship capable of traveling faster than the speed of light. In order to foil Ay-Artz's plans and regain his throne, Dos-Tev sets out for the Solar System and establishes a base in the crater Copernicus on Earth's moon. He then proceeds to contact the races of the Solar System to enlist their aid in defending their planets once Ay-Artz's slower armada arrives.

Chapters 2 through 5 describe the inhabitants of Mercury (a small band of human emigrants from Earth), Jupiter's moon Callisto (a race led by women), Mars (a race resembling large flying squirrels), and Saturn (cone-shaped beings who communicate via color) respectively. Each planet receives a message of warning from Dos-Tev and a request to send an emissary to an interplanetary conference to be held at Copernicus, and following a variety of adventures, each dispatches a ship accordingly.

Chapter 6 returns to the story of Dos-Tev and Mea-Quin on the Moon as they continue to contact the planets of the Solar System and prepare for the conference. They encounter resistance from a strange, intelligent force they refer to as "the Wrongness of Space."

Chapters 7 through 9 tell the tales of Neptune (peopled by sentient gas-filled balloons), Venus (inhabited by migrated Earthlings), and Earth as they receive Dos-Tev's warning, select their emissaries and send ships to represent their planets at the conference. We learn that the people of Earth have been subtly subjugated by automatons of their own creation.

In Chapter 10, Dos-Tev and Mea-Quin complete their preparations for the conference, despite interference from the Wrongness of Space. They successfully host the representatives of the planets and enlist them to return to their homes and build fleets of spaceships to defend the Solar System against Ay-Artz.

In Chapter 11, the Earth is freed from the dominion of the automatons by a reclusive poet-musician-scientist. (This chapter, written by A. Merritt, was later adapted and republished as a short story named "Rhythm of the Spheres.")

Chapter 12 describes a failed attempt by Dos-Tev and Mea-Quin to dispose of the Wrongness of Space. They discover that it is Krzza of Lxyia, a mad inter-dimensional dictator in league with Ay-Artz. Krzza captures them and then uses their communications equipment to direct false instructions to the planetary fleets intended to send them to their doom.

Chapters 13, 14 and 15 tell the stories of the fleets of Earth, Neptune and Saturn as they cope with the disastrous misdirection sent to them by Krzza.

In Chapter 16, Dos-Tev and Mea-Quin manage to escape the clutches of Krzza and make their way back to their ship. After defeating Krzza, they find their communication gear destroyed and must depart the Moon at maximum velocity to rendezvous with the Earth fleet.

In the concluding Chapter 17, Dos-Tev and Mea-Quin reach the Earth fleet. They pass on intelligence regarding Ay-Artz's imminent arrival, but the intense gravitational stress of their journey kills them. The Solar System fleets converge under the command of Earth's Flight Director. After a titanic battle, the forces of Ay-Artz are defeated–while Pluto, Neptune and Uranus are completely destroyed in the process.

== Contributors ==
The contributing authors were (in order of the publication of their chapters):

- Ralph Milne Farley
- David H. Keller, M.D.
- Arthur J. Burks
- Bob Olsen
- Francis Flagg
- John W. Campbell
- Rae Winters (pseudonym of Raymond A. Palmer)
- Otis Adelbert Kline and E. Hoffmann Price
- Abner J. Gelula
- Raymond A. Palmer
- A. Merritt
- J. Harvey Haggard
- Edward E. Smith, Ph.D.
- P. Schuyler Miller
- Lloyd Arthur Eshbach
- Eando Binder
- Edmond Hamilton

=== Later impact of contributors ===
Several of the editors and authors responsible for Cosmos later became editors and/or publishers of professional science fiction magazines. Specifically:

- Raymond A. Palmer, literary editor of Science Fiction Digest, became the editor of Amazing Stories in 1938.
- Julius Schwartz, managing editor, joined the company that was to become DC Comics in 1944 and was later responsible for editing the Superman and Batman titles.
- Mort Weisinger, associate editor, was named editor of Thrilling Wonder Stories and other pulps in 1936, and later served as an editor at DC Comics.
- Forrest J Ackerman, "Scientifilm Editor," founded the magazine Famous Monsters of Filmland in 1958.
- John W. Campbell, author of Chapter Six of Cosmos, became the editor of Astounding Science Fiction in 1937.
- Lloyd Arthur Eshbach, author of Chapter Fifteen of Cosmos, was the founder of Fantasy Press.

=== Subsequent works ===
Although Fantasy Magazine never produced a sequel to Cosmos or another collaborative work on the same scale, they did reprise the concept for a pair of round-robin short stories as a special feature for their third-anniversary, which appeared in the September, 1935 issue. Both stories shared the title "The Challenge From Beyond". One was set in the fantasy genre, the other science fiction. The two stories were not related beyond the title and format of authorship. Ten authors participated, five on each story.

Fantasy:

- H.P. Lovecraft
- Robert E. Howard
- C.L. Moore
- A. Merritt
- Frank Belknap Long

Science-fiction:

- Stanley G. Weinbaum
- Donald Wandrei
- Edward E. Smith
- Harl Vincent
- Murray Leinster

== Historical commentary ==
The creation of Cosmos has been featured in histories of science fiction and fandom, primarily as an interesting event rather than an important contribution to the literature. For example:

"Although Science Fiction Digest carried fiction, that was not its main feature. Palmer, however, sought to remedy that by instigating a novelty in the form of a round-robin story to be published as a supplement. The story had the overall title of Cosmos and ran for seventeen chapters, from July 1933 to January 1935. Palmer provided the outline, which was rather old-hat space opera, and then reached agreement with sixteen other authors to write the series...

The full line-up of writers in Cosmos was awesome… They were all top names in the pulps, but to be able to bring together both Merritt and Smith in one serial was a bonanza for all fans. Cosmos is far from great science fiction, and has to be read in the manner in which it was written. Most of the chapters can stand on their own and Merritt’s in particular, “The Last Poet and the Robots” (April 1934), which was voted the most popular, is a gem of a story. It is some measure of the affinity that existed between science-fiction devotees that writers were willing to spend time and contribute stories free of charge to the fan press while, at the same time, they were instigating legal proceedings against Huge Gernsback for recovery of unpaid fees for stories. It is the clear distinction between work done for fun and that for profit."

"While literary editor at Science Fiction Digest, Palmer arranged one of the unique stunts of early science fiction, the novel Cosmos, which consisted of seventeen chapters assigned to different authors, printed as a serial. Palmer loosely set up the plots of the chapters and adjusted them as new sections were turned in, giving authors plenty of room for invention. The authors included some prominent pulpsters and SF writers...

Cosmos was pure space opera–a pejorative term borrowed from the term 'horse opera,' indicating these were simply wild west stories with good guys and bad guys battling in outer space. The space opera, perpetually criticized, once its basic elements were recognized, would nevertheless rocket on through the decades, spawning hit television series, new religions, and a steady flow of Jedi to doors on Halloween. The first ban on space operas were announced in the early 1930s. In December 1933, F. Orlin Tremaine, then editor of Astounding Stories, announced a new emphasis on stories that provided 'thought variants'... Nevertheless, space operas abounded and continued to be fun. Cosmos was one."
