= Mary Gnaedinger =

American magazine editor (1897–1976)

- Born: Mary Catherine Jacobson; September 28, 1897; Brooklyn, New York, U.S.
- Died: July 31, 1976 (aged 78); The Bronx, New York, U.S.
- Occupation: Editor
- Genres: Fantasy and science fiction

Mary Catherine Gnaedinger (née Jacobson; September 28, 1897 – July 31, 1976) was an American editor of science fiction and fantasy pulp magazines.

== Education and career ==
Born in Brooklyn, New York, as Mary Catherine Jacobson, she attended the Columbia University School of Journalism. After stints as a society reporter for the Brooklyn Eagle newspaper and work for publishing company E. P. Dutton, she spent several decades of her career working in science fiction.

== Personal life ==
Mary Jacobson married Louis Beverley Nichol Gnaedinger (1898–1977), a Canadian from Montreal, on September 22, 1919. They probably met at the Columbia University School of Journalism, since both attended at the same time. They had one child, Arthur Beverly Gnaedinger (b. April 13, 1920). Louis B. Gnaedinger was a business reporter for the New York Times and other papers. The couple divorced, date unknown.

== Editorial work in science fiction ==
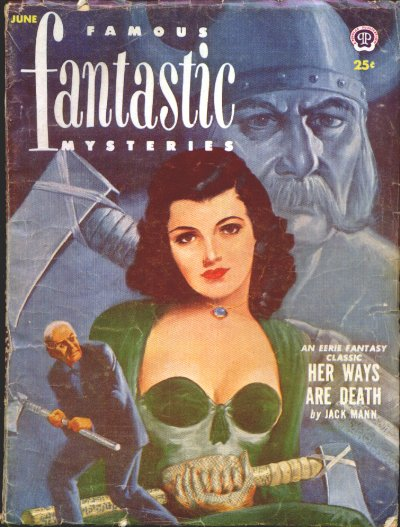
Cover of Famous Fantastic Mysteries, June 1952

In her career as an editor, Mary Gnaedinger became the editor of the science fiction and fantasy magazines Famous Fantastic Mysteries in 1939 and Fantastic Novels in 1940, as well as A. Merritt's Fantasy Magazine. She is known as the first female lead editor of a science fiction publication.

Gnaedinger was known for ardently interacting with her readers, basing the stories she printed in the magazines she edited on their requests, and commonly praising their knowledge of science fiction. In his obituary of Gnaedinger published in 1977, fantasy and science fiction author Lin Carter wrote:

I ... am going to miss Mary Gnaedinger, who died at her home in the Bronx at the age of 78 ... For nearly thirty years she edited Famous Fantastic Mysteries and ... Fantastic Novels and A. Merritt's Fantasy Magazine, and did yeoman service by tirelessly getting back into print many of the best of fantastic fiction. I owe her a personal debt, for it was in the pages of her magazines that I first read the great romances of H. Rider Haggard and A. Merritt, and such unusual works as Chesterton's The Man Who Was Thursday, Hodgson's The Boats of the 'Glen Carrig', Cutcliffe Hyne's The Lost Continent... She did good work for the cause of fantasy, and many readers beside myself are indebted to her.

Copies of Famous Fantastic Mysteries and Fantastic Novels, including issues edited by Mary Gnaedinger, can be found in the City Tech Science Fiction Collection.

== Career timeline ==
- 1933, June: joined Newsstand Publications (aka Graham Publications) to edit Romantic Love Secrets
- 1934, July: after Romantic Love Secrets folds, joins Munsey as Amita Fairgrieve's asst. ed. on All-Story Magazine, a love pulp
- 1936, March 11: spoke at Brooklyn's First Presbyterian Church on "Religion and Magazine Fiction"
- 1939, October: editor of Munsey's new pulp Famous Fantastic Mysteries; it lasts until June 1953 with Gnaedinger editing
- 1940, May: adds Fantastic Novels to her responsibilities
- 1940, October: adds Sea Novel Magazine to her responsibilities; it folds after two issues
- 1941, April: Fantastic Novels combined with Famous Fantastic Mysteries, i.e., cancelled
- 1941, May: takes over Crack-Shot Western; it folds after October issue
- 1941, October: adds Cowboy Movie Thrillers to her responsibilities; it lasts four issues
- 1942, October: Popular Publications purchases Munsey magazines, retaining Gnaedinger
- 1942, December: adds Love Novels Magazine to her responsibilities; it lasts until September 1954
- 1943, May: takes over air-pulp Battle Birds; it folds after May 1944 issue
- 1948, March: Fantastic Novels is revived with Gnaedinger editing
- 1948, October: adds Captain Zero to her responsibilities; it last three issues, November 1949 to March 1950
- 1951, July: adds .44 Western to her responsibilities
- 1953, May: edits four titles, Love Novels, Detective Story, Rangeland Romance, 15 Range Romances
