= The Moon Pool =

Fantasy novel by Abraham Merritt

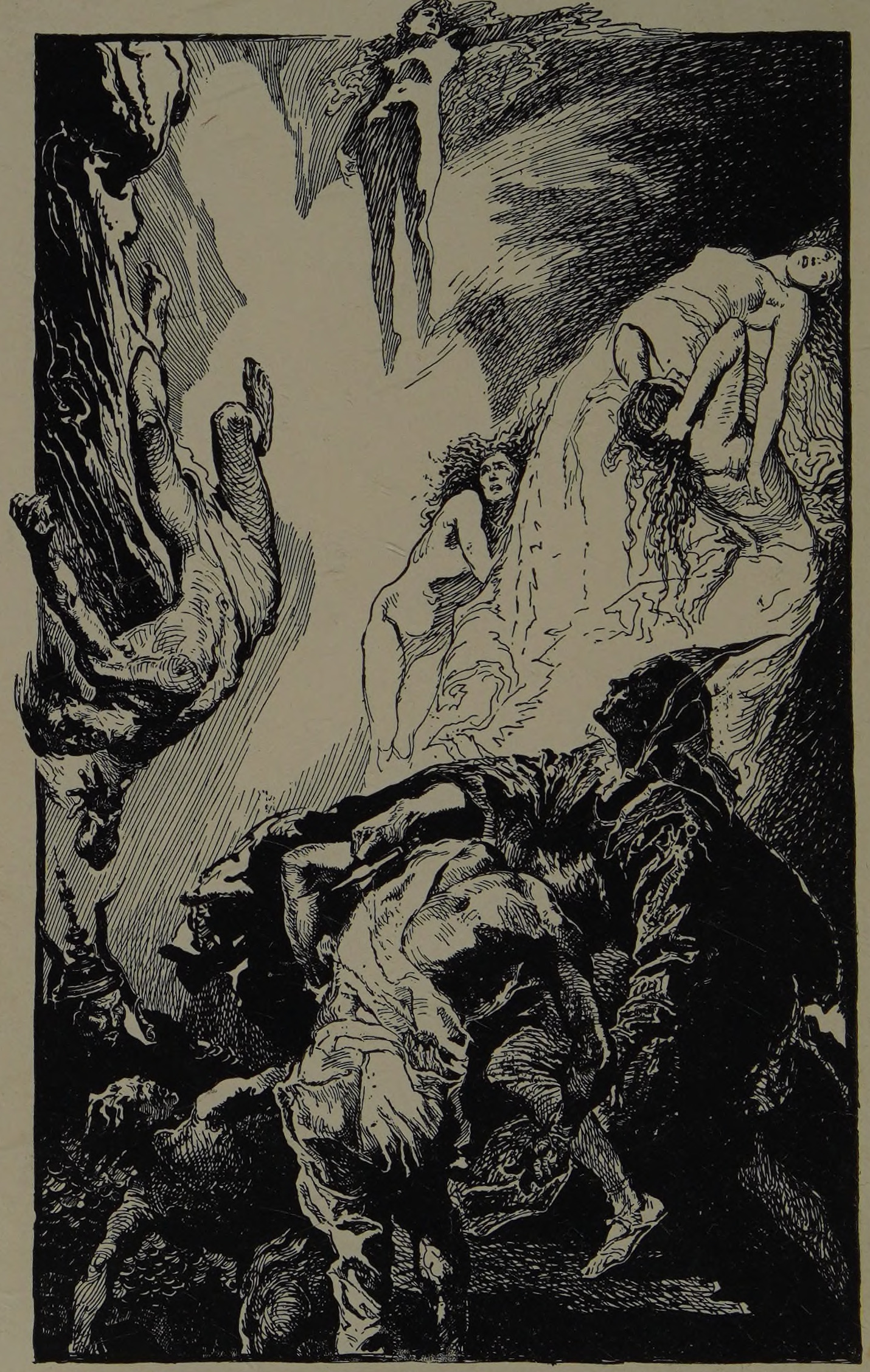
- Author: Abraham Merritt
- Cover artist: Joseph Clement Coll
- Language: English
- Series: "The Moon Pool"; June 22, 1918 "Conquest of the Moon Pool"; Weekly: February 15 – March 22, 1919
- Genre: Lost World; Fantasy
- Publisher: All-Story Weekly; Avon
- Publication date: 1919
- Publication place: United States
- Media type: Print (Serial, Hardback, and Paperback)
- Pages: 254
- OCLC: 23108182
- Followed by: The Metal Monster

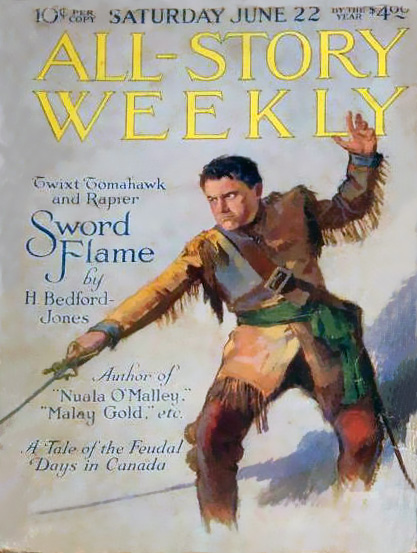
Argosy All-Story Weekly cover in which The Moon Pool was first published (June 22, 1918)

The Moon Pool is a fantasy novel by American writer Abraham Merritt. It originally appeared as two short stories in All-Story Weekly: "The Moon Pool" (1918) and its sequel, "Conquest of the Moon Pool" (1919). These were then reworked into a novel released in 1919. The protagonist, Dr. Goodwin, would later appear in Merritt's second novel The Metal Monster (1920).

Although Merritt did not invent the "lost world" novel—he followed in the footsteps of Bulwer-Lytton, Burroughs, Conan Doyle, and others—this work extended the tradition.

== Plot summary ==
The plot concerns an advanced race which has developed within the Earth's core. Eventually their three most intelligent members create an offspring. This created entity encompasses both great good and great evil, but it slowly turns away from its creators and towards evil. The entity is called either the Dweller or the Shining One.

The three creators are called the Silent Ones, and they have been 'purged of dross' and can be described as higher, nobler, more angelic beings than are humankind. They have also been sentenced by the good among their race to remain in the world, and not to die, as punishment for their pride which was the source of the calamity called the Dweller, until such time as they destroy their creation—if they still can. And the reason they do not do so is simply that they continue to love it.

The Dweller is in the habit of rising to the surface of the earth and capturing men and women whom it holds in an unholy stasis and who, in some ways, feed it. It increases its knowledge and power constantly, but has a weakness, since it is antithetical to love. The scientist Dr. Goodwin and the half-Irish, half-American pilot Larry O'Keefe, and others, follow it down. Eventually they meet a woman, beautiful and evil, named Yolara, who in essence serves the Shining One, and the 'handmaiden' of the Silent Ones, beautiful and good, named Lakla. Both want O'Keefe and eventually battle over him.

There is also a race of very powerful and handsome Polynesian-like 'dwarves' and a race of humanoids whom the Silent Ones developed from a semi-sentient froglike species.

There develops a battle between the forces of good and evil with not only the entire world, but perhaps even the existence of good itself at stake. But can the forces of good prevail using fear as a weapon? Or will they have to rely upon love expressed by willing sacrifice?

== Publication history ==
The book has been published a number of times. Some examples:

- 1919, US, G. P. Putnam's Sons, Pub date 1919
- 1944, US, Avon, Murder Mystery Monthly #18
- 1993, US. Carrol & Graf, "Masters of Fantasy" series
- 2001, US, University of Nebraska Press, OCLC 45284624, Pub date 2001, Paperback, Bison Frontiers of Imagination series, with introduction by Robert Silverberg
- 2004, US, Wesleyan University Press, OCLC 51580003, Pub date 2002, the Wesleyan Early Classics of Science Fiction series, with introduction by Michael M. Levy
- 2009, US, Overlook Press, OCLC 299803490, Pub date 2009, with introduction by Lynnette Porter

=== Collections ===
"The Moon Pool" has been collected in numerous general anthologies, including Volume 2 of The Road to Science Fiction (the 2002 edition by Scarecrow Press only) and Book 1 of The Ancient Mysteries Reader by Peter Haining. The original story was reprinted in The Mammoth Book of Fantasy by Mike Ashley.

== Reception ==
In its review of The Moon Pool, the New York Times called the novel "a shimmering, glittering web of imagination" and that "the author's energy and fertility of imaginative resources never seem to lessen."

Analog magazine considers The Moon Pool to be the author's "most celebrated novel".

== Legacy ==
The Moon Pool is sometimes cited as an influence on "The Call of Cthulhu" by H.P. Lovecraft, which may in turn have itself influenced Merritt's later story Dwellers in the Mirage (especially the monster Khalk'ru). In particular, The Moon Pool is partly set on Nan Madol, a location which would, some claim, later inspire Lovecraft's R'lyeh.

Doug Skinner has highlighted Merritt's work, starting with The Moon Pool, as a major influence on the American writer and artist Richard Shaver:

Shaver’s main literary model was Abraham Merritt. Merritt isn’t read much today, but his fantasy novels were quite popular throughout the ’20s and ’30s. Beginning with The Moon Pool in 1919, he produced a series of novels about caverns, lost races, ancient ray machines, shell-shaped hovercraft, and other marvels. ... Shaver thought Merritt had seen the caves but could only mention them in fiction. One might also suspect that Merritt’s novels had influenced Shaver’s beliefs.

== Copyright ==
The copyright for this story has expired in the United States and, thus, now resides in the public domain there. The text is available via Project Gutenberg.

== See also ==
- Dweller of the Threshold
