= Dwellers in the Mirage =

1932 novel by A. Merritt

- Dust-jacket from the first edition
- Author: A. Merritt
- Language: English
- Genre: Fantasy
- Publisher: Horace Liveright
- Publication date: 1932
- Publication place: United States
- Media type: Print (Hardback)
- Pages: 295
- OCLC: 1929358

Dwellers in the Mirage is a fantasy novel by American writer A. Merritt. It was first published in book form in 1932 by Horace Liveright. The novel was originally serialized in six parts in the magazine Argosy beginning with the January 23, 1932 issue.

== Plot introduction ==
The novel concerns American Leif Langdon who discovers a warm valley in Alaska. Two races inhabit the valley, the Little People and a branch of an ancient Mongolian race; they worship the evil Kraken named Khalk'ru which they summon from another dimension to offer human sacrifice. The inhabitants recognize Langdon as the reincarnation of their long dead hero, Dwayanu. Dwayanu's spirit possesses Langdon and starts a war with the Little People. Langdon eventually fights off the presence of Dwayanu and destroys the Kraken.

There are variant endings of the work. In the original, Leif's love dies, but the publisher inartistically has her survive. The original tragic ending has been reinstated in some recent reprints.

== Reception ==
Anthony Boucher and J. Francis McComas described Dwellers in the Mirage as attractive to "those who love wild adventure even when shallowly written."

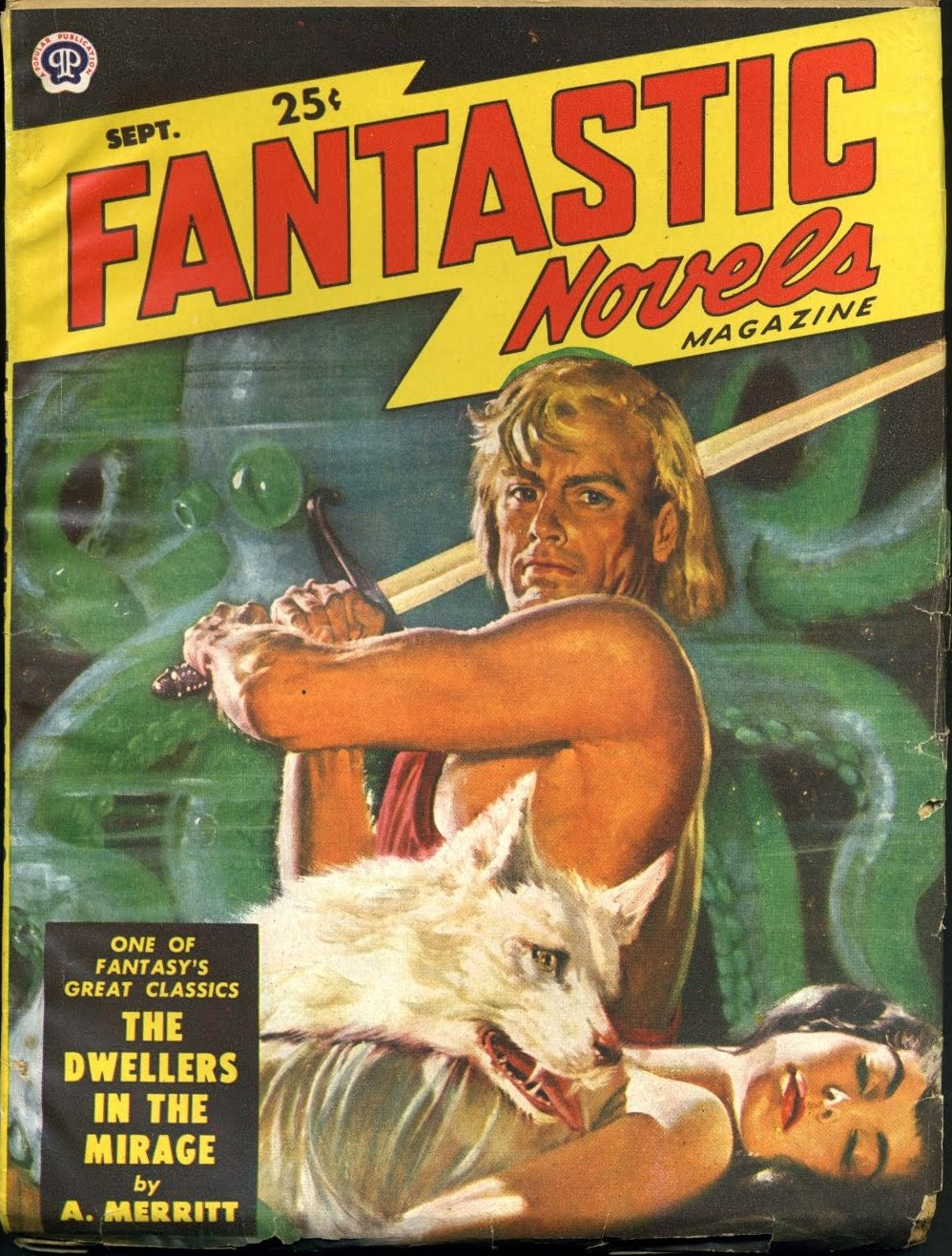
Fantastic Novels published Dwellers in the Mirage in April 1941 and reprinted it in September 1949.

== Sources ==
- Chalker, Jack L.; Mark Owings (1998). The Science-Fantasy Publishers: A Bibliographic History, 1923-1998. Westminster, MD and Baltimore: Mirage Press, Ltd. p. 316.
- Crawford, Jr., Joseph H.; James J. Donahue; Donald M. Grant (1953). "333", A Bibliography of the Science-Fantasy Novel. Providence, RI: The Grandon Company. p. 45. OCLC 3924496.
- Tuck, Donald H. (1978). The Encyclopedia of Science Fiction and Fantasy. Chicago: Advent. p. 309. ISBN 0-911682-22-8.
