= The Metal Monster =

1941 novel by Abraham Merritt

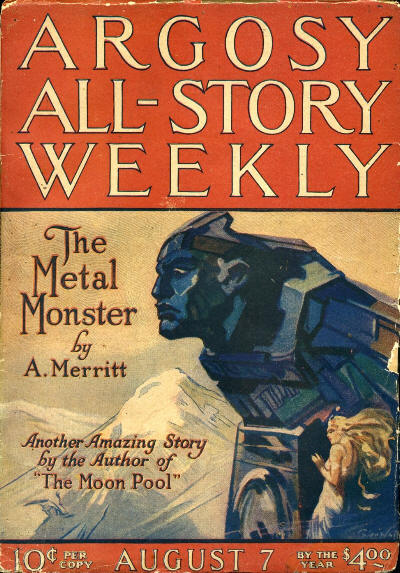
- Argosy All-Story Weekly cover featuring The Metal Monster (August 7, 1920)
- Author: Abraham Merritt
- Language: English
- Series: Weekly: August 7 - September 25, 1920
- Genre: Fantasy
- Publisher: Argosy All-Story Weekly; Avon
- Publication date: 1941
- Publication place: United States
- Media type: Print (Serial, Hardback, and Paperback)
- Pages: 222
- OCLC: 11120996
- Preceded by: The Moon Pool

The Metal Monster is a fantasy novel by American writer Abraham Merritt. It was first serialized in Argosy All-Story Weekly in 1920 and features the return of Dr. Goodwin who first appeared in The Moon Pool.

The epic adventure starts with a foreword where Merritt is assigned the duty to relay Dr. Walter T. Goodwin's incredible tale of his encounter in the Trans-Himalayan mountains to the world, to let everyone know the terrible fate Goodwin's group barely escaped and the possibility of other such monsters out there.

== Plot summary ==
Dr. Goodwin is on a botanical expedition in the Himalayas. There he meets Dick Drake, the son of one of his old science acquaintances. They are witnesses of a strange aurora-like effect, but seemingly a deliberate one. As they go out to investigate, they meet Goodwin's old friends Martin and Ruth Ventnor, brother and sister scientists. The two are besieged by Persians as Darius III led when Alexander of Macedon conquered them more than two thousand years ago.

The group is saved by a woman named Norhala. She commands the power of lightning and controls strange metal animate Things, living, metallic, geometric forms; an entire city of sentient cubes, globes and tetrahedrons, capable of joining together and forming colossal shapes, and wielding death rays and other armaments of destruction.

They are led to a hidden valley occupied by what they name "The Metal Monster", a strange metal city occupied by the metal animate Things Norhala commands. This city is governed by what they call the Metal Emperor, assisted by the Keeper of the Cones.

Ruth is slowly being converted by Norhala to become like her; her little sister. Martin, her brother, tries shooting the Metal Emperor, who retaliates with a ray blast, putting Martin in a comatose state.

Closed in between the Metal Monster and the Persians, it falls to Goodwin and Drake to find a way to escape their predicament.

== Publication history ==
- 1941, US, Avon, OCLC 11120996, Pub date 1941, Paperback, Murder Mystery Monthly No. 41
- 1974, US, Hyperion Press, OCLC 754397, Pub date 1974, Classics of Science Fiction series, reprint of 1946 Avon edition, with introduction by Sam Moskowitz
- 2002, US, Hippocampus Press, OCLC 51580003, Pub date 2002, in the Lovecraft's Library series, introduction by Stefan Dziemianowicz

== Reception ==
This book was a favorite of H. P. Lovecraft, though he at first avoided the revised version, at the suggestion of C. M. Eddy, Jr. According to his March 6, 1934 letter to James F. Morton:

Other recent items on my calendar are ... A. Merritt's old yarn The Metal Monster, which I had never read before because Eddy told me it was dull. The damn'd fool! (nephew — not our late bibliophilick friend) Actually, the book contains the most remarkable presentation of the utterly alien and non-human that I have ever seen. I don't wonder that Merritt calls it his "best and worst" production. The human characters are commonplace and wooden – just pulp hokum – but the scenes and phaenomena... oh, boy!

== Copyright ==
The copyright for this story has expired in the United States and, thus, now resides in the public domain there. The text is available via Project Gutenberg.

== Revisions ==
Three versions of the story exist.

The second version is named "The Metal Emperor", appearing in 1927 in Hugo Gernsback's Science and Invention magazine. It is an abridged version of the first story, with the leading character's name changed to Louis Thorton.
