= The Heads of Cerberus =

1919 novel by Gertrude Barrows Bennett

- Dust-jacket from the first edition
- Author: Francis Stevens
- Cover artist: Ric Binkley
- Language: English
- Genre: Science fiction
- Publisher: Polaris Press
- Publication date: 1919 serialization, 1952 book
- Publication place: United States
- Media type: Print (Hardback)
- Pages: 191
- OCLC: 3102548

The Heads of Cerberus is a science fiction novel by American writer Francis Stevens. The novel was originally serialized in the pulp magazine The Thrill Book in 1919, and it was first published in book form in 1952 by Polaris Press in an edition of 1,563 copies. It was the first book published by Polaris Press. A scholarly reprint edition was issued by Arno Press in 1978, and a mass market paperback by Carroll & Graf in 1984.

== Plot introduction ==
The novel concerns people who, after inhaling a grey dust, are transported to a future totalitarian Philadelphia in 2118.

== Reception ==
Groff Conklin called it "perhaps the first science fantasy to use the alternate time-track, or parallel worlds, idea." Boucher and McComas praised the novel as "a slightly dated but still originally imaginative and acutely satiric story." P. Schuyler Miller found Cerberus "dated and old-fashioned", but noted it was "a pioneering variation on the parallel worlds theme."

Everett F. Bleiler described the novel as "highly imaginative work, one of the classics of early pulp fantastic fiction", commenting that despite simplistic characterization, "the cynical anti-authoritarianism" in the description of the imagined future culture "is refreshing." Bleiler also noted that the novel's resolution "is a fine anticipation of the work of Philip K. Dick." Damon Knight wrote "Those who insist on the close reasoning and the satirical wit of modern science fiction will find surprising amounts of both here."

== Sources ==
- Chalker, Jack L.; Mark Owings (1998). The Science-Fantasy Publishers: A Bibliographic History, 1923-1998. Westminster, MD and Baltimore: Mirage Press, Ltd. p. 524.
- Clute, John; Peter Nicholls (1995). The Encyclopedia of Science Fiction. New York: St. Martin's Griffin. pp. 1164–1165. ISBN 0-312-13486-X.
- Tuck, Donald H. (1974). The Encyclopedia of Science Fiction and Fantasy. Chicago: Advent. p. 38. ISBN 0-911682-20-1.
