= Beyond the Golden Stair =

1970 novel by Hannes Bok

- Cover of first edition
- Author: Hannes Bok
- Original title: The Blue Flamingo
- Cover artist: Gervasio Gallardo
- Language: English
- Series: Ballantine Adult Fantasy series
- Genre: Fantasy
- Publisher: Ballantine Books
- Publication date: 1970
- Publication place: United States
- Media type: Print (paperback)
- Pages: xi, 209
- ISBN: 0-345-02093-6

Beyond the Golden Stair is a fantasy novel written by American writer Hannes Bok. It was first published as the short story "The Blue Flamingo" in the January 1948 issue of the magazine Startling Stories; later the story was extensively revised and expanded by the author into novel form. The novel version was first published in book form (posthumously) in paperback by Ballantine Books as the twenty-third volume of the Ballantine Adult Fantasy series in November, 1970. The Ballantine edition includes an introduction by American author Lin Carter.

== Plot summary ==
Hibbert, an imprisoned innocent, is caught up in the jailbreak of his cellmate Scarlatti, engineered with the assistance of another man, Burks. Forcing Hibbert to accompany them, Scarlatti and Burks make for the Florida Everglades, picking up Scarlatti's girlfriend Carlotta on the way.

In the Everglades the four encounter a miraculous golden stairway extending into the sky. Ascending, they find a pool defended by a blue flamingo, which is killed by Burks. Another stairway leads them to the land of Khoire, a strange and mysterious paradise. There a man named Patur exposes the true nature of each by means of a crystal mask. He warns them that they will be transformed in accordance with those natures within a day, and must leave Khoire.

Scarlatti and Carlotta's alteration is horrible, and they are consumed by a huge beast; Burks agrees to become a blue flamingo, taking the place of the guardian of the pool, in the hope of some day being readmitted to Khoire. Hibbert is little changed. Returning to the mundane world, he undertakes to find certain persons who can help him gain his own readmittance to Khoire, having fallen in love with one of its denizens, Mareth of the Watchers.
