= Hannes Bok =

American artist (1914–1964)

- Born: Wayne Francis Woodard; July 2, 1914; Kansas City, Missouri, United States
- Died: April 11, 1964 (aged 49); New York City, New York, United States
- Occupations: Illustrator, writer
- Writing career
- Pen name: Hannes Bok
- Period: 1939–1957 (SF magazine artist)
- Genre: Fantasy

Wayne Francis Woodard (/ˈwʊdərd/ WUUD-ərd; July 2, 1914 – April 11, 1964), known by the pseudonym Hannes Bok (/ˌhɑːnəs ˈbɒk/ HAH-nəs BOK), was an American artist and illustrator, as well as an amateur astrologer and writer of fantasy fiction and poetry. He painted nearly 150 covers for various science fiction, fantasy, and detective fiction magazines, as well as contributing hundreds of black and white interior illustrations. Bok's work appeared in calendars and early fanzines, as well as dust jackets from specialty book publishers like Arkham House, Llewellyn, Shasta Publishers, and Fantasy Press. His paintings achieved a luminous quality through the use of an arduous glazing process, which was learned from his mentor, Maxfield Parrish. Bok shared one of the inaugural 1953 Hugo Awards for science fiction achievement (Best Cover Artist).

== Life and career ==
Wayne Woodard (the name is sometimes mistakenly rendered as "Woodward") was born in Kansas City, Missouri. His parents divorced when he was five; and his father and stepmother, strict disciplinarians, discouraged his artistic efforts. Once he graduated high school, in Duluth, Minnesota, Bok cut off contact with his father and moved to Seattle to live with his mother. There he became active in SF fandom, including the publication and illustration of fanzines. It was in connection with these activities that he originated his pseudonym, first "Hans", then "Hannes", Bok. The pseudonym derives from Johann Sebastian Bach (whose name can be rendered both as "Johann S. Bach" and "Johannes Bach").

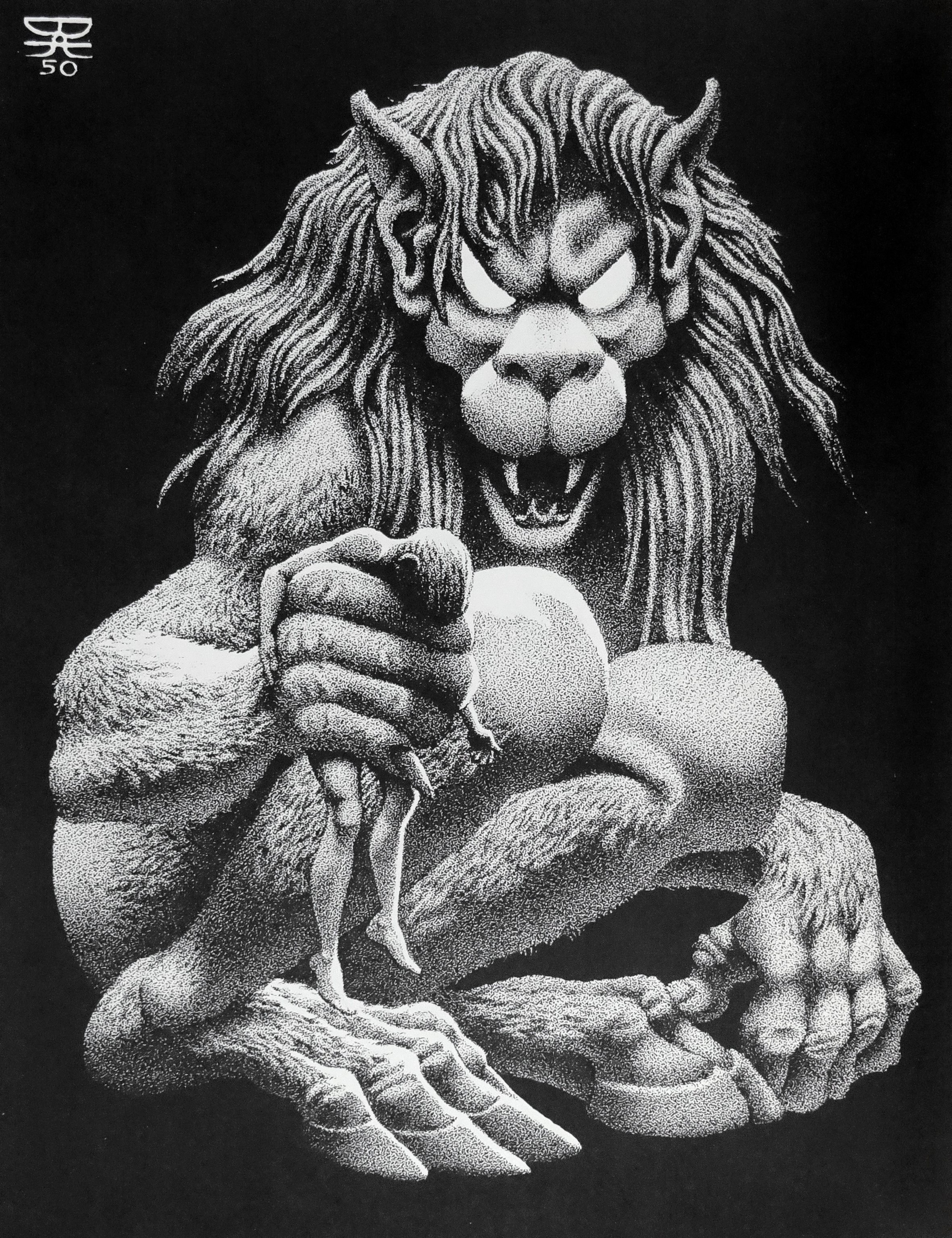
Hannes Bok's illustration for the printing of "Pickman's Model" in the December 1951 issue of Famous Fantastic Mysteries

In 1937, Bok moved to Los Angeles, where he met Ray Bradbury. In 1938, he relocated to Seattle – where he worked for the W.P.A. and became acquainted with artists like Mark Tobey and Morris Graves. Late in 1939, Bok moved to New York City in order to be closer to the editors and magazines which would publish his work, and where he became a member of the influential Futurians science fiction fans. Bok had corresponded with and had met Maxfield Parrish (ca. 1939?), and the influence of Parrish's art on Bok's is evident in his choice of subject matter, use of color, and application of glazes.

Bok was gay, according to his friends Forrest J Ackerman and Emil Petaja. The erotic fantasy elements of his artwork, especially his male nude subjects, display homoerotic overtones unusual for the time. The opening chapters of his novel Beyond the Golden Stair hint at a sexual relationship between two prison inmates, the hero John Hibbert and the gangster Frank Scarlatti.

Like his contemporary Virgil Finlay, Hannes Bok broke into commercial art and achieved initial career success as a Weird Tales artist – though he did so through one of the stranger events in the history of science fiction and fantasy. In the summer of 1939, Ray Bradbury carried samples of Bok's art eastward to introduce his friend's work to magazine editors at the first World Science Fiction Convention. This was a bold move, since Bradbury was a neophyte with no connections to commercial art or the magazine industry; but it reflects the close ties within the fan and professional community. Bradbury was, at the time, a 19-year-old newspaper seller, and he borrowed funds for the trip from fellow science fiction fan Forrest J Ackerman. Bradbury succeeded; Farnsworth Wright, editor of Weird Tales, accepted Bok's art, which debuted in the December 1939 issue of Weird Tales. More than 50 issues of the magazine featured Bok's pen-and-ink work until March 1954. Bok also executed six color covers for Weird Tales between March 1940 and March 1942. Weird Tales also published five of Bok's stories and two of his poems between 1942 and 1951. Once he broke through into professional publications, Bok moved to New York City and lived there the rest of his life.

Throughout his life, Bok was deeply interested in astrology, as well as in the music of the Finnish composer Jean Sibelius, with whom Bok had a correspondence. (Bok's copy of Karl Ekman's Jean Sibelius: His Life and Personality [Knopf, 1938], for example, is annotated with Bok's comments and astrological charts.) As the years passed, Bok became prone to disagreements with editors over money and artistic issues; he grew reclusive and mystical, and preoccupied with the occult. He eked out a living, often in near poverty, until his death in 1964. He died, apparently of a heart attack (he "starved to death" according to Ackerman), at the age of 49. ISFDB catalogs only a few 1956 interior illustrations after March 1954, his last for Weird Tales, and only two cover illustrations after January 1957.

== Awards ==
- Hugo Award for Best Cover Artist, 1953

== Novels and novellas ==
- A Hannes Bok Treasury, edited and an introduction by Stephen Korshak, Foreword By Ray Bradbury (Underwood-Miler), 1993
- Starstone World (novella), Science Fiction Quarterly, Summer 1942; reprinted in The Fantastic Fiction of Hannes Bok, American Fantasy Press, 2020.
- The Sorcerer's Ship, complete novel in the magazine Unknown, December 1942; reprinted as a Ballantine Adult Fantasy series paperback, 1969; reprinted in The Fantastic Fiction of Hannes Bok, American Fantasy Press, 2020.
- The Fox Woman and The Blue Pagoda (posthumous completion of the novel The Fox Woman by A. Merritt; also illustrated by Bok), New Collectors Group, 1946.
- The Black Wheel (posthumous completion of a novel by (A. Merritt; also illustrated by Bok), New Collectors Group, 1947.
- Beyond the Golden Stair (longer version of the novella The Blue Flamingo in the magazine Startling Stories, January 1948), Ballantine Adult Fantasy series paperback, 1969; reprinted in The Fantastic Fiction of Hannes Bok, American Fantasy Press, 2020.
