= A. Merritt's Fantasy Magazine =

US pulp science fiction and fantasy magazine

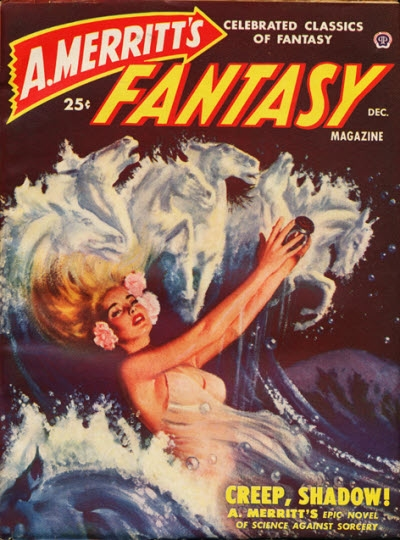
The December 1949 issue of A. Merritt's Fantasy Magazine; cover art by Peter Stevens.

A. Merritt's Fantasy Magazine was an American pulp magazine which published five issues from December 1949 to October 1950. It took its name from fantasy writer A. Merritt, who had died in 1943, and it aimed to capitalize on Merritt's popularity. It was published by Popular Publications, alternating months with Fantastic Novels, another title of theirs. It may have been edited by Mary Gnaedinger, who also edited Fantastic Novels and Famous Fantastic Mysteries. It was a companion to Famous Fantastic Mysteries, and like that magazine mostly reprinted science-fiction and fantasy classics from earlier decades.

== Publication history and contents ==
	Jan	Feb	Mar	Apr	May	Jun	Jul	Aug	Sep	Oct	Nov	Dec
1949												1/1
1950		1/2		1/3			1/4			2/1		
Issues of A. Merritt's Fantasy Magazine from 1949 to 1950, showing volume and issue numbers. The editor was not identified but may have been Mary Gnaedinger.

In 1942, Popular Publications acquired Famous Fantastic Mysteries and Fantastic Novels, both of them pulp magazines specializing in reprints of fantasy, from the Munsey Company. Fantastic Novels had ceased publication in April 1941, but was relaunched by Popular in early 1948 as a companion to Famous Fantastic Mysteries, which was still being published. The following year Popular decided to add another fantasy reprint magazine to their line-up: the title they chose was A. Merritt's Fantasy Magazine, and the first issue was dated December 1949. Abraham Merritt (usually known as A. Merritt), after whom the magazine was named, was one of the most popular fantasy authors of the pulp era: the magazine was intended to take advantage of his popularity, but only five issues appeared, over a period of just under a year, before the magazine was closed down.

In addition to Merritt's novel Creep, Shadow!, which appeared in the first issue, the magazine printed several well-received stories. These included "The Smoking Land", a novel by Frederick Faust, under the pseudonym George Challis, and a detective novel by Jack Mann, The Ninth Life. A letter to the magazine from a young Robert Silverberg appeared in one of the letter columns.

Different theories have been offered as to why the magazine failed. Editor and science fiction historian Malcolm Edwards suggests that Merritt's death six years earlier, in 1943, made the magazine a risky proposition, despite Merritt's continuing popularity in the late 1940s. Science fiction historian and critic Sam Moskowitz suggests that, conversely, the magazine did not go far enough in depending on Merritt's popularity, as it only printed three works of his during its run. This may have been because Merritt was sufficiently popular that it was not easy for the magazine to obtain reprint rights to his stories.

== Bibliographic details ==
The editor was not announced in the magazine. Mary Gnaedinger was the editor for the two companion magazines, Famous Fantastic Mysteries and Fantastic Novels, but Sam Moskowitz has suggested that it was unlikely Gnaedinger was the editor for A. Merritt's Fantasy Magazine. The magazine remained in pulp format throughout its short run. It was 132 pages and priced at 25 cents for all five issues. A Canadian edition of all five issues appeared; these were identical to the originals in every way except for the back cover advertisement and the format—the Canadian issues were half an inch longer.

The publisher was based in Kokomo, Indiana; the editorial offices were in New York.

== Sources ==
- Clareson, Thomas D. (1985a). "Famous Fantastic Mysteries". In Tymn, Marshall B.; Ashley, Mike (eds.). Science Fiction, Fantasy, and Weird Fiction Magazines. Westport CT: Greenwood Press. pp. 211–216. ISBN 0-313-21221-X.
- Clareson, Thomas D. (1985b). "Fantastic Novels". In Tymn, Marshall B.; Ashley, Mike (eds.). Science Fiction, Fantasy, and Weird Fiction Magazines. Westport CT: Greenwood Press. pp. 241–244. ISBN 0-313-21221-X.
- Sanders, Joe (1985). "A. Merritt's Fantasy Magazine". In Tymn, Marshall B.; Ashley, Mike (eds.). Science Fiction, Fantasy, and Weird Fiction Magazines. Westport CT: Greenwood Press. pp. 3–6. ISBN 0-313-21221-X.
- Stableford, Brian (1993). "Merritt, A.". In Clute, John; Nicholls, Peter (eds.). The Encyclopedia of Science Fiction. New York: St. Martin's Press, Inc. pp. 639–640. ISBN 0-312-09618-6.
