= George Allan England =

American writer and explorer (1877–1936)

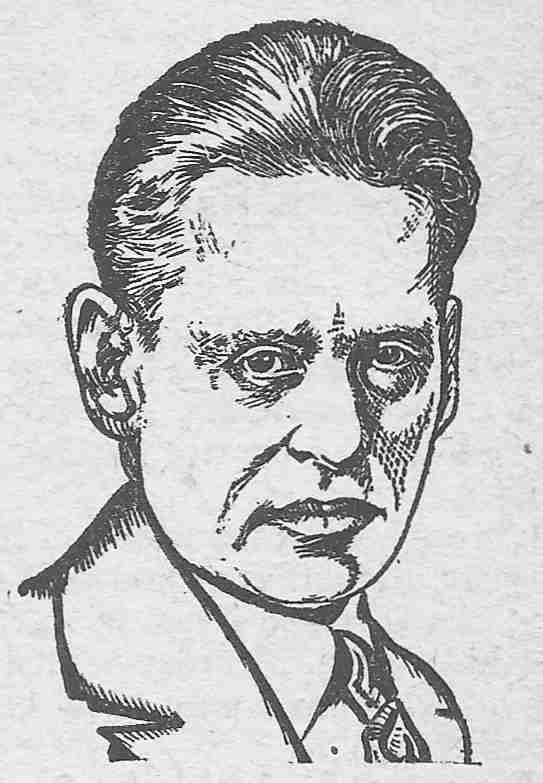
- England as depicted in Wonder Stories, January 1930
- Born: February 9, 1877; Fort McPherson, Nebraska, United States
- Died: June 26, 1936 (aged 59); Concord, New Hampshire, United States
- Occupations: Writer, explorer
- Spouse: Blanche Porter
- Writing career
- Language: English
- Genres: Speculative fiction, science fiction

George Allan England (February 9, 1877 - June 26, 1936) was an American writer and explorer, best known for his speculative and science fiction. He attended Harvard University and later in life unsuccessfully ran for Governor of Maine.

== Life ==
England was born in Nebraska. He attended Harvard University, where he received Bachelor of Arts (A.B.) and Master of Arts (M.A.) degrees. In 1912 he stood for Governor of Maine as the candidate of the Socialist Party of America. In that election, he finished in third place with 2,081 votes (1.47%). England died in a hospital in New Hampshire, although there is a legend that he disappeared on a treasure hunt.

== Science fiction ==
England's writing career took place mainly in New York and Maine. Many of his works have a socialist theme. Influences on England's writing include H. G. Wells, Jack London and Algernon Blackwood.

England's trilogy, Darkness and Dawn (published in 1912, 1913 and 1914 as The Vacant World, Beyond the Great Oblivion and Afterglow), is perhaps his most successful work. The books tell the story of two modern humans who awake a thousand years after the Earth was devastated by a meteor who then work to rebuild civilization.

England's novel The Air Trust (1915) is the story of a billionaire, Isaac Flint, who attempts to control the very air people breathe, and the violent consequences of his ambition and greed. In the concluding chapter, Flint is described as one of "the most sinister and cruel minds ever evolved upon this planet."

England's short story, "The Thing from—'Outside'", which had originally appeared in Hugo Gernsback's magazine Science and Invention, was reprinted in the first issue of the first science fiction magazine, Amazing Stories, in April 1926.

== Other works ==
In addition to his science fiction works, England also occasionally wrote about remote or little-known places for The Saturday Evening Post. For instance, he wrote several articles documenting the seal hunt in Newfoundland, which were eventually compiled into Vikings of the Ice (1924). Similarly, in Isle of Romance (1929), England recorded his travels to the various remote islands across the Caribbean and eastern North America, including St. Pierre and Miquelon, Sable Island, and Grand Cayman.

== Novels ==
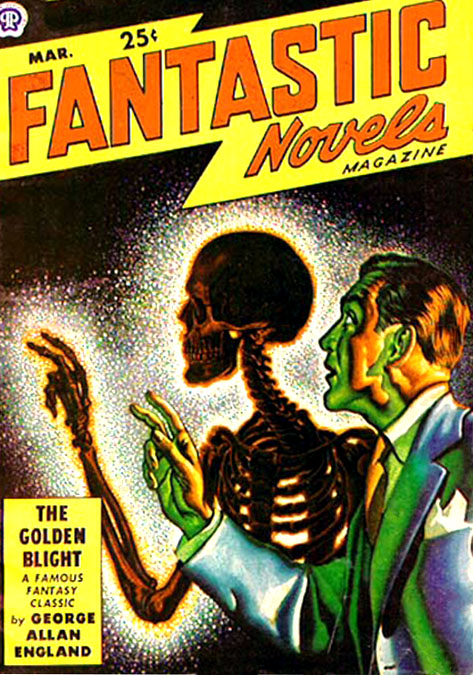
The Golden Blight was republished in the March 1949 issue of Fantastic Novels.

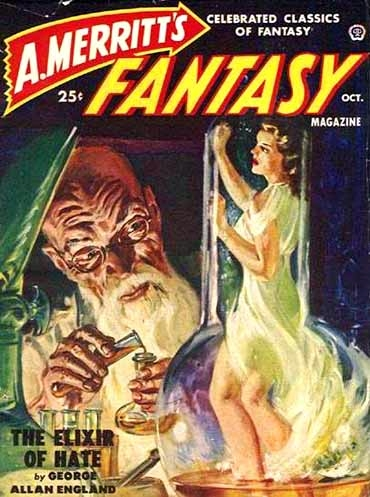
The Elixir of Hate was reprinted in the October 1950 issue of A. Merritt's Fantasy Magazine

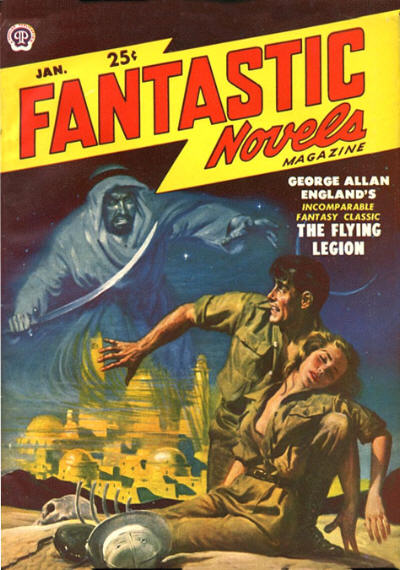
The Flying Legion was republished in the January 1950 issue of Fantastic Novels.

- Darkness and Dawn Series
  - The Vacant World (1912)
  - Beyond the Great Oblivion (1913)
  - The Afterglow (1914)

Other Novels

- Beyond White Seas (1910)
- The Elixir of Hate (1910)
- The Empire in the Air (1914)
- The Air Trust (1915)
- The Fatal Gift (1915)
- The Golden Blight (1916)
- The Gift Supreme (1916)
- Bill Jenkins, Buccaneer (1917)
- Cursed (1919)
- The Flying Legion (1920)
- Adventure Isle (1926)

== Short stories ==
- Pod, Bender and Co (October 1916) - Short story collection
  - When Pod Took the Count
  - A Flyer in Annuities
  - Birds of Passage
  - "Ammunition — With Care"
  - Art for Art's Sake
  - The Old Homestead
  - Pod Flits
  - A Game of Solitaire
  - Crayons and Clay
  - The Turning of the Worm
  - Lobsters and Loot
  - The Supreme Getaway
  - Knight Errants Up-to-Date
  - The Kimberley Special
  - A Passage at Arms
  - Fly-Time
- The Thing--From Outside (2016, short story collection)

Title	Publication Date	First Published In	Notes
The Americano at Cerdos	June 1905	Leslie's Monthly Magazine	
The Time Reflector	September 1905	The Monthly Story Magazine	
At the Eleventh Hour	Dectemer 1905	The All-Story Magazine	
Neevus and the Wolf Pack	February 1906	The American Boy	
The Turning of the Worm	February 1906	The All-Story Magazine	Pittsburg Bender; Pod Slattery
The Cylinder	June 1906	The All-Story Magazine	
Family Jars: A Little Tale of Cousinly Amenities	June 1906	The American Magazine	
Fire Fight Fire	July 1906	Munsey's	
Vengeance Is Mine	July 1906	The All-Story Magazine	
The Garden of Graft	August 1906	The All-Story Magazine	
The Lunar Advertising Co., Ltd.	August 1906	The Gray Goose	
Birds of Passage	November 1906	The All-Story Magazine	Pittsburg Bender; Pod Slattery
The Sorrows of Giuseppe	December 1906	McClure's	
Jonas	January 1907	Munsey's	
A Game of Solitaire	March 1907	The All-Story Magazine	Pittsburg Bender; Pod Slattery
Burdocks and Blueberries	April 1907	The All-Story Magazine	
Thad's Watchers	September 1907	McClure's	
The Heart of Love	November 1907	Cosmopolitan	
Ammunition-With Care	February 1908	The All-Story Magazine	Pittsburg Bender; Pod Slattery
When Pod Took the Count	March 19087	The All-Story Magazine	Pittsburg Bender; Pod Slattery
The Hand of Blood	April 1908	The Gray Goose	
Three Hearts and a Head	April 1908	Munsey's	
Midsummer Madness	July 1908	The Outing Magazine	
Art for Art's Sake	September 1908	The Gray Goose	Pittsburg Bender; Pod Slattery
The Mermaid	October 1908	The Scrap Book	Captain Leonidas Tripp
Africa	November 1908	The Cavalier	
King Sullivan	February 1909	Munsey's	
My Time-Annihilator	June 1909	The All-Story Magazine	
The Girl at Gunflint Lake	July 1909	Munsey's	
Pod Flits	August 1909	The All-Story Magazine	Pittsburg Bender; Pod Slattery
A Question of Salvage	September 1909	McClure's	
Below the Cliff	November 1909	Gunter's Magazine	
On Shark's Fin Reef	January 1910	Munsey's	
Day of Days	July 1910	The Red Book Magazine	
The Million-Lira Ticket	September 1910	The Scrap Book	
Failures	October 1910	The All-Story Magazine	
The Old Homestead	October 1910	The Scrap Book	Pittsburg Bender; Pod Slattery
Personally Conducted	December 1910	Adventure	
At the Semaphore	February 1911	The Railroad Man's Magazine	
He of the Glass Heart	May 1911	The Scrap Book	
The Chechacko	April 1912	Adventure	
Bill January	May 1912	The Hampton Magazine	
The Million-Dollar Patch	June 1912	The All-Story	
The Shackles of Fate	October 1912	The Red Book Magazine	
A Passage at Arms	March 29, 1913	The Cavalier	Pittsburg Bender; Pod Slattery
Oil and Water	March 1913	Munsey's	
Pod Slattery's Peril	April 26, 1913	The Cavalier	Pod Slattery
The Sprucer	May 1913	Munsey's	
The Kimberly Special	June 7, 1913	The Cavalier	Pittsburg Bender; Pod Slattery
The Toss-Up	July 4, 1913	Harper's Weekly	
Fly-Time	July 12, 1913	The Cavalier	Pittsburg Bender; Pod Slattery
Thomas Mittens, Stockholder	July 1913	The Red Book Magazine	
The Supreme Getaway	August 23, 1913	The Cavalier	Pittsburg Bender; Pod Slattery
Other Days	October 1913	The Red Book Magazine	
Speedy Limit	November 15, 1913	The Cavalier	
The Lie	December 6, 1913	The Cavalier	
Out of the Real	January 1914	Munsey's	
In Mariners' House	February 7, 1914	The Cavalier	
At Allaguash	April 1914	People's Ideal Fiction Magazine	
Meeting Matchett	April 1914	The Red Book Magazine	
Trousers and Tragedy	July 1914	Munsey's	
Barbed Wire and Buttermilk	September 26, 1914	All-Story Cavalier Weekly	
Legs and the Man	November 1914	The Blue Book Magazine	
The Trap	November 1914	Lippincott's Magazine	
Even in Death	December 12, 1914	All-Story Cavalier Weekly	
The Spy	June 1915	Pearson's Magazine (USA)	
Love!	August 1915	The Red Book Magazine	
The Tenth Question	December 18, 1915	All-Story Weekly	
The Plunge	April 1, 1916	Snappy Stories	
Summer	June 1916	The Red Book Magazine	
The Princess Kukupa	July 1916	All Around Magazine	
A Flyer in Annuities	October 1916	Pod, Beneder and Co	
A Game of Solitaire	October 1916	Pod, Beneder and Co	
Crayons and Clay	October 1916	Pod, Beneder and Co	
The Turning of the Worm	October 1916	Pod, Beneder and Co	
Lobsters and Loot	October 1916	Pod, Beneder and Co	
Knight Errants Up-to-Date	October 1916	Pod, Beneder and Co	
Bill Jenkins, Buccaneer	February–March 1917	All-Story Weekly	
The Lotus-Eater	April 2, 1917	Snappy Stories	
Relics	May 1, 1917	Snappy Stories	
Fifteen Minutes	June 1, 1917	Snappy Stories	
Odyssey Jr.	August 4, 1917	All-Story Weekly	
The Mysterious Millionaire	September 1, 1917	All-Story Weekly	
Autumn	September 1917	The Red Book Magazine	
The Clutch of Tantalus	October 10, 1917	People's Favorite Magazine	
The Scapegrace	October 25, 1917	People's Favorite Magazine	
The Affair in Room 99	November 25, 1917	People's Favorite Magazine	
Journey's End	September 1918	The Parisienne Monthly Magazine	
On the Rack of Fear	November 10, 1918	People's Favorite Magazine	
Phonies All	November 1918	Breezy Stories	
On Grand Cayman	January 1919	Munsey's	
Swamis Twain	January 1919	The Blue Book Magazine	
Armageddon Valley	February 1919	The Blue Book Magazine	Pittsburgh Bender; Pod Slattery
Shall - or Shall Not	April 5, 1919	All-Story Weekly	
Bennington's Bath	July 1919	The Blue Book Magazine	Bennington
A Man	August 1919	Telling Tales	
Bennington's Lemons	April 1920	The Blue Book Magazine	Bennington
Two Ways	September 1920	Breezy Stories	
Bennington's Bus	November 1920	The Blue Book Magazine	Bennington
Bennington's Boom	January 1921	The Blue Book Magazine	Bennington
Fifty-Fifty	March 19, 1921	The Saturday Evening Post	
Recreants Twain	March 1921	The Blue Book Magazine	Pittsburgh Bender; Pod Slattery
Test Tubes	March 1921	Short Stories	
Powers of Darkness	May 1921	People's Favorite Magazine	
Webster Said Something	May 1921	The Blue Book Magazine	Bennington
The Girl Across The Way	June 1921	McCall's Magazine	
As Ye Plant—	August 10, 1921	Short Stories	
Paid in Advance	October 1921	Munsey's	
The Longest Side	November 10, 1921	People's Favorite Magazine	-
Bennington's Bandit	December 1921	The Blue Book Magazine	Bennington
Drops of Death	January 1922	Munsey's	
One Pebble	February 25, 1922	People's Story Magazine	
Bennington's Boy	February 1922	The Blue Book Magazine	Bennington
Sauce	March 1922	Everybody's Magazine	
Twists	April 10, 1922	People's Story Magazine	
Leatherbee's Luck	April 1922	The Blue Book Magazine	
A Polite Question	April 1922	Munsey's	
Luck	May 10, 1922	People's Story Magazine	
Friendship	June 10, 1922	People's Story Magazine	
Bennington, Brute	July 1922	The Blue Book Magazine	Bennington
Fern Shadows	July 1922	Munsey's	
Fits	September 25, 1922	Short Stories	
Compacts of Life	December 1, 1922	Snappy Stories	
The Broken Arrow	Jan 12, 1922	Western Story Magazine	
Troubled Waters	March 1, 1923	People's Magazine	
Petticoats	April 1, 1923	People's Magazine	Captain Leonidas Tripp
The Nogg-Head	July 21, 1923	The Saturday Evening Post	
Rats	October 1, 1923	People's Magazine	
Foam	January 1, 1924	People's Magazine	
Rust	January 15, 1924	People's Magazine	
Honor	May 15, 1924	People's Magazine	
Chance	August 1, 1924	People's Magazine	Captain Leonidas Tripp
Strong Men and Meat	August 10, 1924	Short Stories	
Dice of Destiny	September 10, 1924	Short Stories	
Feathers	September 24, 1924	Complete Story Magazine	
Ch'eng and Foo	October 25, 1924	Complete Story Magazine	
Bennington's Bio-Beauty	October 1924	The Blue Book Magazine	Bennington
Roving	February 25, 1925	Complete Story Magazine	
Half a Brick	June 6, 1925	The Saturday Evening Post	
Ice	August 10, 1925	Complete Story Magazine	
Sir Galahad of Gila	September 1925	The Blue Book Magazine	
The Ship That Strayed	October 10, 1925	Short Stories	
Verdict: "Suicide"	November 28, 1925	Argosy All-Story Weekly	
Velvet	December 1925	Munsey's	
Bennington's Birds	January 1926	The Blue Book Magazine	Bennington
Powder	February 1926	Sea Stories Magazine	Captain Leonidas Tripp
Kangaroo	March 1926	Sea Stories Magazine	Captain Leonidas Tripp
Terror	April/May 1926	Real Detective Tales and Mystery Stories	
Elephant	July 1926	Sea Stories Magazine	Captain Leonidas Tripp
Ivory	August 1926	Sea Stories Magazine	Captain Leonidas Tripp
At Plug 47	October 1926	The Blue Book Magazine	
Divorce	February 1927	Sea Stories Magazine	Captain Leonidas Tripp
Cork	March 1927	Sea Stories	
Johnny Moaner	June 1927	Everybody's Magazine	
Dorymates	January 1, 1928	Adventure	
Bananas	February 1929	The Blue Book Magazine	
Mamma Told Me	May 1930	The Blue Book Magazine	
Bennington the Buccaneer	August 1930	The Blue Book Magazine	Bennington
Stand by to Ram	September 15, 1930	Adventure	
High Explosive	March 1931	The Blue Book Magazine	
Moriarty	May 30, 1931	Liberty	
Rough Toss	May 15, 1932	The Popular Complete Stories	
Locoed	May 20, 1933	Detective Fiction Weekly	T. Ashley
Pipes of Death	Sep 16, 1933	Detective Fiction Weekly	
The Kalanga of Death	November 1933	Danger Trail	
Pieces of the Puzzle	February 3, 1934	Detective Fiction Weekly	
Nothin' Like Leather	April 10, 1934	Short Stories	
Kangaroo	1944	Sea Story Annual	
