= The Face in the Abyss =

1931 novel by A. Merritt

- Dust-jacket from the first edition
- Author: A. Merritt
- Language: English
- Series: "The Face in the Abyss"; September 8, 1923 "The Snake Mother"; Weekly: October 25-December 6, 1930
- Genre: Fantasy
- Publisher: Argosy All-Story Weekly; Argosy; Horace Liveright
- Publication date: 1931
- Publication place: United States
- Media type: Print (Serial, Hardback, and Paperback)
- Pages: 343
- OCLC: 2528594

The Face in the Abyss is a fantasy novel by American writer A. Merritt. It is composed of a novelette with the same title and its sequel, "The Snake Mother". It was first published in its complete form in 1931 by Horace Liveright. The novelette "The Face in the Abyss" originally appeared in the magazine Argosy All-Story Weekly in the September 8, 1923 issue. "The Snake Mother" was originally serialized in seven parts in Argosy beginning with the October 25, 1930 issue.

== Plot introduction ==
The novel follows Nicholas Graydon, an American mining engineer. While searching for lost Inca treasure in South America, he meets Suarra, handmaiden to the Snake Mother of Yu-Atlanchi. She guides him to an abyss where Nimir, the Lord of Evil, is imprisoned in a golden mask. Graydon's companions, consumed by greed, are transformed into gold globules by the mask. However, Suarra and the Snake Mother save him, and he joins their battle against Nimir.

== Reception ==
Peter Levi has noted parallels between The Face in the Abyss and a story H.P. Lovecraft created as a ghostwriter, "The Mound."

== Sources ==
- Chalker, Jack L.; Mark Owings (1998). The Science-Fantasy Publishers: A Bibliographic History, 1923-1998. Westminster, MD and Baltimore: Mirage Press, Ltd. p. 334.
- Crawford, Jr., Joseph H.; James J. Donahue; Donald M. Grant (1953). 333: A Bibliography of the Science-Fantasy Novel. Providence, RI: The Grandon Company. p. 45. OCLC 3924496.
- Tuck, Donald H. (1978). The Encyclopedia of Science Fiction and Fantasy. Chicago: Advent. p. 309. ISBN 0-911682-22-8.
