= The Ship of Ishtar =

Book by Abraham Grace Merritt

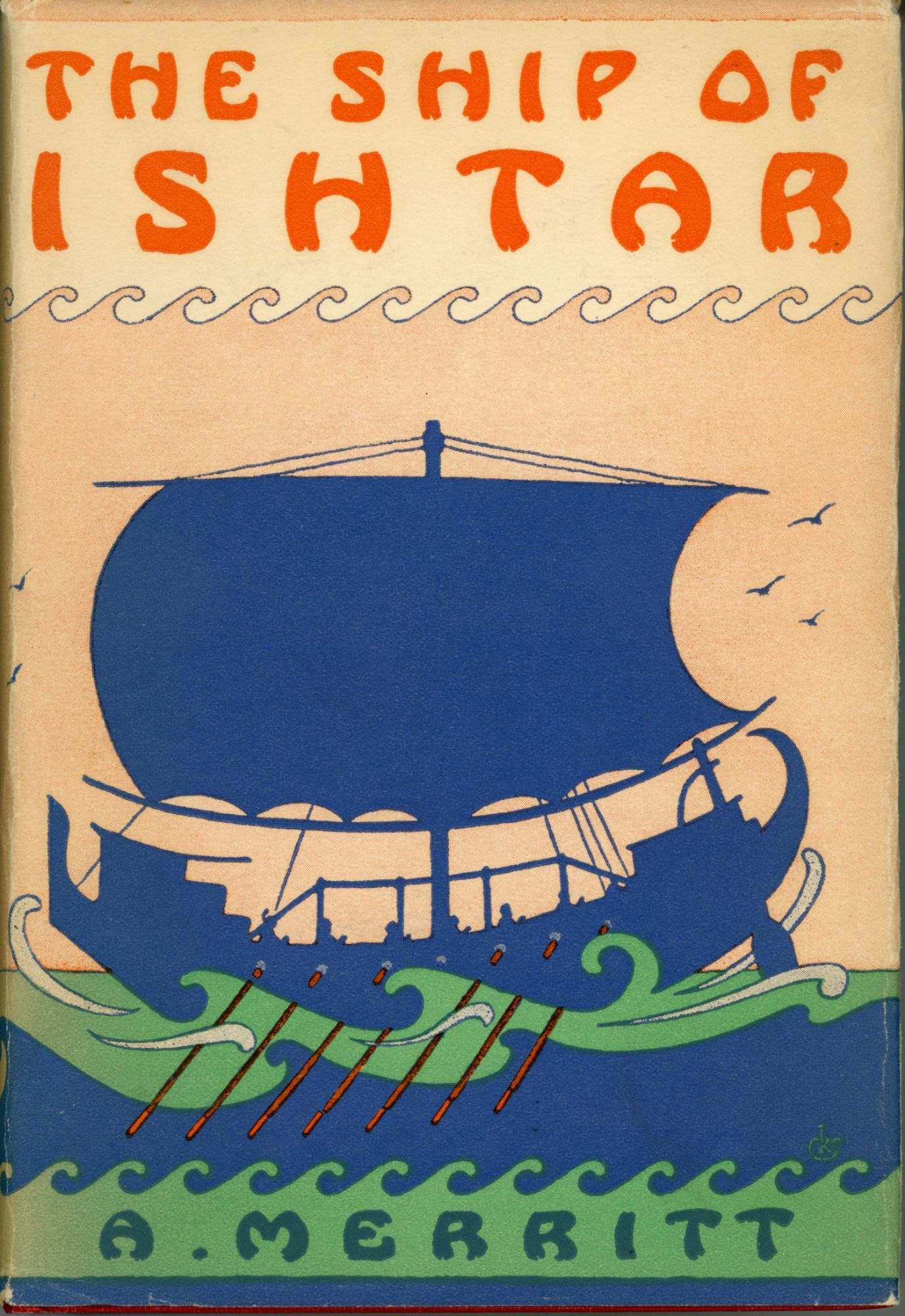
- First edition dust jacket
- Author: A. Merritt
- Language: English
- Series: Weekly: November 8 - December 13, 1924
- Genre: Fantasy
- Publisher: Argosy All-Story Weekly; Argosy; G. P. Putnam's Sons
- Publication date: 1924
- Publication place: United States
- Media type: Print (Serial, Hardback, and Paperback)
- Pages: 230
- LC Class: 26004777

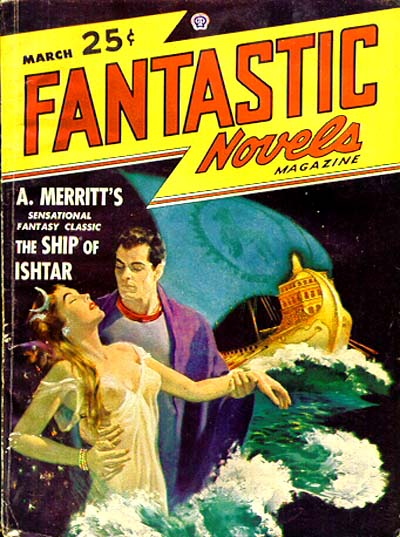
The Ship of Ishtar was reprinted in Fantastic Novels in 1948

The Ship of Ishtar is a fantasy novel by American writer A. Merritt. Originally published as a magazine serial in 1924, it has appeared in book form innumerable times. The novel depicts a modern archaeologist who has to intervene in an eternal conflict between the deities Ishtar and Nergal. In the novel, the deities have possessed the bodies of their human priests.

== Plot introduction ==
The archaeologist hero, Kenton, receives a mysterious ancient Babylonian artifact, which he discovers contains an incredibly detailed model of a ship. A dizzy spell casts Kenton onto the deck of the ship, which becomes a full-sized vessel sailing an eternal sea. At one end is Sharane the assistant priestess of Ishtar and her female minions, and at the other is Klaneth the assistant priest of Nergal and his male minions, representatives of two opposed deities. None of them can cross an invisible barrier at the midline of the ship, but Kenton can. His arrival destabilizes a situation that had been frozen for 6,000 years, and fantastic adventures ensue.

The novel is not only a rousing fantasy adventure story, but a philosophical exploration of the relationship between material reality and the abstract concepts through which humans struggle to understand it. The reason the ship has been frozen in time is that Zarpanit the head priestess of Ishtar and Alusar the head priest of Nergal fell in love, and were in the midst of making love when their deities possessed them. This placed the hostile deities in an untenable position, especially as they represented cosmic forces that must be kept separate. The result was an imbalance between stability and instability in the universe, freezing the ship in time and rendering unstable its connection to the reality inhabited by the reader. In a study of fantasy and science fiction literature, William Sims Bainbridge (1986: 136) explained:

"The author uses evocative language and intense images to convey a sense of the marvelous and mysterious. It is Kenton's fate to intervene in the frozen cosmic struggle between Ishtar and Nergal, to fall in love with Sharane, and to gain Klaneth as his mortal enemy. The book builds tension through the device of letting Kenton's tie to the ship periodically become so weak that he falls back, unwilling, to his New York home. Kenton's tenuous psychic connection to the ship represents the reader's involvement in the fantasy. At any moment the ship may fade from reality, and both Kenton and the reader will be imprisoned in the mundane world of the everyday."

== Publication history ==
- Six installments in Argosy All-Story magazine, November 8 - December 13, 1924.
- 1926, US, G. P. Putnam's Sons
- 1949, US, Borden OCLC 543508
- 1975, France, J'ai lu OCLC 77463966, French translation
- 1977, Germany, Pabel OCLC 74362695, German translation
- 1982, Japan, Hayakawa Publishing OCLC 673346651, Japanese translation
- 1991, Spain, Valdemar OCLC 433813856, Spanish translation
- 1993, Russia, Severo-zapad OCLC 31706100, Russian translation
