= Captain Zero (magazine) =

American pulp magazine

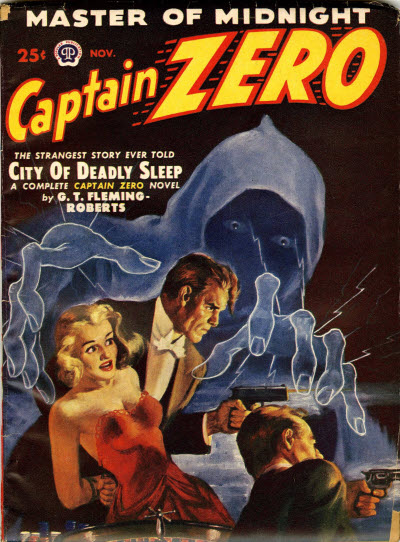
Cover of the first issue; art is by Rafael De Soto

Captain Zero was an American pulp magazine that published three issues in 1949 and 1950. The lead novels, written by G.T. Fleming-Roberts, featured Lee Allyn, who had been the subject of an experiment with radiation, and as a result was invisible between midnight and dawn. Under the name Captain Zero, Allyn became a vigilante, fighting crime at night. Allyn had no other superpowers, and the novels were straightforward mysteries in Weinberg's opinion, though pulp historian Robert Sampson considers them to be "complex...[they] pound along with hair-raising incidents..full of twists and high suspense". Captain Zero was the last crime-fighter hero magazine to be launched in the pulp era, ending an era that had begun with The Shadow in 1931. There was room in the magazine for only one or two short stories along with the lead novel; these were all straight mystery stories, without the veneer of science fiction of the Captain Zero novels.

The covers, all by Rafael De Soto, are "less satisfying" than the novels, in Sampson's opinion; Captain Zero is represented just by a floating robe and hood with glaring eyes—though the original artwork for the second issue, now in private hands, only shows the figures of a woman, and a man firing a gun, with no representation of Captain Zero. The internal artwork—in Sampson's view; "clean, bright, satisfying work, vividly done"—was by an unknown artist. Each issue included a non-fiction section with crime anecdotes, and a department called "The Zero Hour" which narrated stories about anonymous crime-fighters—likely to be fabricated, according to Sampson.

The magazine was cancelled after only three issues. Fleming-Roberts had already written a fourth novel, but it was never published and is now in a private collection.

== Bibliographic details ==
Captain Zero published three issues, dated November 1949, and January and March 1950. The publisher was Recreational Reading, Inc, of Kokomo, Indiana, which was a subsidiary of Popular Publications in New York, where the editorial offices were. There was a single volume of three numbers. All three issues were pulp format, 128 pages, and 25 cents. According to pulp historian Robert Weinberg, Mary Gnaedinger was the editor who created the magazine; Alden H. Norton edited the individual issues, but according to bibliographer Phil Stephensen-Payne, the editor was Henry Steeger.

== Sources ==
- Sampson, Robert (1983). "Captain Zero". In Cook, Michael L. (ed.). Mystery, Detective, and Espionage Magazines. Westport, Connecticut: Greenwood Press. pp. 83–87. ISBN 0-313-23310-1.
- Weinberg, Robert (1985). "Captain Zero". In Tymn, Marshall B.; Ashley, Mike (eds.). Science Fiction, Fantasy and Weird Fiction Magazines. Westport, Connecticut: Greenwood Press. pp. 158–159. ISBN 0-3132-1221-X.
