= Captain Z-Ro =

American children's television show

- Genre: Science fiction Children; Educational
- Created by: Roy Steffens
- Written by: Roy Steffens
- Directed by: Dave Butler
- Starring: Roy Steffens; Bob Turnbull; Bruce Haynes
- Country of origin: United States
- Original language: English
- No. of episodes: 77 (including 51 live episodes and 26 half-hour filmed episodes)

Production
- Producer: Kathleen K. Rawlings
- Production location: San Francisco
- Camera setup: Single-camera
- Running time: 15 mins. (1951–1953); 24 mins. (1955–1956)
- Production companies: W.A. Palmer Films; Captain Z-Ro Productions

Original release
- Network: KRON-TV/ KTTV; Syndication
- Release: November 1951 – June 10, 1956

Captain Z-Ro (pronounced "zero" Audio (US)) is an American children's television show that ran locally on KRON-TV in San Francisco and KTTV in Los Angeles, from November 1951 through 1953, and was later nationally syndicated in the United States, beginning December 18, 1955, and ending its run of original episodes on June 10, 1956. It remained in syndication until 1960. Modeled on the science fiction space operas popular at the time (cf. Captain Video and Space Patrol), it featured sets and costumes emulating the futuristic designs of Buck Rogers and Flash Gordon.

== Premise ==
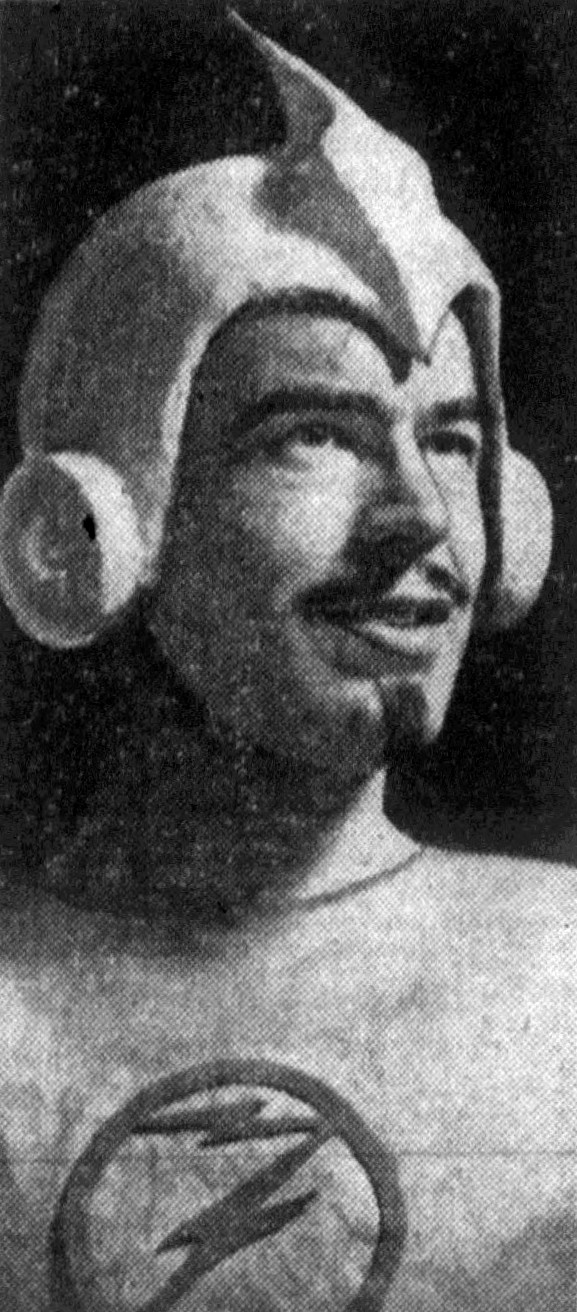
Captain Z-Ro played by series creator and writer Roy Steffens, circa 1953.

Scientist Captain Z-Ro, working in his remote laboratory, safeguarded mankind and history from impending harm. He had a time machine, the ZX-99, both to view history and to send someone back in time. Each week, he and his teenage assistant Jet would view an episode in time and inevitably see that some event was unfolding contrary to history (e.g., King John not signing the Magna Carta). Captain Z-Ro would then send Jet back in time to intervene and ensure that history played out as originally recorded. Over the years, plots involved Z-Ro and Jet rescuing a wide range of historical figures, including Genghis Khan, Marco Polo, Ferdinand Magellan, William the Conqueror, Benedict Arnold, William Tell, Christopher Columbus, Blackbeard, Captain Cook, Leonardo da Vinci, Robin Hood, George Washington, Attila the Hun, Hernando Cortez, and Daniel Boone.

Like early episodes of Doctor Who, which premiered in the UK more than a decade later, most episodes were melodramatic history lessons for children. No serious effort was made to explain how the time machine worked, and time travel conundrums (such as the grandfather paradox) were likewise glossed over.

Each week after the last commercial, the announcer would intone: "Be sure to be standing by when we again transmit you to the remote location on planet Earth where Captain Z-Ro and his associates will conduct another experiment in time and space."

== Format and effects ==
The special effect to represent time travel was a simple dissolve shot, set among flashing lights, blinking oscilloscopes and numerous levers and knobs.

Early episodes (1951-1953) were kinescope recordings (film shot off a TV monitor). Later shows for syndication (1955-1956) were shot directly to 16mm film at W.A. Palmer Film, as the show moved from a 15-minute kinescoped format on local stations KRON-TV in San Francisco & KTTV in Los Angeles to a 30-minute nationally syndicated film format distributed by the Atlas Television Corporation.

The kinescoped shows ended sometime in 1953. The 26 filmed episodes were aired from December 18, 1955, through June 10, 1956. There was a 2-year hiatus between the end of the 51-episode kinescope series and the 26 episodes later recorded on film and distributed by Atlas.
