= Gertrude Barrows Bennett =

American writer

- Born: Gertrude Mabel Barrows; September 18, 1884; Minneapolis, Minnesota
- Died: February 2, 1948 (aged 63); San Francisco, California
- Occupations: Writer, stenographer
- Spouse(s): Stewart Bennett; Carl Franklin Gaster
- Writing career
- Pen name: Francis Stevens
- Period: 1917–23 (fiction writer)
- Genres: Science fiction, fantasy
- Notable works: The Citadel of Fear; The Heads of Cerberus; Claimed

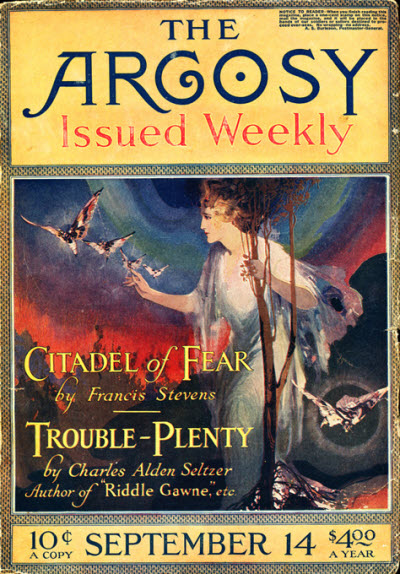
Citadel of Fear was serialized in The Argosy in 1918.

Gertrude Barrows Bennett (September 18, 1884 – February 2, 1948), known by the pseudonym Francis Stevens, was a pioneering American author of fantasy and science fiction. Bennett wrote a number of fantasies between 1917 and 1923 and has been called "the woman who invented dark fantasy".

Her most famous books include Claimed (which Augustus T. Swift, in a letter to The Argosy called "One of the strangest and most compelling science fantasy novels you will ever read") (Note: Swift was at one time thought to be a pseudonym of H.P. Lovecraft but this has been proven spurious. He was a real individual in Providence. See the section Influence for more detail. Rock Publishing attributes the quotation to Lovecraft.) and the lost world novel The Citadel of Fear.

Bennett also wrote an early dystopian novel, The Heads of Cerberus (1919).

== Life ==
Gertrude Mabel Barrows was born in Minneapolis in 1884, to Charles and Caroline Barrows (née Hatch). Her father, a Civil War veteran from Illinois, died in 1892. Gertrude completed school through the eighth grade, then attended night school in hopes of becoming an illustrator (a goal she never achieved). Instead, she began working as a stenographer, a job she held on and off for the rest of her life.

In 1909 Barrows married Stewart Bennett, a British journalist and explorer, and moved to Philadelphia. A year later her husband died during a tropical storm while on a treasure hunting expedition. With a new-born daughter to raise, Bennett continued working as a stenographer. When her father died toward the end of World War I, Bennett assumed care for her invalid mother.

Virtually all of Bennett's work dates from 1917 to 1920, when she began to write short stories and novels to support the household. She stopped writing when her mother died in 1920; one later work published in 1923 appears to have been written during the late 'teens, and submitted to Weird Tales when that magazine was just starting up.

In the mid-1920s, Bennett placed her daughter in the care of friends and moved to California. Because she was estranged from her daughter, for a number of years researchers believed Bennett died in 1939 – a 1939 letter from her daughter was returned as undeliverable, and her daughter did not hear from Bennett after this date. However, new research, including her death certificate, shows that she died in 1948.

== Writing career ==
Gertrude Mabel Barrows wrote her first short story at age 17, a science fiction story titled "The Curious Experience of Thomas Dunbar". She mailed the story to Argosy, then one of the top pulp magazines. The story was accepted and published in the March 1904 issue, under the byline "G. M. Barrows". Although the initials disguised her gender, this appears to be the first instance of an American female author publishing science fiction, and using her real name. That same month, Youth's Companion published her poetry.

Once Bennett began to take care of her mother, she decided to return to fiction writing as a means of supporting her family. The first story she completed after her return to writing was the novella "The Nightmare", which appeared in All-Story Weekly in 1917. The story is set on an island separated from the rest of the world, on which evolution has taken a different course. "The Nightmare" resembles Edgar Rice Burroughs' The Land That Time Forgot, itself published a year later. While Bennett had submitted "The Nightmare" under her own name, she had asked to use a pseudonym if it was published. The magazine's editor chose not to use the pseudonym Bennett suggested (Jean Vail) and instead credited the story to Francis Stevens. When readers responded positively to the story, Bennett chose to continue writing under the name.

Over the next few years, Bennett wrote a number of short stories and novellas. Her short story "Friend Island" (All-Story Weekly, 1918), for example, is set in a 22nd-century ruled by women. Another story is the novella "Serapion" (Argosy, 1920), about a man possessed by a supernatural creature. This story has been released in an electronic book entitled Possessed: A Tale of the Demon Serapion, with three other stories by her. Many of her short stories have been collected in The Nightmare and Other Tales of Dark Fantasy (University of Nebraska Press, 2004).

In 1918 she published her first, and perhaps best, novel The Citadel of Fear (Argosy, 1918). This lost world story focuses on a forgotten Aztec city, which is "rediscovered" during World War I. It was the introduction to a 1952 reprint edition of the novel which revealed that "Francis Stevens" was Bennett's pen-name.

A year later she published her only science fiction novel, The Heads of Cerberus (The Thrill Book, 1919). One of the first dystopian novels, the book features a "grey dust from a silver phial" which transports anyone who inhales it to a totalitarian Philadelphia of 2118 AD.

One of Bennett's most famous novels was Claimed! (Argosy, 1920; reprinted 1966, 2004, 2018), in which a supernatural artifact summons an ancient and powerful god to early 20th century New Jersey. Augustus T. Swift called the novel "One of the strangest and most compelling science fantasy novels you will ever read".

Apparently The Thrill Book had accepted more of her stories when it was cancelled in October 1919, only seven months after the first issue. These were never published and became lost. It has been hypothesized that "Sunfire", which appeared in Weird Tales in 1923, was one of these stories that had originally been accepted by Thrill Book; it was the only 'new' story published by Bennett after 1920, although it was almost certainly written in 1919 or earlier.

== Influence ==
Bennett has been credited as having "the best claim at creating the new genre of dark fantasy". It has been said that Bennett's writings influenced both H. P. Lovecraft and A. Merritt, both of whom "emulated Bennett's earlier style and themes". Lovecraft was even said to have praised Bennett's work. However, there is controversy about whether or not this actually happened and the praise appears to have resulted from letters wrongly attributed to Lovecraft.

As for Merritt, for several decades critics and readers believed "Francis Stevens" was a pseudonym of his. This rumor only ended with the 1952 reprinting of Citadel of Fear, which featured a biographical introduction of Bennett by Lloyd Arthur Eshbach.

Critic Sam Moskowitz said she was the "greatest woman writer of science fiction in the period between Mary Wollstonecraft Shelley and C.L. Moore".

Because Bennett was the first American woman to have her fantasy and science fiction widely published, she qualifies as a pioneering female fantasy author.

== Bibliography ==
=== Novels ===
- The Citadel of Fear (serialized in Argosy, September 14 to October 6, 1918). Reprinted in Famous Fantastic Mysteries, February 1942; Paperback Library, 1970; Carroll & Graf, 1984; Armchair Fiction, 2015.
- The Heads of Cerberus (serialized in Thrill Book, August 15 to October 15, 1919). Reprinted by Polaris Press, 1952; Carroll & Graf, 1984; Dover, 2014; Modern Library, 2019; MIT Press, 2024.
- Avalon (serialized in Argosy, August 16 to September 6, 1919). Reprinted in Claimed! and Avalon (Black Dog Books, 2018).
- Claimed (serialized in Argosy, March 6 to March 20, 1920). Reprinted in Famous Fantastic Mysteries, April 1941; Avalon Books, 1966; Carroll & Graf, 1985; Penguin, 2024.

=== Short stories and novellas ===
- "The Curious Experience of Thomas Dunbar" (Argosy, March 1904; as "G. M. Barrows")
- "The Nightmare" (All-Story Weekly, April 14, 1917)
- "The Labyrinth" (serialized in All-Story Weekly, July 27 to August 10, 1918)
- "Friend Island" (All-Story Weekly, September 7, 1918). Reprinted in Fantastic Novels, September 1950; reprinted in Under the Moons of Mars, edited by Sam Moskowitz, 1970.
- "Behind the Curtain" (All-Story Weekly, September 21, 1918). Reprinted in Famous Fantastic Mysteries, January 1940.
- "Unseen—Unfeared" (People's Favorite Magazine February 10, 1919). Reprinted in Horrors Unknown, edited by Sam Moskowitz, 1971.
- "The Elf-Trap" (Argosy, July 5, 1919). Reprinted in Fantastic Novels Magazine, November 1949.
- "Serapion" (serialized in Argosy Weekly, June 19, June 26, July 3, and July 10, 1920). Reprinted in Famous Fantastic Mysteries, July 1942.
- "Sunfire" (1923; original printed in two parts in Weird Tales, July–August 1923, and Weird Tales, September 1923). Reprinted in 1996 by Apex International.

=== Collections ===
- The Nightmare and Other Tales of Dark Fantasy, ed. Gary Hoppenstand (University of Nebraska Press, 2004; contains all Stevens' known short fiction ("The Nightmare", "The Labyrinth", "Friend Island", "Behind the Curtain", "Unseen-Unfeared", "The Elf-Trap", "Serapion" and "Sunfire"), except for "The Curious Experience of Thomas Dunbar".
- The Heads of Cerberus and Other Stories, ed. Lisa Yaszek (MIT Press, 2024). Includes: The Heads of Cerberus, "The Curious Experience of Thomas Dunbar", "Friend Island", "Behind the Curtain", "Unseen-Unfeared" and "The Elf-Trap".

== See also ==
- Feminist science fiction
- Women science fiction authors
- Women in science fiction
