= A. Merritt =

American novelist

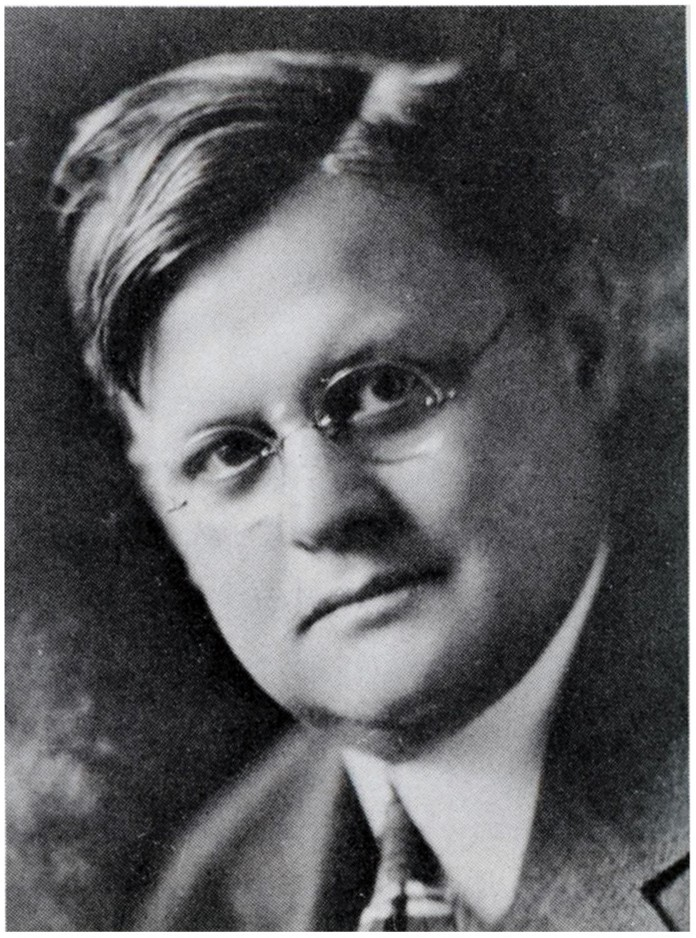
- Merritt circa 1920
- Born: Abraham Grace Merritt; January 20, 1884; Beverly, New Jersey, US
- Died: August 21, 1943 (aged 59); Indian Rocks Beach, Florida, US
- Occupations: Journalist, writer
- Writing career
- Pen name: W. Fenimore (one 1923 story)
- Period: 1917–1943 (fiction)
- Genres: Speculative fiction, supernatural fiction
- Subject: Weekly news supplement

Abraham Grace Merritt (January 20, 1884 – August 21, 1943) – known by his byline, A. Merritt – was an American Sunday magazine editor and a writer of fantastic fiction.

The Science Fiction and Fantasy Hall of Fame inducted him in 1999, its fourth class of two deceased and two living writers.

== Life ==
Born in Beverly, New Jersey, he moved to Philadelphia, Pennsylvania in 1894. Originally trained in law, he turned to journalism, first as a correspondent and later as editor. According to Peter Haining, Merritt survived a harrowing experience while a young reporter at The Philadelphia Inquirer about which he refused to ever speak, but would, as Haining claims, mark a turning point in Merritt's life. He was assistant editor of The American Weekly from 1912 to 1937 under Morrill Goddard, then its editor from 1937 until his death. As editor, he hired the unheralded new artists Virgil Finlay and Hannes Bok and promoted the work done on polio by Sister Elizabeth Kenny.

His fiction, eight complete novels and a number of short stories, was only a sideline to his journalism career. One of the best-paid journalists of his era, Merritt made $25,000 per year by 1919, and at the end of his life was earning $100,000 yearly—exceptional sums for the period. His financial success allowed him to pursue world travel—he invested in real estate in Jamaica and Ecuador—and exotic hobbies, like cultivating orchids and plants linked to witchcraft and magic (monkshood, wolfbane, blue datura, peyote, and cannabis).

He was described as a hypochondriac who talked endlessly about his medical symptoms, and showed eccentric behavior like a need to try out any food, tobacco and medicine he found on his coworkers desks. Occasionally he would dress in a kilt and play serenades for his coworkers with some of his huge collection of instruments he kept in a locked closet at work. He was well liked for his fairness and inability to fire any employees.

Merritt married twice, once in the 1910s to Eleanore Ratcliffe, with whom he raised an adopted daughter, and again in the 1930s to Eleanor H. Johnson. He lived in the Hollis Park Gardens neighborhood of Queens, New York City, where he accumulated collections of weapons, carvings, and primitive masks from his travels, as well as a library of occult literature that reportedly exceeded 5000 volumes. He died suddenly of a heart attack, at his winter home in Indian Rocks Beach, Florida, in 1943.

== Writing ==
Merritt's writings were heavily influenced by H. Rider Haggard, Robert W. Chambers, Helena Blavatsky and Gertrude Barrows Bennett (writing as Francis Stevens), with Merritt having "emulated Bennett's earlier style and themes." Merritt's stories typically revolve around conventional pulp magazine themes: lost civilizations, hideous monsters, etc. His heroes are gallant Irishmen or Scandinavians, his villains treacherous Germans or Russians and his heroines often virginal, mysterious and scantily clad.

What sets Merritt apart from the typical pulp author, however, is his lush, florid prose style and his exhaustive, at times exhausting, penchant for adjective-laden detail. Merritt's fondness for micro-description nicely complements the pointillistic style of Bok's illustrations.

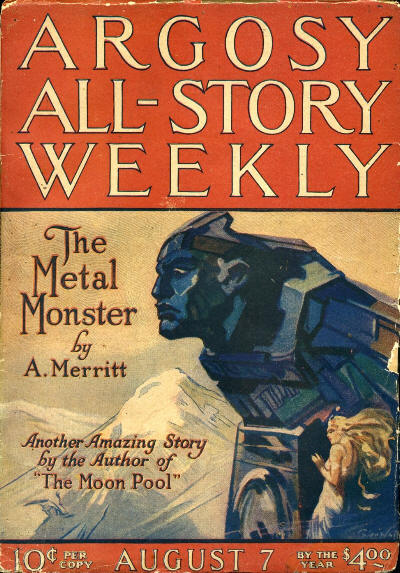
The Metal Monster inaugurated Argosy All-Story Weekly (August 7, 1920)

Merritt's first fantasy story was published in 1917, "Through the Dragon Glass" in the November 14 issue of Frank Munsey's All-Story Weekly. Other short stories and serial novels followed in the Munsey magazines All-Story, Argosy All-Story, and Argosy: (Note: All-Story and Munsey's much older magazine The Argosy were merged in August 1920, as Argosy All-Story Weekly. The Frank Munsey Company magazines were reorganized again in October 1929 (four years after Munsey's death), after which Merritt's stories appeared in the weekly Argosy.) The People of the Pit (1918), "The Moon Pool" (1918), The Conquest of the Moon Pool (1919), "Three Lines of Old French" (1919), The Metal Monster (1920), The Face in the Abyss (1923), The Ship of Ishtar (1924), Seven Footprints to Satan (1927), The Snake Mother (1930), Burn Witch Burn! (1932), Dwellers in the Mirage (1932), and Creep, Shadow! (1934). Meanwhile, rather few of his stories appeared elsewhere: The Pool of the Stone God (in his own American Weekly, 1923), The Woman of the Wood (Weird Tales, 1926), The Metal Emperor (Science and Invention, 1927), and The Drone Man (Fantasy Magazine, 1934).

Merritt also contributed to the round robin story “The Challenge from Beyond” with Lovecraft, Robert E. Howard, C. L. Moore, and Frank Belknap Long.

The Fox Woman and the Blue Pagoda (1946) combined an unfinished story with a conclusion written by Merritt's friend Hannes Bok. The Fox Woman and Other Stories (1949) collected the same fragment, minus Bok's conclusion, with Merritt's short stories. The book The Black Wheel was published in 1948, after Merritt's death; it was written by Bok using previously unpublished material as well. Both these books were also illustrated by Bok and published by the small press The New Collectors Group in hardcover.

After Merritt's death, Sam Moskowitz discovered a number of poems among his papers. Though some may have been written by other authors, they were credited to Merritt when published.

== Reputation ==
Merritt was a major influence on H. P. Lovecraft and Richard Shaver, and highly esteemed by his friend and frequent collaborator Hannes Bok, a science fiction illustrator. Karl Edward Wagner included Burn Witch Burn on his list of "The Thirteen Best Supernatural Horror Novels" in the May 1983 issue of The Twilight Zone Magazine. Michael Moorcock and James Cawthorn list The Ship of Ishtar and Dwellers in the Mirage as two of the novels in their book Fantasy: the 100 Best Books, describing the former book as Merritt "at the peak of his powers", and Merritt's work as a whole being full of "memorable images". Robert Bloch also included Burn Witch Burn on his list of favourite horror novels. Gary Gygax, co-creator of the game Dungeons & Dragons, listed Merritt in "Appendix N" of the Dungeon Masters Guide and often noted that he was one of his favorite fantasy authors. In the Lensman series by E. E. Smith, there is a reference to the novel Dwellers in the Mirage in which the protagonist Kimball Kinnison references the book and a quotation from it "Luka—turn your wheel so I need not slay this woman!"

== Work ==
=== Novels ===
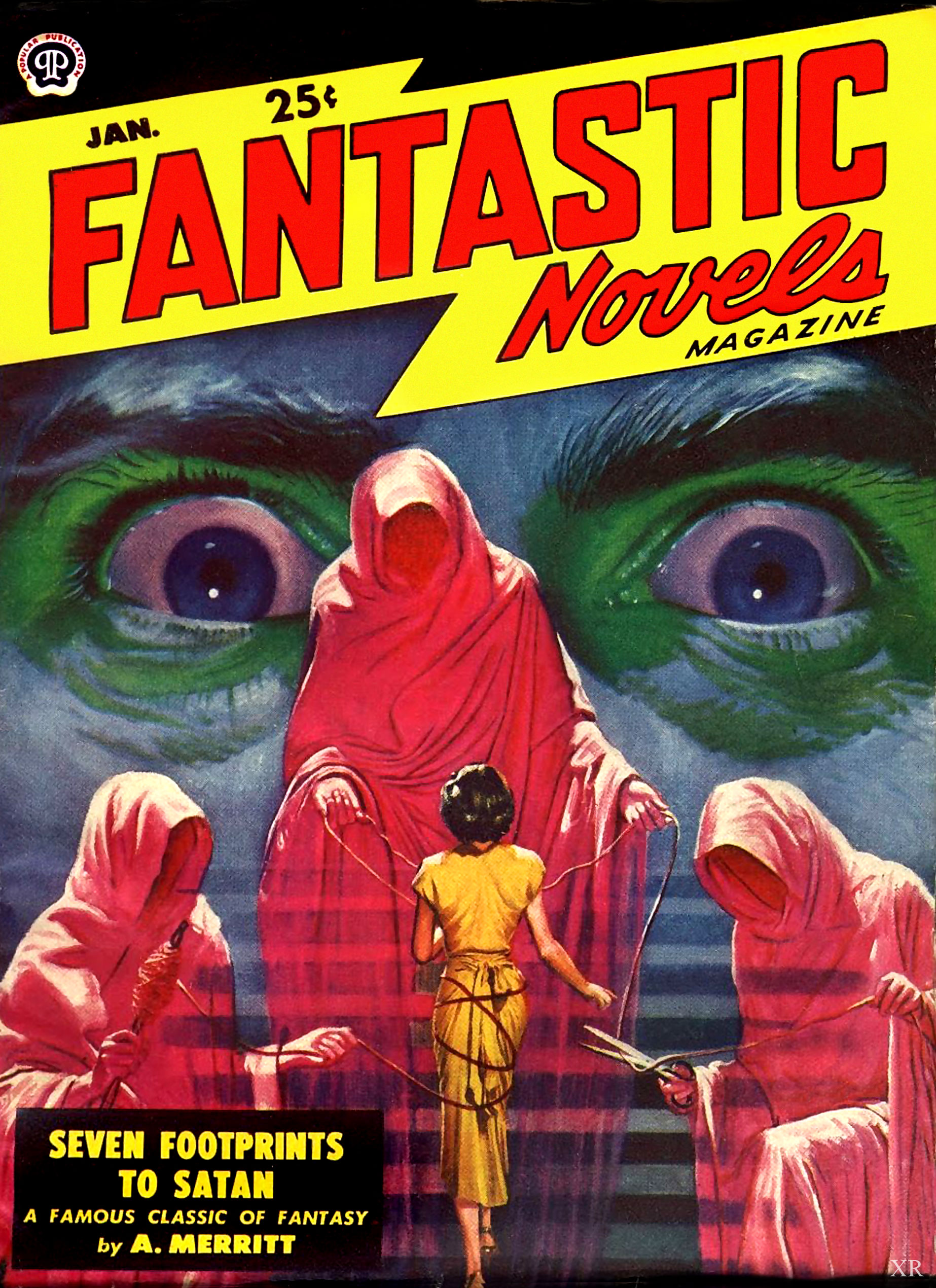
Seven Footprints to Satan was republished in the January 1949 issue of Fantastic Novels.

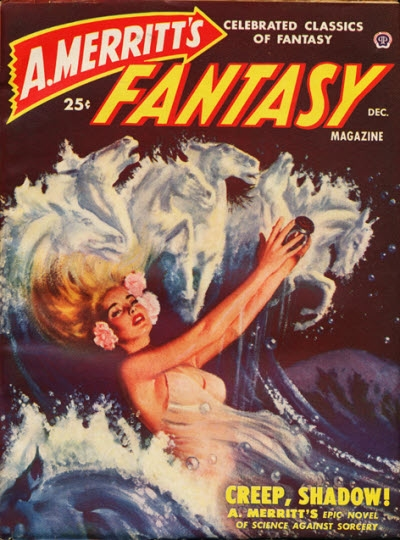
Creep, Shadow! was reprinted in the debut issue of A. Merritt's Fantasy Magazine in 1949.

- The Moon Pool (fix-up, 1919) Available online
  (The Moon Pool (1918) + Conquest of the Moon Pool (1919))
- The Metal Monster (1920) Available online
- The Ship of Ishtar (1924) Available online
- Seven Footprints to Satan (1927) Available online
- The Face in the Abyss (fix-up, 1931) Available online
  (The Face in the Abyss (1923) + The Snake Mother (1930))
- Dwellers in the Mirage (1932) Available online
- Burn, Witch, Burn! (1932) Available online
- Creep, Shadow! (1934) Available online

=== Short stories ===
- "Through The Dragon Glass" (1917) Available online
- "The People of the Pit" (1918) Available online
- "Three Lines of Old French" (1919) Available online
- "Prologue" (The Metal Monster, 1920)
- The Pool of the Stone God (as W. Fenimore, 1923) Available online
- "The Women of the Wood" (1926) Available online
- "The Drone" (also known as "The Drone Man", 1934) Available online
- "The Rhythm of the Spheres" (originally a chapter called "The Last Poet and the Robots" or "The Last Poet & the Wrongness of Space" in the 1934 round robin novel titled Cosmos, revised in 1936 as a stand-alone work) Available online

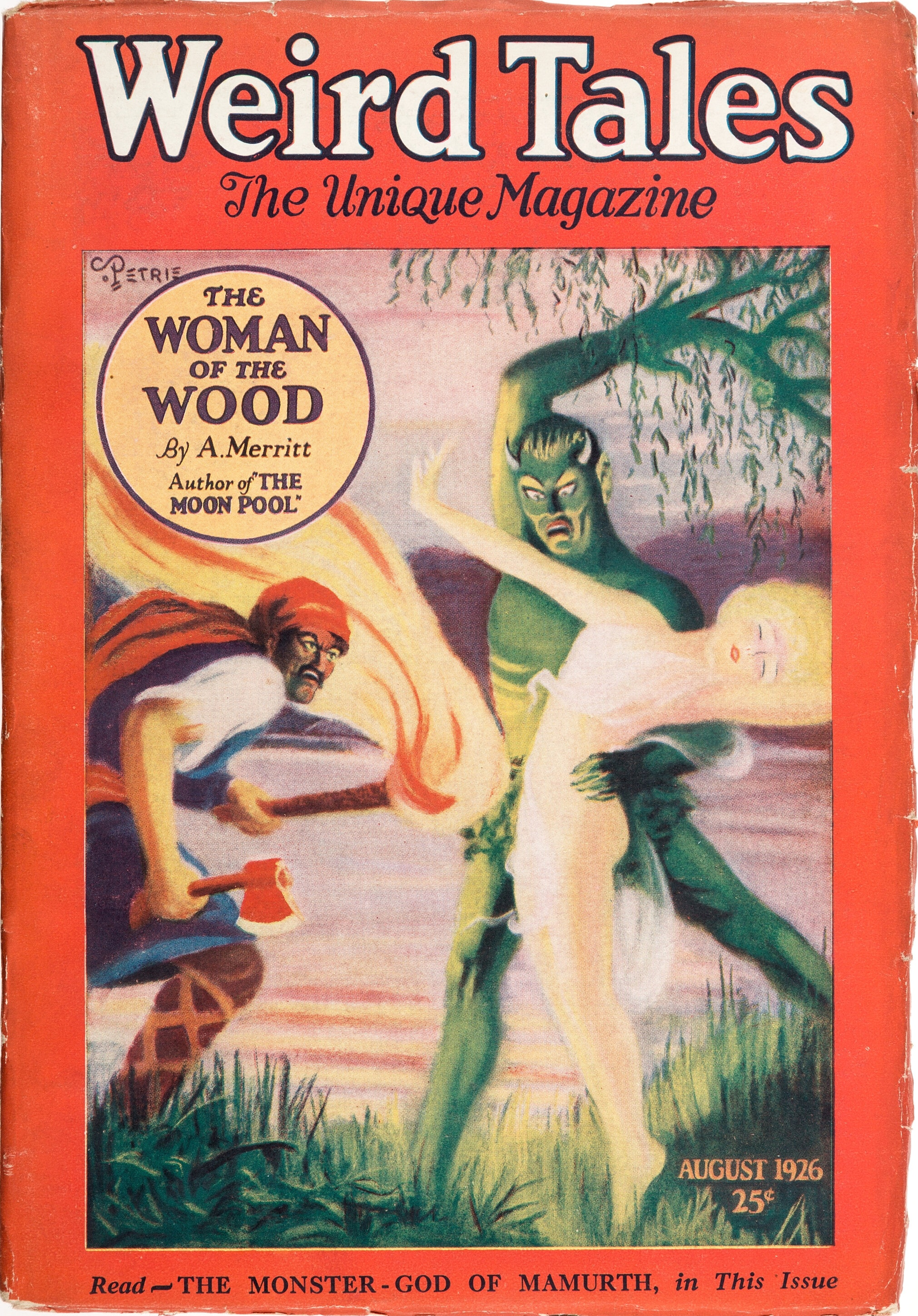
The August 1926 Weird Tales cover-featured the first publication of "The Woman of the Wood".

- "The Whelming of Cherkis" (excerpt from The Metal Monster, 1946)
- "When Old Gods Wake" (fragment, 1948) Available online
- "The White Road" (fragment, 1949) Available online
- "The Fox Woman" (incomplete, 1949) Available online
- "Pilgrimage, or, Obi Giese" (1985)
- "Bootleg and Witches" (fragment, 1985)
- "The Devil in the Heart" (outline, 1985)
- "The Dwellers in the Mirage" (original ending of the novel with same name, 1985)

=== Short story collections ===
- The Fox Woman and Other Stories (1949)

The Fox Woman, 1946
The People of the Pit, 1917
Through the Dragon Glass, 1917
The Drone, 1934
The Last Poet and the Robots, 1934
Three Lines of Old French, 1919
The White Road, 1949
When Old Gods Wake, 1948
The Woman of the Wood, 1934

=== Poems ===
- "The Birth of Art" (1904)
- "Song for Wood Horns" (also known as "The Wind Trail", 1910)
- "The Silver Birches" (1940)
- "Old Trinity Churchyard" (5 A. M. Spring) (1941)
- "Sylvane – The Silver Birches" (1973)
- "In the Cathedral" (1974)
- "2000 (The Triple Cities)" (1985)
- "Song for Wood Horn..." (1985)
- "Silvane—The Silver Birches" (1985)
- "Madonna" (1985)
- "The Ladies of the Walnut Tree (A Legend of Tuscany)" (fragments, 1985)
- "Court of the Moon" (fragment, 1985)
- "L'envoi to Life" (1985)
- "Screens" (1985)
- "Sir Barnabas" (1985)
- "In the Subway" (1985)
- "Runes" (1985)
- "Eheu Fugaces..." (1985)
- "A Song for Christmas" (1985)
- "Comic Ragtime Tune" (1985)
- "Behold the Night He Cometh" (1985)
- "You Looked at Me" (1985)
- "Dream Song" (1985)
- "Castle of Dreams" (1985)
- "I Wonder Why?" (1985)
- "My Heart and I" (1985)
- Think of Me (1985)
- "The Ballad of the Cub" (1985)
- "Piddling Pete" (1985)
- "The Winged Flames" (1985)

=== Collaborations ===
- "The Challenge from Beyond" (round robin short story, with C.L. Moore, H.P. Lovecraft, Robert E. Howard, and Frank Belknap Long, 1935) Available online
- Cosmos (round robin novel, chapter 11, 1932–34) Available online
- The Fox Woman and the Blue Pagoda (novel, Hannes Bok fused Merritt's unfinished story with his own conclusion, 1946)
- The Black Wheel (novel, first seven chapters written by Merritt, completed by Hannes Bok, 1947)

=== Essays ===
- A. Merritt on Modern Witchcraft (1932)
- Concerning "Burn, Witch, Burn" (1932)
- Letter (Weird Tales, November 1935) (1935)
- Man and the Universe (1940)
- A. Merritt (1940)
- How We Found Circe (1942)
- A Tribute (1942)
- Letter to Mr. Louis De Casanova, July 23, 1931 (1985)
- Letters and Correspondence (1985)
- An Autobiography of A. Merritt (1985) with Walter Wentz
- A. Merritt—His Life and Times (1985) with Jack Chapman Miske
- What is Fantasy? (1985)
- Background of "Dwellers in the Mirage" (1985)
- Background of "Burn, Witch, Burn" (1985)
- Background of "Creep, Shadow!" (1985)
- A. Merritt's Own Selected Credo (1985)

== Adaptations ==
Merritt's work has been adapted only rarely for films. These include:

- Seven Footprints to Satan (1929), adapted from the novel of the same name and directed by Benjamin Christensen.
- The Devil-Doll (1936), adapted from the novel Burn Witch Burn! and directed by Tod Browning.
- Muñecos infernales (1961), adapted from the novel Burn Witch Burn! (uncredited) and directed by Benito Alazraki.
