= Fantastic Novels =

US pulp science fiction magazine

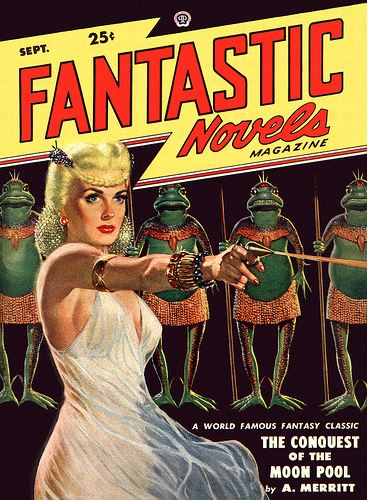
- Mary Gnaedinger continued to reprint work by A. Merritt in the second series of Fantastic Novels (September 1948 issue pictured).
- Editor: Mary Gnaedinger
- Categories: Science fiction Fantasy; Pulp
- Frequency: Bimonthly
- Founded: 1940
- Final issue: 1951
- Company: Munsey Company; Popular Publications
- Country: United States; Canada; Great Britain
- Based in: New York City
- Language: English

Fantastic Novels was an American science fiction and fantasy pulp magazine published by the Munsey Company of New York City from 1940 to 1941, and again by Popular Publications, also of New York City, from 1948 to 1951. It was a companion to Famous Fantastic Mysteries. Like that magazine, it mostly reprinted science fiction and fantasy classics from earlier decades, such as works by A. Merritt, George Allan England, and Victor Rousseau, though it occasionally published reprints of more recent material, such as Earth's Last Citadel by Henry Kuttner and C. L. Moore.

The magazine lasted for 5 issues in its first incarnation, and for another 20 in the revived version from Popular Publications. Mary Gnaedinger edited both series; her interest in reprinting Merritt's work helped make him one of the better-known fantasy writers of the era. A Canadian edition from 1948 to 1951 reprinted 17 issues of the second series; two others were reprinted in Great Britain in 1950 and 1951.

== Publication history ==
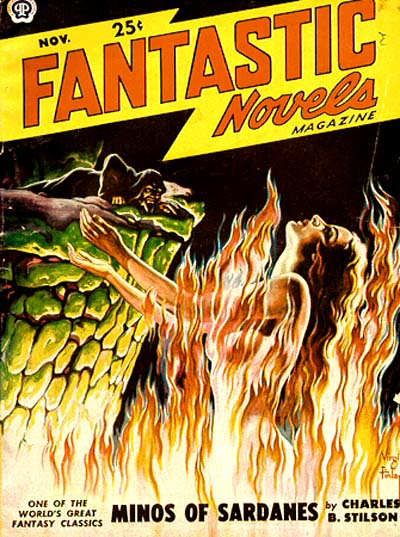
The cover of the November 1949 issue, by Virgil Finlay

In the early 20th century, science fiction stories were frequently published in popular magazines, with the Munsey Company, a major pulp magazine publisher, printing a great deal of science fiction. In 1926 Amazing Stories became the first specialist pulp magazine publisher of science fiction. Munsey continued to print science fiction in Argosy during the 1930s, and in 1939 took advantage of the new genre's growing popularity by launching Famous Fantastic Mysteries, a vehicle to reprint the most popular fantasy and science fiction stories from the Munsey magazines.

The new title immediately became successful, and demand for reprints of old favorites was such that Munsey decided to launch an additional magazine, Fantastic Novels, in July 1940, edited, like Famous Fantastic Mysteries, by Mary Gnaedinger. The two magazines were placed on bimonthly schedules, arranged to alternate with each other, though the schedule slipped slightly with the fifth issue of Fantastic Novels, dated April 1941 but following the January 1941 issue. Fantastic Novels was suspended after that issue and merged with Famous Fantastic Mysteries. The stated reason was that Famous Fantastic Mysteries "is apparently the favorite title", but it seems likely that production difficulties caused by World War II played a part. The June 1941 and August 1941 issues of Famous Fantastic Mysteries both carried the slogan "Combined with Fantastic Novels Magazine" on the cover.

Fantastic Novels reappeared in 1948 through Popular Publications, which had acquired Famous Fantastic Mysteries from Munsey at the end of 1942. Gnaedinger remained editor of Famous Fantastic Mysteries when Popular took over, and was editor of the second incarnation of Fantastic Novels. The March 1948 issue, the first of the new series, was catalogued volume 1, number 6, as if there had been no break in publication. This version lasted for a further 20 issues, ending without notice with the June 1951 issue. It was apparently a sudden decision; the final issue had announced plans to reprint Otis Adelbert Kline's Maza of the Moon.

== Contents ==
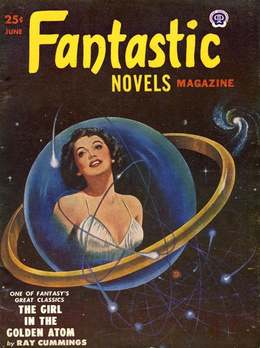
Fantastic Novels ended without notice with the June 1951 issue.

Fantastic Novels came into existence because of the demand from readers of Famous Fantastic Mysteries for book-length reprints. Gnaedinger observed that "Everyone seems to have realized that although [the] set-up of five to seven stories with two serials running, was highly satisfactory, that the long list of novels would have to be speeded up somehow". When the new magazine was launched, Famous Fantastic Mysteries was partway through serialization of Austin Hall and Homer Eon Flint's The Blind Spot, with the third episode appearing in the May/June 1940 issue. Rather than complete the serialization, Gnaedinger printed the novel in its entirety in the first issue of Fantastic Novels, ensuring that readers of Famous Fantastic Mysteries would also acquire the new magazine. Over the next four issues she printed Ray Cummings' People of the Golden Atom, Ralph Milne Farley's The Radio Beasts, and two novels by A. Merritt: The Snake Mother and The Dwellers in the Mirage. Gnaedinger's interest in reprinting Merritt's work helped make him one of the better-known fantasy writers of the era.

In the second series, from 1948 to 1951, Gnaedinger continued to reprint work by Merritt, along with other reader favorites from the Munsey years. Works by George Allan England, Victor Rousseau, Ray Cummings, and Francis Stevens (the pen name of Gertrude Barrows Bennett) appeared, as well as (occasionally) reprints of more recent work, such as Earth's Last Citadel, by Henry Kuttner and C. L. Moore, which had been serialized in Argosy in 1943. In the early 1950s, when first Fantastic Novels and two years later Famous Fantastic Mysteries ceased publication, it is likely that the audience for science fiction was growing too sophisticated for these early works.

Each issue, except the last one, featured a lead novel with additional short fiction. The cover artwork was mostly by Virgil Finlay, Lawrence Stevens, Peter Stevens, and Norman Saunders, with one early cover contributed by Frank R. Paul. (Note: Both Lawrence Stevens' covers, and those by his son Peter, were signed "Lawrence".)

== Bibliographic details ==
	Jan	Feb	Mar	Apr	May	Jun	Jul	Aug	Sep	Oct	Nov	Dec
1940							1/1		1/2		1/3	
1941	1/4			1/5								
1948			1/6		2/1		2/2		2/3		2/4	
1949	2/5		2/6		3/1		3/2		3/3		3/4	
1950	3/5		3/6		4/1		4/2		4/3		4/4	
1951	4/5			4/6		5/1						
Issues of Fantastic Novels, showing volume and issue numbers. The editor was Mary Gnaedinger throughout.

Mary Gnaedinger edited Fantastic Novels for both the Munsey and Popular Publications series. Five issues appeared between July 1940 and April 1941, and an additional twenty from March 1948 to June 1951. The schedule was bimonthly, with only two irregularities: the issues that would have been dated March 1941 and March 1951 were each delayed by a month. The volume numbering was regular throughout, with four volumes of six numbers, and a final fifth volume of one number. The magazine was printed in pulp format throughout both series, and was priced at 20 cents for the first two issues; then 10 cents for the remainder of the first series and 25 cents for issues in the second series. Fantastic Novels was 144 pages for the first two issues, 128 pages for two issues, and 112 pages for the last issue of the first series; it was 132 pages from the start of the second series until the November 1950 issue, and then 128 pages for January 1951, and 112 pages for the last two issues.

A Canadian reprint edition ran from September 1948 to June 1951; these were published by the Toronto-based New Publications. They were half an inch taller than the U.S. editions and used different back-cover advertisements, but were otherwise identical to the U.S. issues of the same date. Two issues were released in Britain: a single issue was released in March 1950; it was a copy of the November 1949 U.S. issue but was neither numbered nor dated. The other British issue was a copy of the May 1949 issue, cut to only 64 pages; it was released in June 1951 and was undated but numbered 1. Both these issues were published by Pemberton's and distributed by Thorpe & Porter.

== Sources ==
- Ashley, Mike (2000). The Time Machines:The Story of the Science-Fiction Pulp Magazines from the beginning to 1950. Liverpool: Liverpool University Press. ISBN 0-85323-865-0.
- Clute, John; Nicholls, Peter (1993). The Encyclopedia of Science Fiction. New York: St. Martin's Press, Inc. ISBN 0-312-09618-6.
- Davin, Erik Leif (2006). Partners in Wonder. Lanham MD: Lexington Books. ISBN 0-7391-1267-8.
- Day, Donald B. (1952). Index to the Science Fiction Magazines. Portland OR: Perri Press.
- Tuck, Donald H. (1982). The Encyclopedia of Science Fiction and Fantasy: Volume 3. Chicago: Advent: Publishers, Inc. ISBN 0-911682-26-0.
- Tymn, Marshall B.; Ashley, Mike (1985). Science Fiction, Fantasy and Weird Fiction Magazines. Westport CT: Greenwood Press. ISBN 0-313-21221-X.
- Weinberg, Robert (1985). A Biographical Dictionary of Science Fiction and Fantasy Artists. Westport CT: Greenwood Press. ISBN 0-313-21221-X.
