= John W. Campbell bibliography =

Bibliography

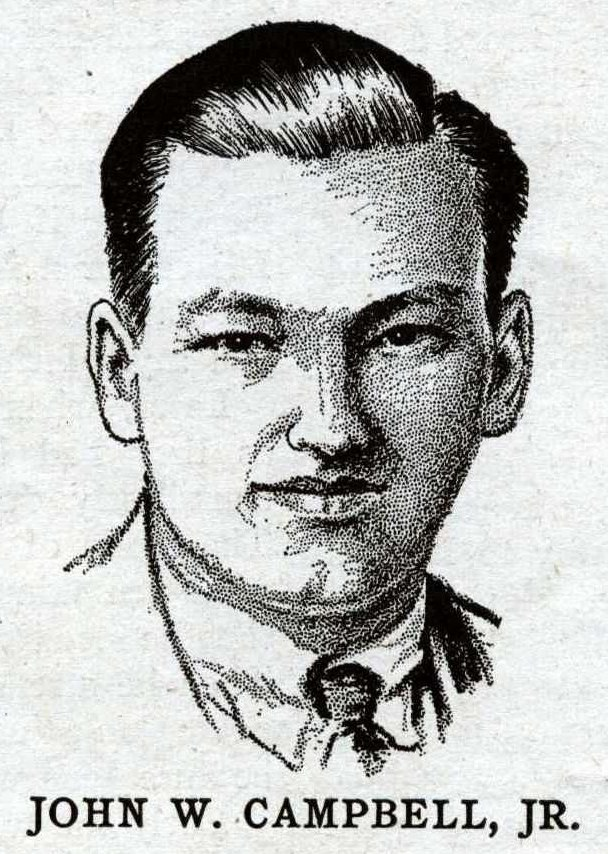
John W. Campbell Jr.

This is a bibliography of works by American writer John W. Campbell Jr.

The bibliography is in chronological order of first publication of the books. In most cases only first editions are shown for each title, with the following exceptions. Both British and US editions are shown for Who Goes There? as the title was changed. The Moon is Hell was released both as a novel and a short story collection; both versions are shown. Some confusing variants are shown in full for the Astounding Science Fiction Anthology and its derivatives; the situation is explained more fully in that section. Some other variant titles are listed separately, with notes indicating what the original titles were.

The main bibliographic sources are footnoted from this paragraph and provided much of the information in the following sections.^{,}^{,}^{,}^{,} Some footnotes annotating specific points are provided at the appropriate places below.

== Novels and fixups ==
- The Mightiest Machine. Providence, Rhode Island: Hadley Publishing Company, 1947; hardcover. Originally serialized over five issues in Astounding, starting in December 1934.
- The Incredible Planet. Reading: Pennsylvania: Fantasy Press, 1949; hardcover. Three linked novellas: "The Incredible Planet", "The Interstellar Search", and "The Infinite Atom", originally written as sequels to The Mightiest Machine but rejected by Tremaine for publication in Astounding. This is their first publication, so the book is not a fixup in the usual sense, although the stories were not originally intended for publication as a novel.
- The Moon is Hell. London: New English Library, 1975; paperback. See the entry in the short story collection section below.
- The Black Star Passes. Reading, Pennsylvania: Fantasy Press, 1953; hardcover. Fixup of three stories in Campbell's "Arcot, Morey and Wade" series, all from 1930: "Piracy Preferred", "Solarite", and "The Black Star Passes".
- Islands of Space. Reading, Pennsylvania: Fantasy Press, 1956; hardcover. Originally published in Amazing Stories Quarterly, Spring 1931.
- Invaders from the Infinite. Hicksville, New York: Gnome Press, 1961; hardcover simultaneous with: Reading, Pennsylvania: Fantasy Press, 1961; hardcover. Originally published in Amazing Stories Quarterly, Spring/Summer 1932. Note that the Gnome Press and Fantasy Press editions were very limited in release. The Reginald Index lists the Fantasy Press as the first edition but this is apparently incorrect. Both the Tuck Encyclopedia and the Chalker-Owings History list the editions as simultaneous. It was to have been a Fantasy Press project, but was handed off to Gnome when the Fantasy Press folded. Lloyd Eshbach of Fantasy Press printed the copies for both editions, including 100 that he did for longtime customers.
- The Ultimate Weapon. New York: Ace Books, Inc., 1966; paperback. Bound dos-a-dos with Campbell's The Planeteers, as Ace Double G-585; see below. Originally serialized in the October and November 1936 Astoundings as Uncertainty.
- "Who Goes There?" Novellete originally published in Astounding, August 1938.

The Nicholls Encyclopedia mentions a 1952 chapbook, published in Australia, as the first edition of Who Goes There? as a standalone novel, but provides no bibliographic details. The story itself first saw book form in the 1948 Shasta collection; see below.

== Short story collections and omnibus editions ==
- Who Goes There?. Chicago: Shasta Publishers, 1948; hardcover. Collection of seven stories.
- The Moon Is Hell!. Reading, Pennsylvania: Fantasy Press, 1951; hardcover. Contains The Moon Is Hell! and also "The Elder Gods", which was originally published in the October 1939 Unknown as by Don A. Stuart, but which was actually a collaboration between John Campbell and Arthur J. Burks according to Contento. Chalker reports that Campbell purchased the story from Burks in order to use the concept. Note that this same title is listed above as a novel, since all later editions dropped this short story. The Tuck Encyclopedia and the Chalker History give the first edition as "Fantasy, 1950", whereas the Currey bibliography gives the first edition as "Fantasy Press, 1951". There does not seem to be support for the Tuck/Chalker date in other sources.
- Cloak of Aesir. Chicago: Shasta Publishers, 1952; hardcover. Collection of seven stories.
- The Thing and Other Stories. London: Fantasy Books, 1952; paperback. Reprint of the 1948 Shasta edition of Who Goes There?.
- Who Goes There?. New York: Dell Books, 1955; paperback. Six stories; drops three stories from the 1952 Shasta edition, and adds two others.
- The Planeteers. New York: Ace Books, Inc., 1966; paperback. Bound dos-a-dos with Campbell's The Ultimate Weapon, as Ace Double G-585; see above. This contains all five "Penton and Blake" stories, published in Thrilling Wonder Stories between 1936 and 1938.
- The Best of John W. Campbell. London: Sidgwick & Jackson, 1973; hardcover. Five stories, compiled by George Hay; with an introduction by James Blish.
- John W. Campbell Anthology. Garden City: Doubleday & Company, Inc., 1973; hardcover. Omnibus volume containing The Black Star Passes, Islands of Space, and Invaders from the Infinite.
- The Space Beyond. New York: Pyramid Books, 1976; paperback. Three previously unpublished stories – "Marooned", "All", and "The Space Beyond" – plus an introduction by Isaac Asimov and an afterword by George Zebrowski. "All" formed the basis for Robert A. Heinlein's novel Sixth Column.
- The Best of John W. Campbell. Garden City: Nelson Doubleday, Inc., 1976; hardcover. Note contents differ from 1973 volume with the same title; this selection was edited by Lester del Rey and contains eleven stories and one article, with an introduction by del Rey and an afterword by Campbell's wife. All but one story from the 1973 volume is included in this version.
- The Thing. London: Tandem Books Limited, 1976; paperback. Retitling of the 1952 Shasta edition of Who Goes There?
- A New Dawn: The Don A. Stuart Stories of John W. Campbell, Jr. Framingham: NESFA Press, 2003; hardcover. Contains all eighteen stories published as by Don A. Stuart; also includes an introductory essay by Barry N. Malzberg.

== Short stories ==
- Waterson & Gale:
  - "When the Atoms Failed" (1930, Amazing Stories)
  - "The Metal Horde" (1930)
- "The Voice of the Void" (1930)
- "The Derelicts of Ganymede" (1932)
- "The Last Evolution" (1932, Amazing Stories)
- Donald Barclay:
  - "The Electronic Siege" (1932)
  - "Space Rays" (1932)
- Beyond the End of Space:
  - "Beyond the End of Space" (Part 1 of 2) (1933)
  - "Beyond the End of Space" (Part 2 of 2) (1933)
- "The Battery of Hate" (1933)
- "Atomic Power" (1934)
- "The Irrelevant" (1934) (as Karl van Campen)
- Twilight:
  - "Twilight" (1934, Astounding, as Don A. Stuart)
  - "Night" (1935)
- "Blindness" (1935)
- The Machine:
  - "The Machine" (1935, Astounding as Stuart)
  - "The Invaders" (1935, Astounding as Stuart)
  - "Rebellion" (1935)
- "Conquest of the Planets" (1935)
- "The Escape" (1935)
- "Elimination" (1936)
- "Frictional Losses" (1936)
- "Uncertainty" (1936)
- Penton and Blake:
  - "The Brain Stealers of Mars" (1936)
  - "The Double Minds" (1937)
  - "The Immortality Seekers" (1937)
  - "The Tenth World" (1937)
  - "The Brain Pirates" (1938)
- Sarn:
  - "Out of Night" (1937)
  - "Cloak of Aesir" (1939)
- "Forgetfulness" (1937)
- "Dead Knowledge" (1938)
- "Planet of Eternal Night" (1939)
- "The Elder Gods" (1939) (with Arthur J. Burks)
- "The Idealists" (1954)
- "All" (1976)
- "Marooned" (1976)
- "The Space Beyond" (1976)

== Other ==
- Empire. New York: World Editions, 1951; paperback. Written (and bylined) by Clifford Simak from Campbell's plot. The book was apparently written by Campbell as a teenager; he was unable to find a publisher for it and turned it over to Simak to rewrite it for Astounding. Simak said of the book that "Empire was essentially a rewrite of John's plot. I may have taken a few of the ideas and action, but I didn't use any of his words. And I certainly tried to humanize his characters". Simak's version was, ironically, rejected by Campbell, and finally appeared in the Galaxy Novel series from World Editions. Currey indicates here that the quote from Simak is "via Muriel Becker", without giving more details. There is a Simak bibliography by Muriel R. Becker, which may be the source: Clifford D. Simak: A Primary and Secondary Bibliography; Boston, G. K. Hall & Co.; 1980.
- Cosmos (1933–1935). A serial novel with chapters written by various authors, including Campbell.

== Edited books ==
- From Unknown Worlds. New York: Street & Smith Publications, Inc., 1948; paperback.
- The Astounding Science Fiction Anthology. New York: Simon & Schuster, 1952; hardcover.
- The First Astounding Science Fiction Anthology. London: Grayson & Grayson Ltd., 1954; hardcover. See note below.
- The Second Astounding Science Fiction Anthology. London: Grayson & Grayson Ltd., 1954; hardcover.
- The Astounding Science Fiction Anthology. New York: Berkley Publishing Corp., 1956; paperback. See note below.
- Astounding Tales of Space and Time. New York: Berkley Publishing Corp., 1957; paperback. See note below.
- Prologue to Analog. Garden City: Doubleday & Company, Inc., 1962.
- Analog I. Garden City: Doubleday & Company, Inc., 1963; hardcover.
- Analog II. Garden City: Doubleday & Company, Inc., 1964; hardcover.
- The First Astounding Science Fiction Anthology. London: Four Square, 1964; paperback. See note below.
- The Second Astounding Science Fiction Anthology. London: Four Square, 1965; paperback. See note below.
- Analog 3. Garden City: Doubleday & Company, Inc., 1965; hardcover.
- Analog Anthology. London: Dennis Dobson, 1965; hardcover. Collects Prologue to Analog, Analog I, and Analog II.
- Analog 4. Garden City: Doubleday & Company, Inc., 1966; hardcover.
- Analog 5. Garden City: Doubleday & Company, Inc., 1967; hardcover.
- Selections From the Astounding Science Fiction Anthology. New York: Berkley Publishing Corporation, 1967. See note below.
- Analog 6. Garden City: Doubleday & Company, Inc., 1968; hardcover.
- Analog 7. Garden City: Doubleday & Company, Inc., 1969; hardcover.
- A World By the Tale. New York: Curtis Books, 1970; paperback. Retitling of Analog 3.
- The Permanent Implosion. New York: Curtis Books, 1970; paperback. Retitling of Analog 4.
- Countercommandment and Other Stories. New York: Curtis Books, 1970; paperback. Retitling of Analog 5.
- Analog 8. Garden City: Doubleday & Company, Inc., 1971; hardcover.

The situation with regard to The Astounding Science Fiction Anthology and its reprints is confusing enough to warrant a separate discussion. The original anthology, published by Simon & Schuster in 1952, contained 23 stories, and an introduction by Campbell. There have been three separate reissues of these stories in two volumes. The first was done by Grayson & Grayson, in 1954, as The First Astounding Science Fiction Anthology (seven stories) and The Second Science Fiction Anthology (eight stories). This selection omitted the introduction (as did all the later editions) and also omitted eight of the stories. Then in 1956 and 1957 Berkley issued two paperback selections. The first, with serial number G-41, had the same title as the original, 'The Astounding Science Fiction Anthology', but included only eight stories. This was re-released in 1967 under the title Selections From the Astounding Science Fiction Anthology. The second Berkley anthology, which had serial number G-47, was Astounding Tales of Space and Time; this selected another seven stories; again eight stories were omitted, although not the same eight as omitted by the Grayson books: Berkley included five stories not printed in the Grayson versions of the anthology, and omitted five that Grayson did print. Finally, in 1964 and 1965, Four Square printed a third version, again in two volumes, and with the same titles as the Grayson books: The First Astounding Science Fiction Anthology and The Second Astounding Science Fiction Anthology. The first volume contained eleven stories, and the second twelve stories; this version reprinted everything from the original 1952 one-volume edition except for Campbell's introduction.

== Nonfiction ==
- The Solar System, in Astounding, 1936–1937
- "Concerning Science Fiction," The Writer, May 1946.
- Collected Editorials from Analog. Garden City: Doubleday & Company, Inc., 1966; hardcover.
- The John W. Campbell Letters, Volume 1. Franklin, Tennessee: AC Projects, Inc., 1986; hardcover.
- The John W. Campbell Letters with Isaac Asimov & A. E. van Vogt, Volume II. Franklin, Tennessee: AC Projects, Inc., 1993; hardcover.
