= The Best of John W. Campbell =

Collected science fiction short stories

- Cover of first edition
- Author: John W. Campbell
- Cover artist: Simon Stern
- Language: English
- Genre: Science fiction
- Publisher: Sidgwick & Jackson
- Publication date: 1973
- Publication place: United Kingdom
- Media type: Print (paperback)
- Pages: 278
- ISBN: 0-283-97856-2
- Preceded by: The Best of C. L. Moore
- Followed by: The Best of C. M. Kornbluth

The Best of John W. Campbell is the title of two collections of science fiction short stories by American author John W. Campbell. The first, a British edition edited by George Hay, was first published in hardcover by Sidgwick & Jackson in February 1973, and in paperback by Sphere Books in November 1976. Sidgwick & Jackson later gathered together with The Far-Out Worlds of A. E. van Vogt (1968) into the omnibus volume Science Fiction Special 15 (1975), and with Brian N. Ball's Singularity Station (1973) and Poul Anderson's Orbit Unlimited (1961) into the omnibus volume Science Fiction Special 20 (1977). The second collection of this title, an American edition edited by Lester del Rey, was first published in hardcover by Nelson Doubleday in May 1976, and in paperback by Ballantine Books in June 1976 as a volume in its Classic Library of Science Fiction. The American edition was reprinted by Del Rey/Ballantine in February 1995, and has also been translated into German.

== Summary ==
The British edition contains five short works of fiction by the author, together with an introduction by James Blish. The American edition contains twelve short works of fiction by the author, together with an introduction by editor Lester del Rey and an afterword by the author's widow Mrs. John W. Campbell (Margaret Winter Campbell). The selection of stories varies between the two versions, though four of the five in the British title (all except for "The Double Minds") also appear in the American title.

== Contents (British edition) ==
- "Foreword" (James Blish)
- "The Double Minds" (from Thrilling Wonder Stories, Aug. 1937)
- "Forgetfulness" (from Astounding Stories, Jun. 1937)
- "Who Goes There?" (from Astounding Science-Fiction, Aug. 1938)
- "Out of Night" (from Astounding Stories, Oct. 1937)
- "Cloak of Aesir" (from Astounding Science-Fiction, Mar. 1939)

== Contents (American edition) ==
- "Introduction: The Three Careers of John W. Campbell" (Lester del Rey)
- "The Last Evolution" (from Amazing Stories, Aug. 1932)
- "Twilight" (from Astounding Stories, Nov. 1934)
- "The Machine" (from Astounding Stories, Feb. 1935)
- "The Invaders" (from Astounding Stories, Jun. 1935)
- "Rebellion" (from Astounding Stories, Aug. 1935)
- "Blindness" (from Astounding Stories, Mar. 1935)
- "Elimination" (from Astounding Stories, May 1936)
- "Forgetfulness" (from Astounding Stories, Jun. 1937)
- "Out of Night" (from Astounding Stories, Oct. 1937)
- "Cloak of Aesir" (from Astounding Science-Fiction, Mar. 1939)
- "Who Goes There?" (from Astounding Science-Fiction, Aug. 1938)
- "Space for Industry" [editorial] (from Astounding/Analog Science Fact & Fiction, Apr. 1960)
- "Postscriptum" [afterword] (Mrs. John W. Campbell)

== Reception ==
The British edition was reviewed by Van Ikin in SF Commentary #47, 1976, Steve Fahnestalk (1976) in New Venture #4, Summer 1976, anonymously in Reclams Science Fiction Führer, 1982, and by Stephen E. Andrews and Nick Rennison in 100 Must-Read Science Fiction Novels, 2006. The American edition was reviewed by Howard Waldrop in Delap's F & SF Review, August 1976, Lester del Rey in Analog Science Fiction/Science Fact November 1976, and Algis Budrys in The Magazine of Fantasy & Science Fiction, December 1976.

== Awards ==
The American edition placed twelfth in the 1977 Locus Poll Award for Best Single Author Collection. "Who Goes There?" won the 1939 Retro Hugo Award for Best Novella in 2014.
