= The Space Beyond =

First edition Cover art by Rick Sternbach

The Space Beyond is a collection of three previously unpublished science fiction novellas by John W. Campbell Jr., issued in 1976, five years after his death. It was published in paperback by Pyramid Books and was reprinted in 2011 and 2017.

The collection was compiled and edited by Roger Elwood, who learned of the stories' existence during a chance encounter with a friend of Campbell's. All three stories―one of which was once rewritten and expanded by Robert A. Heinlein as Sixth Column―survived only as typescript drafts prepared during the 1930s and are believed to have been written before Campbell became the editor of Astounding Stories.
