= The Best of C. L. Moore =

Collection of science fiction and fantasy short stories by C. L. Moore

- Cover of first edition
- Author: C. L. Moore
- Cover artist: Chet Jezierski
- Language: English
- Series: Ballantine's Classic Library of Science Fiction
- Genre: Science fiction
- Publisher: Doubleday
- Publication date: 1975
- Publication place: United States
- Media type: Print (hardcover)
- Pages: 309
- Preceded by: The Best of Cordwainer Smith
- Followed by: The Best of John W. Campbell

The Best of C. L. Moore is a collection of science fiction and fantasy short stories by American author C. L. Moore, edited by Lester del Rey. It was first published in hardback by Nelson Doubleday in November 1975 and in paperback by Ballantine Books in March 1976 as a volume in its Classic Library of Science Fiction. A second hardcover edition was issued by Taplinger in 1977, and the paperback edition was reissued by Del Rey/Ballantine in December 1980 and January 1981. The book has been translated into German and Italian.

== Summary ==
The book contains ten short works of fiction and an afterword by the author, together with an introduction by editor Lester del Rey.

== Contents ==
- "Forty Years of C. L. Moore" [introduction] (Lester del Rey)
- "Shambleau" [Northwest Smith] (from Weird Tales, Nov. 1933)
- "Black Thirst" [Northwest Smith] (from Weird Tales, Apr. 1934)
- "The Bright Illusion" (from Astounding Stories, Nov. 1934)
- "Black God's Kiss" [Jirel of Joiry] (from Weird Tales, Oct. 1934)
- "Tryst in Time" (from Astounding Stories, Dec. 1936)
- "Greater Than Gods" (from Astounding Science-Fiction, Jul. 1939)
- "Fruit of Knowledge" (from Unknown Fantasy Fiction, Oct. 1940)
- "No Woman Born" (from Astounding Science Fiction, Dec. 1944)
- "Daemon" (from Famous Fantastic Mysteries, Oct. 1946)
- "Vintage Season" (with Henry Kuttner) (from Astounding Science Fiction, Sep. 1946)
- "Afterword: Footnote to 'Shambleau'... and Others"

== Reception ==
The book was reviewed by Mary S. Weinkauf in Delap's F & SF Review, January 1976, with another, uncredited review appearing in Delap's F & SF Review, April 1976, and by Darrell Schweitzer in Science Fiction Review, February 1977.

== Awards ==
The book placed seventh in the 1976 Locus Poll Award for Best Single Author Collection.
