= The Astounding Science Fiction Anthology =

- Cover of first edition (hardcover)
- Editor: John W. Campbell Jr.
- Illustrator: Leo Manso
- Language: English
- Genre: Science fiction anthology
- Publisher: Simon & Schuster
- Publication date: 1952
- Publication place: United States
- Media type: Print (hardback & paperback)
- Pages: xv + 585
- OCLC: 798620

The Astounding Science Fiction Anthology is a selection of stories from Astounding Science Fiction, chosen by the magazine's longtime editor John W. Campbell Jr. It was originally published in hardcover in 1952 by Simon & Schuster, and reprinted in various forms and editions over the next two decades.

== Contents ==
- "Introduction", John W. Campbell Jr (1940)
- "Blowups Happen", Robert A. Heinlein, (1940)
- "Hindsight", Jack Williamson (1940)
- "Vault of the Beast", A. E. van Vogt (1940)
- "The Exalted", L. Sprague de Camp (1940)
- "Nightfall", Isaac Asimov (1941)
- "When the Bough Breaks," Henry Kuttner & C. L. Moore (1944)
- "Clash by Night", Henry Kuttner & C. L. Moore, (1943)
- "Invariant", John R. Pierce (1944)
- "First Contact", Murray Leinster (1945)
- "Meihem in ce Klasrum" (essay), W. K. Lessing (1946)
- "Hobbyist", Eric Frank Russell (1947)
- "E for Effort", T. L. Sherred (1947)
- "Child’s Play", William Tenn (1947)
- "Thunder and Roses", Theodore Sturgeon 1947
- "Late Night Final", Eric Frank Russell (1948)
- "Cold War", Kris Neville (1949)
- "Eternity Lost", Clifford D. Simak (1949)
- "The Witches of Karres", James H. Schmitz (1949)
- "Over the Top," Lester del Rey (1949)
- "Meteor", William T. Powers (1950)
- "Last Enemy", H. Beam Piper (1950)
- "Historical Note", Murray Leinster (1951)
- "Protected Species" H. B. Fyfe (1951)

"When The Bow Breaks" was published under the "Lewis Padgett" byline. "Clash By Night" was originally published under the "Lawrence O'Donnell" byline. "Meihem in ce Klasrum", a satirical piece, originally appeared under the "Dolton Edwards" pseudonym.

== Reception ==
P. Schuyler Miller, reviewing the anthology in Astounding itself, noted that "none of these stories are dated [but] read as well today as they did when first published." He concluded that while the stories are "not the best stories" from the magazine, but were selected by Campbell because they "make a dynamic response to the need for change."

== Publishing history and variant editions ==
Aside from a 1953 Science Fiction Book Club edition, the anthology has never been reprinted in its entirety. However, several abridged versions have been issued under various titles, as well as a pair of anthologies which together include all the stories from the original volume. The first abridged versions came from UK publisher Grayson & Grayson, in 1954, as The First Astounding Science Fiction Anthology (seven stories) and The Second Science Fiction Anthology (eight stories). Then in 1956 and 1957 Berkley Books issued two paperback selections. The first, with serial number G-41, had the same title as the original, 'The Astounding Science Fiction Anthology', but included only eight stories. This was re-released in 1967 under the title Selections From the Astounding Science Fiction Anthology. The second Berkley anthology, which had serial number G-47, was Astounding Tales of Space and Time; this selected another seven stories. Berkley included five stories not printed in the Grayson versions of the anthology, and omitted five that Grayson did print. Finally, in 1964 and 1965, Four Square printed a third version, again in two volumes, and with the same titles as the Grayson books: The First Astounding Science Fiction Anthology and The Second Astounding Science Fiction Anthology. The first volume contained eleven stories, and the second twelve stories; this version reprinted everything from the original 1952 one-volume edition except for Campbell's introduction.
