= Who Goes There? (collection) =

Short story collection by John W. Campbell

- Dust-jacket from the first edition
- Author: John W. Campbell Jr.
- Cover artist: Hannes Bok
- Language: English
- Genre: Science fiction
- Publisher: Shasta Publishers
- Publication date: 1948
- Publication place: United States
- Pages: 230
- OCLC: 2576424

Who Goes There? is a collection of science fiction stories by American writer John W. Campbell Jr. It was published in 1948 by Shasta Publishers in an edition of 3,000 copies, of which 200 were signed by Campbell. The 1951 film The Thing from Another World, and 1982 version The Thing by John Carpenter, are based on the title story. The stories originally appeared in the magazine Astounding SF under Campbell's pseudonym Don A. Stuart.

== Contents ==
- "Who Goes There?"
- "Blindness"
- "Frictional Losses"
- "Dead Knowledge"
- "Elimination"
- "Twilight"
- "Night"

== Reception ==
Astounding reviewer P. Schuyler Miller praised the stories as providing "powerful and lasting stimulation to the imagination."

== Sources ==
- Chalker, Jack L.; Mark Owings (1998). The Science-Fantasy Publishers: A Bibliographic History, 1923-1998. Westminster, MD and Baltimore: Mirage Press, Ltd. p. 592.
- Contento, William G. "Index to Science Fiction Anthologies and Collections". Archived from the original on 2019-06-10.
- Tuck, Donald H. (1974). The Encyclopedia of Science Fiction and Fantasy. Chicago: Advent. p. 88. ISBN 0-911682-20-1.
