= Sixth Column =

1941 SF novel by Robert A. Heinlein

- First edition cover.
- Author: Robert A. Heinlein (based on a story by John W. Campbell)
- Cover artist: Edd Cartier
- Language: English
- Genre: Science fiction
- Publisher: Gnome Press
- Publication date: 1949
- Publication place: United States
- Media type: Print (Hardcover & Paperback)
- Pages: 256

Sixth Column, also known under the title The Day After Tomorrow, is a science fiction novel by American writer Robert A. Heinlein, based on a then-unpublished story by editor John W. Campbell, and set in a United States that has been conquered by the PanAsians, who are asserted to be neither Japanese nor Chinese. Originally published as a serial in Astounding Science Fiction (January, February, and March 1941, using the pen name Anson MacDonald) it was published in hardcover in 1949. It is most known for its race-based premise.

== Plot summary ==
A top secret research facility hidden in the Colorado mountains is the last remaining outpost of the United States Army after its defeat by the PanAsians. The conquerors had absorbed the Soviets after being attacked by them and had then gone on to absorb India as well. The invaders are ruthless and cruel. As an example, they crush an abortive rebellion by killing 150,000 American civilians as punishment. Noting that the invaders have allowed the free practice of religion (the better to pacify their slaves), the Americans set up their own church in order to build a resistance movement – a "sixth column", as opposed to a traitorous fifth column.

The laboratory is in turmoil as the novel begins. All but six of the personnel have died suddenly, due to unknown forces released by an experiment operating within the newly discovered magneto-gravitic or electro-gravitic spectra. The surviving scientists soon learn that they can selectively kill people by releasing the internal pressure of their cell membranes, among other things. Using this discovery, they construct a race-selective weapon that will stun or kill only Asians.

== Background ==
The idea for the story of Sixth Column was proposed by John W. Campbell, who had written a similar unpublished story called "All" (it would eventually be published in the anthology The Space Beyond). Heinlein would later write that he "had to reslant it to remove racist aspects of the original story line" and he also wrote that he did not "consider it to be an artistic success."

Heinlein's work on Campbell's "All" was considerably more than just a re-slanting; Campbell's story was felt to be unpublishable as it stood, written in a pseudo-archaic dialect (sometimes inconsistently), and provided no scientific explanations for miraculous powers of the American super-weapons, which the PanAsians have no explanation for other than to conclude that weapons' powers must be divine. Science fiction writer-critic George Zebrowski believed that Heinlein intended the novel's Calhoun, who, after going insane, believes the false religion created by the Americans, as a parody of Campbell himself. The bulk of Heinlein's work on the novel, e.g. the explanations of the weapons' effectiveness and the strategy for the Americans' rebellion, is not present in "All".

== Reception ==
Boucher and McComas found the novel to be "a fine example of serious pulp science fiction." P. Schuyler Miller compared Sixth Column to "the old E. Phillips Oppenheim or modern Eric Ambler intrigue, thrust and counterthrust with civilization at stake."

== Portrayal of racism ==
The book was serialized in early 1941, at a time that the Second Sino-Japanese War was in its fourth year and large parts of China had been occupied in brutal fashion by the Japanese. The book is notable for its frank portrayal of racism on both sides. The conquerors regard themselves as a chosen people predestined to rule over lesser races, and they refer to white people as slaves. "Three things only do slaves require: work, food, and their religion." They demand outward signs of respect, such as jumping promptly into the gutter when a member of the chosen race walks by, and the slightest hesitation to show the prescribed courtesies earns a swagger stick across the face. One character is Frank Mitsui, an Asian American whose family was murdered by the invaders because they did not fit in the new PanAsiatic racial order. The Americans in the novel respond to their conquerors' racism by often referring to them in unflattering terms, such as "flat face" and "slanty".

== See also ==
- Invasion literature
- Yellow Peril
