= Cloak of Aesir =

Book by John W. Campbell

- Dust-jacket from the first edition
- Author: John W. Campbell, Jr.
- Cover artist: Malcolm Smith
- Language: English
- Genre: Science fiction
- Publisher: Shasta Publishers
- Publication date: 1952
- Publication place: United States
- Media type: Print (hardback)
- Pages: 254
- OCLC: 1136776

Cloak of Aesir is a collection of science fiction stories by American writer John W. Campbell, Jr. It was published in 1952 by Shasta Publishers in an edition of 5,000 copies. The stories originally appeared in the magazine Astounding SF under Campbell's pseudonym Don A. Stuart.

== Contents ==
- Introduction
- "Forgetfulness"
- "The Escape"
- "The Machine"
- "The Invaders"
- "Rebellion"
- "Out of Night"
- "Cloak of Aesir"

Six of the seven stories were later included in the 1976 collection The Best of John W. Campbell (Ballantine/Del Rey).

== Reception ==
Writing in The New York Times, J. Francis McComas "warmly recommended" Cloak of Aesir, noting that "none of these stories follows its chosen path to an expected destination." Groff Conklin characterized the collection as "somewhat overwritten, but still well done." Boucher and McComas, however, praised Cloak for the stories' "amazing modernity of concept and extrapolation [and their] rarely achieved combination of original thinking and high adventure.". P. Schuyler Miller praised the collection as "all top-notch idea-stories . . . laying the foundations of the more adult stuff we know today."

== Sources ==
- Chalker, Jack L.; Mark Owings (1998). The Science-Fantasy Publishers: A Bibliographic History, 1923-1998. Westminster, MD and Baltimore: Mirage Press, Ltd. p. 593.
- Contento, William G. "Index to Science Fiction Anthologies and Collections". Archived from the original on 2019-06-10.
- Tuck, Donald H. (1974). The Encyclopedia of Science Fiction and Fantasy. Chicago: Advent. p. 87. ISBN 0-911682-20-1.
