= Trevor Quachri =

American magazine editor

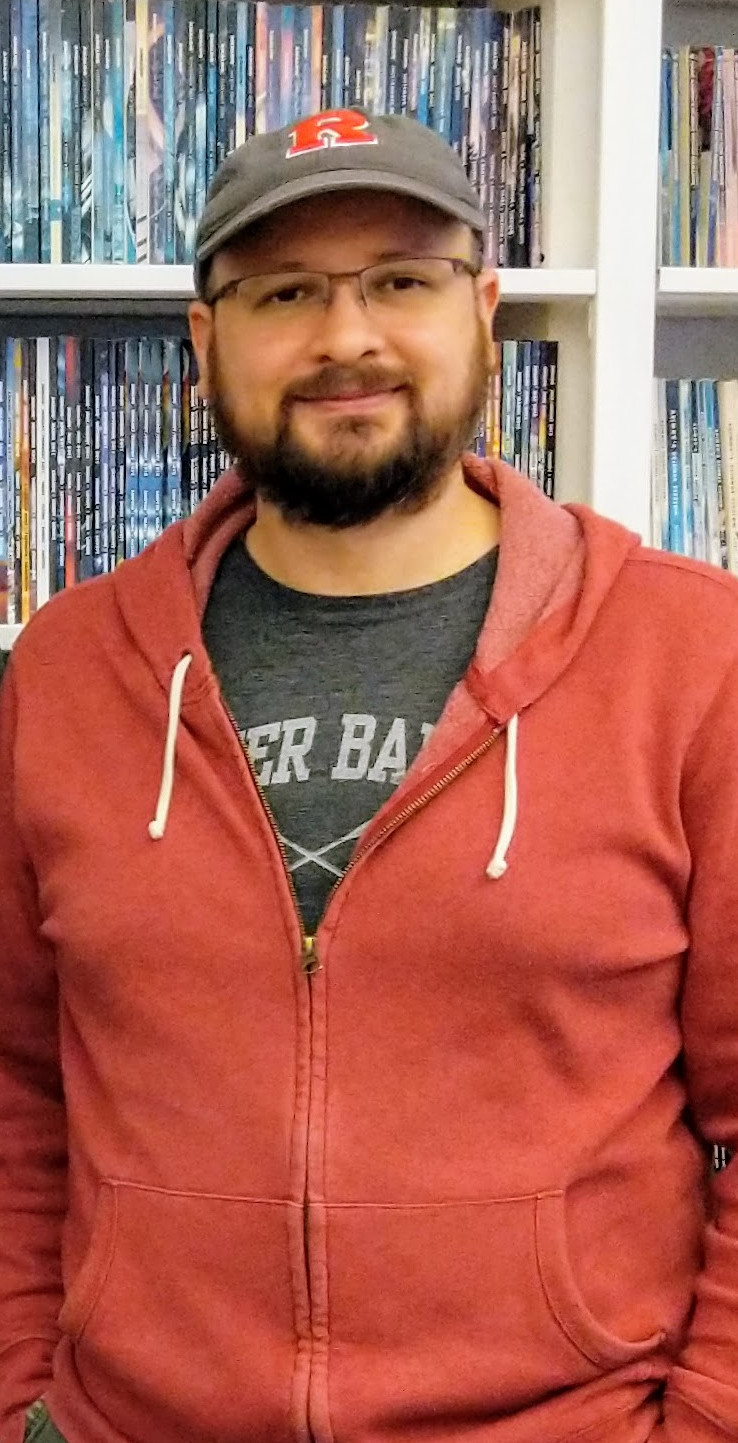
Trevor Quachri at Dell Magazine offices

Trevor Quachri (/ˈkæʃriː/, born 1976) has been the sixth editor of Analog Science Fiction and Fact magazine since September 2012.

Previously, he was “a Broadway stagehand, collected data for museums, and executive produced a science fiction pilot for a basic cable channel.”

Quachri started as an editorial assistant in 1999 at Asimov's Science Fiction and Analog. Former editor of Analog, Ben Bova, was an early influence. Bova’s Orion books were some of the first science fiction that Quachri read, followed by back issues of OMNI Magazine, and then Analog.

He lives in New Jersey, with his wife and daughter.

== Bibliography ==
- "Checklists". Editorial. Analog Science Fiction and Fact. 134 (1–2): 4–6. January–February 2014.
- "These are not the drones you're looking for". Editorial. Analog Science Fiction and Fact. 134 (9): 4–6. September 2014.
- "Pulp friction". Editorial. Analog Science Fiction and Fact. 135 (6): 4–5. June 2015.
