= The Incredible Planet =

1949 science fiction fix-up novel by John W. Campbell, Jr.

- Dust-jacket from the first edition
- Author: John W. Campbell, Jr.
- Cover artist: A. J. Donnell
- Language: English
- Genre: Science fiction
- Publisher: Fantasy Press
- Publication date: 1949
- Publication place: United States
- Media type: Print (hardback)
- Pages: 344
- OCLC: 1462253
- Preceded by: The Mightiest Machine

The Incredible Planet is a science fiction fix-up novel by American author John W. Campbell, Jr. It was published in 1949 by Fantasy Press in an edition of 3,998 copies. The novel is a collection of three linked novelettes that were not accepted for the magazine Astounding SF. The stories are sequels to Campbell's 1934 novel The Mightiest Machine.

== Contents ==
- "The Incredible Planet"
- "The Interstellar Search"
- "The Infinite Atom"

== Reception ==
Astounding reviewer P. Schuyler Miller found "The Incredible Planet" "a kind of bridge to the Don A. Stuart style which writer-editor Campbell [had been] developing." Everett F. Bleiler thought the sequels "lack the strengths, such as they are, of The Mightiest Machine."

== Sources ==
- Contento, William G. "Index to Science Fiction Anthologies and Collections".
- Chalker, Jack L.; Mark Owings (1998). The Science-Fantasy Publishers: A Bibliographic History, 1923-1998. Westminster, MD and Baltimore: Mirage Press, Ltd. pp. 236–237.
- Tuck, Donald H. (1974). The Encyclopedia of Science Fiction and Fantasy. Chicago: Advent. p. 87. ISBN 0-911682-20-1.
