= Islands of Space =

1931/1957 science fiction novel by John W. Campbell Jr.

- Dust-jacket from the first edition
- Author: John W. Campbell Jr.
- Cover artist: Ric Binkley
- Language: English
- Series: Arcot, Morey and Wade
- Genre: Science fiction
- Publisher: Fantasy Press
- Publication date: 1931 (expanded, 1957)
- Publication place: United States
- Media type: Print (Hardback)
- Pages: 224
- OCLC: 3613703
- Preceded by: The Black Star Passes
- Followed by: Invaders from the Infinite

Islands of Space is a science fiction novel by American writer John W. Campbell It was first published in book form in 1957 by Fantasy Press in an edition of 1,417 copies. The novel originally appeared in the magazine Amazing Stories Quarterly in Spring 1931; the text was "extensively edited" for book publication, with Campbell's approval, by Lloyd Arthur Eshbach. A paperback edition was published by Ace Books in 1966. In 1973, Islands was included in a Doubleday omnibus of all three "Arcot, Wade, and Morey" novels. A German translation appeared in 1967 as Kosmische Kreuzfahrt, and an Italian translation was published in 1976 as Isole nello spazio.

The original 1931 version of Islands of Space is generally credited with introducing the concepts of hyperspace and the warp drive to science fiction.

== Plot introduction ==
Islands of Space is a sequel to The Black Star Passes. It concerns the adventures of four heroes: Arcot, Morey, Wade, and Fuller. It is followed by Invaders from the Infinite.

== Reception ==
Theodore Sturgeon, reviewing the Fantasy Press edition, wrote "This is a real lousy book", faulting its lack of characterization, suspense, and plot, and a writing style "such as would dry up the purple blood of the sleaziest fan magazine". "BUT --", he continued, "Islands is a voyage far afield and a catalogue of the marvels of other-where, ... a cornucopia of technological and mechanistic matter, both real and extrapolated, poured out prodigiously and with abandon, [and] a narrative which could not occur without its science -- the purest, and almost the rarest form of science fiction." Sturgeon concluded, "It is high time and past time for [science fiction] to infuse itself with the rich hot blood of the old space-opera".

P. Schuyler Miller wrote that the book version "has been carefully modernized, [but] it's old-fashioned now. It is also very characteristic of the best "hard" science fiction of its day." This is the first published use of the term hard science fiction.

E. F. Bleiler described the original text as "Greatly overloaded with unnecessary (although at times ingenious) exposition, hence almost unreadable; weak novelistically; and clichéd in its action plot."

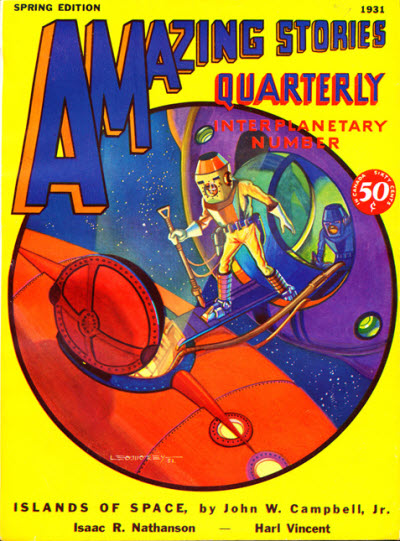
Islands of Space was originally published in the Spring 1931 Amazing Stories Quarterly

== Sources ==
- Chalker, Jack L.; Mark Owings (1998). The Science-Fantasy Publishers: A Bibliographic History, 1923-1998. Westminster, MD and Baltimore: Mirage Press, Ltd. p. 240.
- Tuck, Donald H. (1974). The Encyclopedia of Science Fiction and Fantasy. Chicago: Advent. pp. 87–88. ISBN 0-911682-20-1.
