= Twilight (short story) =

1934 science fiction short story by John W. Campbell

- Short story by John W. Campbell
- Country: United States
- Language: English
- Genre: Science fiction

Publication
- Published in: Astounding Stories, The Science Fiction Hall of Fame, Volume One, 1929–1964
- Publication type: Literary magazine
- Media type: Print (magazine), book
- Publication date: 1934

"Twilight" is a science fiction short story by American author John W. Campbell. It was originally published in 1934 in Astounding Stories and apparently inspired by H. G. Wells' article The Man of the Year Million. In 1970, it was selected as one of the best science fiction short stories published before the creation of the Nebula Awards by the Science Fiction Writers of America. As such, it was published in The Science Fiction Hall of Fame Volume One, 1929–1964.

Set in 1932 in an unnamed small town in the Nevada, the narrator introduces Jim Bendell who recounts his experience with a strange and mysterious hitch-hiker claiming to be a time traveler from the year of 3059 who has traveled far into the future. In seven million years time, machines do everything for human beings, and people eventually lose touch with their human experience and regress both socially and intellectually as a species. They become apathetic, and the population dwindles toward extinction.

== Background ==
Campbell developed "Twilight" during his period living in North Carolina. Hugo Gernsback had recently rejected a story Campbell submitted entitled "Space Rays", and he had become more focused on tone after reading Charles Elbert Scoggins' novel The Red Gods Call. Campbell scholar Alec Nevala-Lee wrote that the result was "like nothing else Campbell had ever written", save for the opening to The Black Star Passes, but Nevala-Lee emphasises the crucial difference that the opening of The Black Star Passes describes aliens, while Twilight is about humans.

Campbell worked on the story for longer than he usually did, but it was repeatedly turned down by publishers. It would only be when F. Orlin Tremaine reached out to Campbell for his magazine Astounding that it would be published. Tremaine enjoyed the short story, but thought it might confuse readers if published alongside The Mightiest Machine; the latter story was significantly less unique for Campbell; and so Tremaine and Campbell settled on publishing it under the pseudonym Don A. Stuart. Stories published as Stuart would quickly become popular among readers.

== Plot summary ==
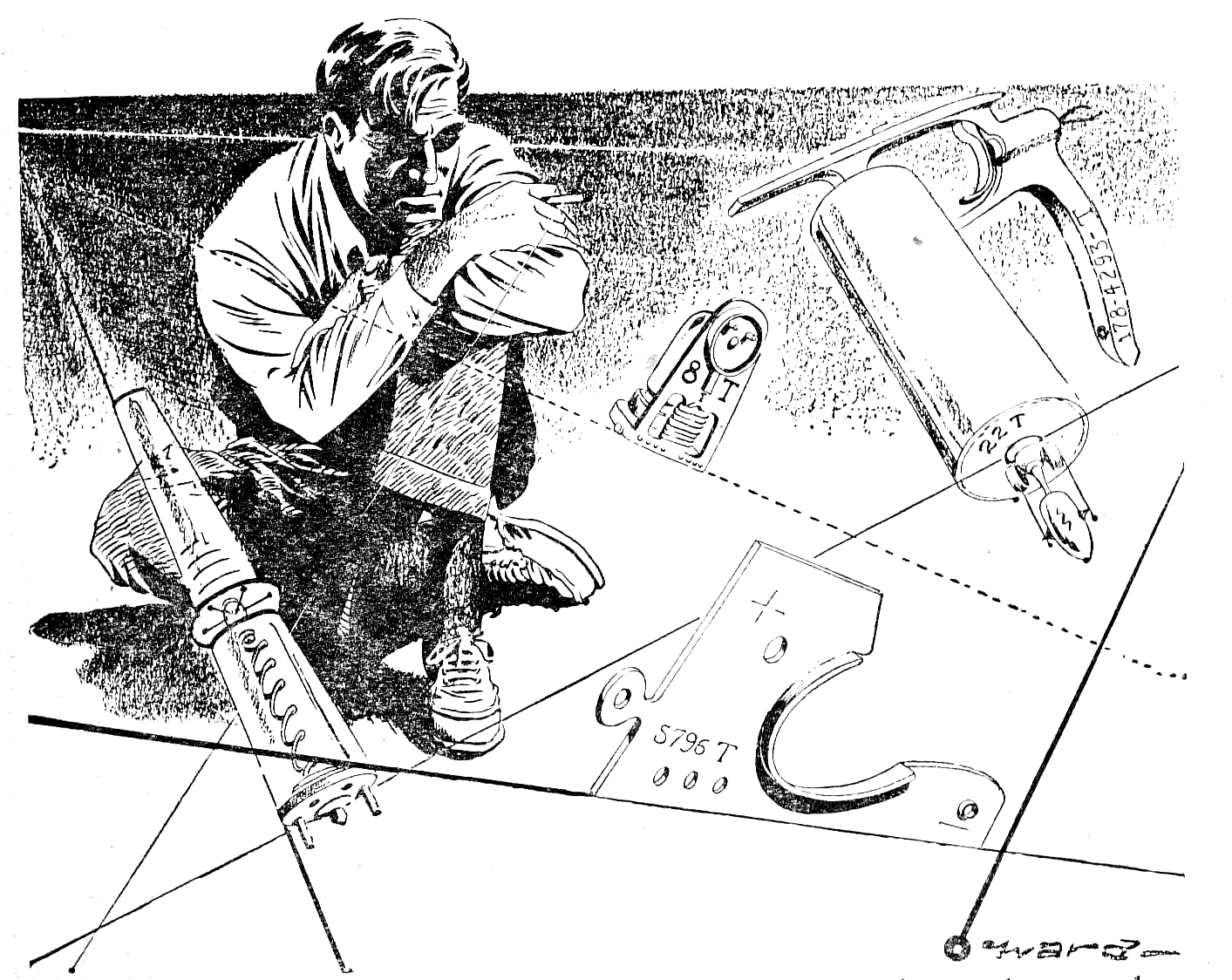
Illustrator Ward, Astounding Science Fiction (1950-01)

On December 9, 1932 Jim Bendell, a real estate business man, picks up a hitch-hiker. The hitch-hiker introduces himself as Ares Sen Kenlin, a scientist from the year 3059. Kenlin reveals to Benell that he is a human hybrid, created by his father, who is also a scientist. Kenlin explains he has developed time-travel technology and went seven million years forward in time, but overshot, travelling backwards in time to 1932.

During their car ride together, Kenlin begins to describe in great detail what he saw during his trip forward. He tells Bendell that the people of Earth eventually colonize the Solar System, human existence is virtually free of difficulty, and all illness and predators have been eliminated. On Earth, all work is performed by perfectly designed machines.

All other species have been driven into extinction by the advancements of man. The oceans are empty of life, all mammals as well as birds, lizards, insects, microbes, and pets have been completely eradicated, except for dogs. Humans, though highly intelligent, have lost their curiosity and drive. Not having accomplished anything new in two million years, humans have become trapped in their self-satisfied developments; they do not see they have become sterile and uninspired. They are a dying race who retreat from their conquest of the Solar System and return to Earth. Kenlin describes the massive cities of the future such as "Yawk City", a megalopolis stretching from north of Boston to south of Washington D.C.. The long-deserted cities are kept running perfectly by machines, for nobody remembers how to make them stop or even care.

People are unable to reproduce as before, the human gestational process decreases to one month to birth offspring. Life expectancy increases to 3000 years, though people continue to grow lonelier and more disconnected from life. Ease has dulled their awareness, leaving them unchallenged and accustomed to making little or no effort.

Kenlin discovers a group of highly intelligent machines capable of independent thought. They had been left shut off, abandoned and forgotten. He feels it is his responsibility as a scientist to attempt to try to release Earth from its stagnation. He activates one of the machines and gives it the task to create another, one that possesses the curiosity human beings have lost.

== Critical reception ==
Author Isaac Asimov, as a fan of Astounding before he was a writer, disliked Twilight, and wrote to the editor criticising it.

Science fiction author Algis Budrys said of "Twilight" that it "attracted a decade-long series of engineers/mystics as the archetypal writers of the 'Golden Age' and brought about the late Victorian Edwardian flavor of "Modern' science fiction".

Everett F. Bleiler concluded that "Twilight" is "probably Campbell's best story, with many implications beyond the story level".
