= The Moon Is Hell! =

1951 collection of two stories by John W. Campbell Jr.

- Dust-jacket from the first edition
- Author: John W. Campbell Jr.
- Cover artist: Hannes Bok
- Language: English
- Genre: Science fiction
- Publisher: Fantasy Press
- Publication date: 1951
- Publication place: United States
- Media type: Print (hardback)
- Pages: 256 pp
- OCLC: 1453762

The Moon Is Hell! is a collection of two stories, one science fiction, the other sword and sorcery, by American writer John W. Campbell Jr. It was published in 1951 by Fantasy Press in an edition of 4,206 copies. The title story, published for the first time in this collection, deals with a team of scientists stranded on the Moon when their spacecraft crashes, and how they use their combined skills and knowledge to survive until rescue, including building shelter from meteor showers, and creating their own oxygen from Lunar rock. The second story, "The Elder Gods", Campbell rewrote, on a short deadline, from a story by Arthur J. Burks purchased for Unknown but later deemed unsatisfactory. It originally appeared in the October 1939 issue of Unknown under the pseudonym Don A. Stuart. The title of the eponymous story is occasionally found without the exclamation point, but the punctuation is used for the title of most editions of the collection itself.

== Reception ==
Reviewer Groff Conklin noted that while "The Elder Gods" was "actually not among the best of Campbell's work", the title story, original to the collection, was "a brilliantly circumstantial narrative [and] "first-rate stuff". Anthony Boucher and J. Francis McComas praised the title piece as "an extraordinary short novel ... with Defoe's own dry convincing factuality". P. Schuyler Miller received the volume favorably, describing the title piece as "a realistic story of the first men on another world, worked out with an absolute minimum of hokum". Everett F. Bleiler found "The Elder Gods" to be "contrived, derivative, and dull". Lester del Rey, however, found "The Elder Gods" to be "a fine sword-and-sorcery novel, having some of the magic of A. Merritt but a lot more logic in its development". New York Times reviewer Basil Davenport praised both stories, the title piece for its "close attention to scientific accuracy", the second as "pure swashbuckling romance".

== Contents ==
- "The Moon Is Hell"
- "The Elder Gods"

== Sources ==
- Chalker, Jack L.; Mark Owings (1998). The Science-Fantasy Publishers: A Bibliographic History, 1923-1998. Westminster, MD and Baltimore: Mirage Press, Ltd. pp. 237–238.
- Contento, William G. "Index to Science Fiction Anthologies and Collections".
- Tuck, Donald H. (1974). The Encyclopedia of Science Fiction and Fantasy. Chicago: Advent. p. 88. ISBN 0-911682-20-1.
