= Invaders from the Infinite =

1961 science fiction novel by John W. Campbell Jr.

- Dust-jacket from the Gnome Press edition
- Author: John W. Campbell Jr.
- Cover artist: W.I. Van der Poel, Jr. (Gnome Press); Lloyd Eshbach and Ric Binkley (Fantasy Press)
- Language: English
- Series: Arcot, Morey and Wade
- Genre: Science fiction
- Publisher: Gnome Press and Fantasy Press
- Publication date: 1961
- Publication place: United States
- Media type: Print (Hardback)
- Pages: 189
- OCLC: 1455127
- Preceded by: Islands of Space

Invaders from the Infinite is a science fiction novel by American writer John W. Campbell Jr. It was simultaneously published in 1961 by Gnome Press in an edition of 4,000 copies and by Fantasy Press in an edition of 100 copies. The book was originally intended to be published by Fantasy Press, but was handed over to Gnome Press when Fantasy Press folded. Lloyd Eshbach, of Fantasy Press, who was responsible for the printing of both editions, printed the extra copies for his longtime customers. The Fantasy Press edition was issued without a dust-jacket. Eshbach eventually did produce a jacket in 1990 at the urging of George Zebrowski. The novel is an expansion of stories that originally appeared in the magazine Amazing Stories Quarterly.

E. F. Bleiler described the novel as "the early John W. Campbell story par excellence: weak novelistic skills combined with very strong speculative, imaginative theoretical physics. While one may be bored with [the] interminable lectures and rendered drowsy by the repeated space battles, but one must also admire Campbell's ingenuity in creating novel artifacts".

== Plot introduction ==
The novel, a sequel to The Black Star Passes and Islands of Space, concerns a trio of heroes, Arcot, Morey and Wade, and their attempts to help a race of superdogs.

1990 dust-jacket by Lloyd Eshbach and Ric Binkley for the Fantasy Press edition

== Sources ==
- Chalker, Jack L.; Mark Owings (1998). The Science-Fantasy Publishers: A Bibliographic History, 1923-1998. Westminster, MD and Baltimore: Mirage Press, Ltd. pp. 240–241, 308.
- Tuck, Donald H. (1974). The Encyclopedia of Science Fiction and Fantasy. Chicago: Advent. pp. 87–88. ISBN 0-911682-20-1.
