= The Black Star Passes =

1953 fixup of science fiction short stories by John W. Campbell Jr.

- Dust-jacket from the first edition
- Author: John W. Campbell Jr.
- Cover artist: Ric Binkley
- Language: English
- Series: Arcot, Morey and Wade
- Genre: Science fiction
- Publisher: Fantasy Press
- Publication date: 1953
- Publication place: United States
- Media type: Print (hardback)
- Pages: 254
- OCLC: 1138567
- Followed by: Islands of Space

The Black Star Passes is a fixup of science fiction short stories by American author John W. Campbell Jr. It was first published in 1953 by Fantasy Press in an edition of 2,951 copies. The book is the first in Campbell's Arcot, Morey and Wade series, and is followed by the novels Islands of Space and Invaders from the Infinite. The stories originally appeared in the magazines Amazing Stories and Amazing Stories Quarterly, and were "extensively edited" for book publication, with Campbell's approval, by Lloyd Arthur Eshbach.

Galaxy reviewer Groff Conklin described the stories as "three creaking classics . . . fun to read, [but] rococo antiques [without] believable characters, human relations, even logical plots." Boucher and McComas dismissed the book as "a hopelessly outdated set of novelets . . . of concern only to those who wish to observe the awkward larval stage of a major figure in science fiction." P. Schuyler Miller described the stories as "old-fashioned fun which [Campbell] no longer takes any more seriously than you need to."

The anthology has been described as representing a more "mainline" (classic science-fiction) treatment of Venus, compared to the planetary romance genre, in which it featured prominently at that time.

== Contents ==
- Introduction
- "Piracy Preferred"
- "Solarite"
- "The Black Star Passes"

== Sources ==
- Chalker, Jack L.; Mark Owings (1998). The Science-Fantasy Publishers: A Bibliographic History, 1923-1998. Westminster, MD and Baltimore: Mirage Press, Ltd. p. 239.
- Contento, William G. "Index to Science Fiction Anthologies and Collections". Archived from the original on 2019-06-10.
- Tuck, Donald H. (1974). The Encyclopedia of Science Fiction and Fantasy. Chicago: Advent. p. 87. ISBN 0-911682-20-1.
