= The Mightiest Machine =

1947 science fiction novel by John W. Campbell, Jr.

- Dust-jacket from the first edition
- Author: John W. Campbell, Jr.
- Illustrator: R. Pailthorpe
- Cover artist: Betty Wells Halladay
- Language: English
- Genre: Science fiction
- Publisher: The Hadley Publishing Co.
- Publication date: 1947
- Publication place: United States
- Media type: Print (Hardback)
- Pages: 228
- OCLC: 2737057
- Followed by: The Incredible Planet

The Mightiest Machine is a science fiction novel by American writer John W. Campbell, Jr. The novel was originally serialized in 5 parts in Astounding Stories magazine from December 1934 to April 1935, and was published in book form in 1947 by The Hadley Publishing Co. in an edition of 1,200 copies. Campbell was a leading figure in the Golden Age of Science Fiction. Its sequel, The Incredible Planet, is a fix-up novel, also by Campbell, published in 1949. The book collects three interconnected novelettes: The Incredible Planet, The Interstellar Search, and The Infinite Atom.

== Plot introduction ==
The story is the first to feature Campbell's hero Aarn Munro, a genius physicist born on Jupiter, where the high gravity endowed him with exceptional strength. This space opera novel concerns the harnessing of energy from the sun and encounters with aliens who turn out not to be truly alien at all. It also touches on the legends of ancient civilizations on earth, Mu in this case, and what may have happened to them.

== Reception ==
Astounding reviewer P. Schuyler Miller described the 1947 edition as "perhaps the climax of the super-physics school of science fiction which 'Skylark' Smith had started." Everett F. Bleiler identified the novel as the paradigm of "the Campbell hard space opera," noting its "great quantity of fanciful and ingenious scientific extrapolations, fictional weaknesses, and polarized social simplistics that regard genocide with equanimity."

== Technology ==
The novel is ground breaking in its inclusion of a wide range of advanced technology including space travel concepts such as artificial gravity, faster-than-light travel with warp drive, and an early version of travel through wormholes as important facets of the story. The protagonist also invents and employs devices such as night vision goggles and miniature remotely piloted surveillance drones.

== Adaptation ==
=== Street and Smith ===
Aarn Murno was renamed as Iron Munro in Shadow Comics #1 in 1940, published by Street and Smith, the same publisher behind Astounding Stories.

In this version, set in the distant future of 2093 AD, a colonization expedition to Ganymede becomes stranded after their ship is caught in Jupiter’s immense gravitational field. Unable to escape, the crew settles on the inhospitable moon. There, a child is born and raised under high-gravity, this child becomes Iron Munro, a space-born hero of immense strength and agility, who eventually makes his way to Earth to fight evil.

=== DC Comics ===
In 1987, Roy Thomas reimagined the character for DC Comics as part of the Young All-Stars, following the events of Crisis on Infinite Earths. Now spelled Arn Munro, he was reintroduced not as a space hero but as the son of Hugo Danner, the protagonist of Philip Wylie’s 1930 novel Gladiator,a work widely regarded as a precursor to Superman.

In this post-Crisis continuity, Hugo Danner fakes his death after a life of isolation and pain caused by his superhuman abilities. He briefly returns to Colorado, where he fathers a child, Arn, with his former love Anna Blake. Raised in secret and aware of his powers, Arn promises to keep them hidden until adulthood. As a teenager, he earns the nickname “Iron ” while playing baseball and eventually joins the Young All-Stars during World War II as Iron Munro.

== Trivia ==
The novel contains the phrase "…to infinity and beyond…": "Her crew on that trip that was to lead them to infinity and beyond consisted of Aarn Munro, Carlisle,…"

== Sources ==
- "nooSFere". Archived from the original on February 14, 2007.
- Chalker, Jack L.; Mark Owings (1998). The Science-Fantasy Publishers: A Bibliographic History, 1923-1998. Westminster, MD and Baltimore: Mirage Press, Ltd. p. 343.
- Tuck, Donald H. (1974). The Encyclopedia of Science Fiction and Fantasy. Chicago: Advent. p. 88. ISBN 0-911682-20-1.
