= Fantasy Publishing Company, Inc. =

Defunct American small press

- Founded: 1946; 79 years ago
- Founder: William L. Crawford
- Defunct: 1972; 53 years ago
- Country of origin: United States
- Fiction genres: Science fiction, fantasy

Fantasy Publishing Company, Inc., or FPCI, was an American science fiction and fantasy small press specialty publishing company established in 1946. It was the fourth small press company founded by William L. Crawford.

Crawford's first company was Fantasy Publications which he started in 1935 in Everett, Pennsylvania, primarily to publish his magazines Marvel Tales and Unusual Stories. However, three books were published under the imprint.

In 1936, Crawford initiated his second company, Visionary Publishing Company, with the intention of publishing books with this imprint. Visionary is notable for publishing the only hardcover book by H. P. Lovecraft that was published during his lifetime.

Later in 1936, Crawford assumed management of publication of Fantasy Magazine from Conrad H. Ruppert and ceased all book publications in order to concentrate on the magazine. After relocating to California, Crawford again published books as "A Crawford Publication".

Finally, he incorporated as Fantasy Publishing Company, Inc. in December 1946. Forrest J. Ackerman served as a partner for the company and many of the books published by FPCI were from authors Ackerman represented as agent. Undercapitalization was a major problem with FPCI and many of the books had a cheap look. FPCI reprinted a number of novels by John Taine, Ralph Milne Farley, Stanton Coblentz and L. Ron Hubbard. FPCI continued publishing books until 1972.

During this period, Crawford also used the Griffin Publishing Company to publish books which were not science fiction or fantasy. Two additional books were published by Crawford in 1978, but a publisher was not cited.

== Books published by Fantasy Publications ==
- Men of Avalon / The White Sybil, by David H. Keller and Clark Ashton Smith (1935)
- Mars Mountain, by Eugene George Key (1935)

== Books published by Visionary Publishing Company ==
- The Shadow Over Innsmouth, by H. P. Lovecraft (1936)
- Behind the Evidence, by Peter Reynolds, pseudonym of Amelia Reynolds Long and William L. Crawford (1936)

== Books published as A Crawford Publication ==
- The Garden of Fear and Other Stories, edited by William L. Crawford (1945)
- The Creator, by Clifford D. Simak (1946)

== Books published by FPCI ==
- The Night People, by Francis Flagg (1947)
- Out of the Unknown, by A. E. van Vogt and E. Mayne Hull (1948)
- The Sunken World, by Stanton A. Coblentz (1948)
- Death's Deputy, by L. Ron Hubbard (1948)
- The Radio Man, by Ralph Milne Farley (1948)
- The Works of M. P. Shiel, by A. Reynolds Morse (1948)
- The Cosmic Geoids and One Other, by John Taine (1949)
- The Kingslayer, by L. Ron Hubbard (1949)
- Planets of Adventure, by Basil Wells (1949)
- Murder Madness, by Murray Leinster (1949)
- The Radium Pool, by Ed Earl Repp (1949)
- Triton, by L. Ron Hubbard (1949)
- Worlds of Wonder, by Olaf Stapledon (1949)
- The Stellar Missiles, by Ed Earl Repp (1949)
- The Rat Race, by Jay Franklin (1950)
- After 12,000 Years, by Stanton A. Coblentz (1950)
- The Omnibus of Time, by Ralph Milne Farley (1950)
- The Dark Other, by Stanley G. Weinbaum (1950)
- The Hidden Universe, by Ralph Milne Farley (1950)
- The Undesired Princess, by L. Sprague de Camp (1951)
- The Toymaker, by Raymond F. Jones (1951)
- Doorways to Space, by Basil Wells (1951)
- The Iron Star, by John Taine (1951)
- The Atom Clock, by Cornel Lengyel (1951)
- Drome, by John Martin Leahy (1952)
- Green Fire, by John Taine (1952)
- The Planet of Youth, by Stanton A. Coblentz (1952)
- Max Brand: The Man and His Work, by Darrell C. Richardson (1952)
- Science-Fantasy Quintette, by Ed Earl Repp and L. Ron Hubbard (1953)
- From Death to the Stars, by L. Ron Hubbard (1953)
- Fantasy Twin, by L. Sprague de Camp and Stanley G. Weinbaum (1953)
- Quadratic, by Olaf Stapledon and Murray Leinster (1953)
- Strange Worlds, by Ralph Milne Farley (1953)
- Science and Sorcery, edited by Garret Ford (1953)
- Stardrift and Other Fantastic Flotsam, by Emil Petaja (1971)
- Atlantean Chronicles, by Henry M. Eichner (1971)
- Garan the Eternal, by Andre Norton (1972)

== Books published by Griffin Publishing Company ==
- Griffin Science-Fantasy Booklet Number One, edited by William L. Crawford (1947)
- People of the Comet, by Austin Hall (1948)
- The Machine God Laughs, edited by William L. Crawford (1949)
- The Hypnotism Handbook, by Charles Edward Cooke and A. E. van Vogt (1956) (The second edition with the Wehman Bros. is the first Griffin edition.)

== Books published by William L. Crawford without imprint ==
- The Moon Maiden, by Garrett P. Serviss (1978)
- Index to Fantasy and Science Fiction in Munsey Publications (1978)
