= Science and Sorcery =

1953 anthology of fantasy and science fiction stories edited by Garret Ford

- Cover of the first edition
- Author: edited by Garret Ford
- Illustrator: Arnold and Lorraine Walter
- Cover artist: Laura Crozetti and Walter
- Language: English
- Genre: Science fiction, fantasy
- Publisher: Fantasy Publishing Company, Inc.
- Publication date: 1953
- Publication place: United States
- Media type: Print (paperback)
- Pages: 327 pp
- OCLC: 4553346

Science and Sorcery is an anthology of fantasy and science fiction stories edited by Garret Ford (a pseudonym for William L. Crawford). It was published by Fantasy Publishing Company, Inc. in 1953 in an edition of 500 copies. Most of the stories originally appeared in the magazine Fantasy Book. Others appeared in the magazines Thrilling Wonder Stories, The Vortex and Weird Tales.

== Contents ==
- "Scanners Live in Vain", by Cordwainer Smith
- "The Little Man on the Subway", by Isaac Asimov & James MacCreigh
- "What Goes Up", by Alfred Coppel
- "Kleon of the Golden Sun", by Ed Earl Repp
- "How High on the Ladder?", by Leo Paige
- "Footprints", by Robert E. Gilbert
- "The Naming of Names", by Ray Bradbury
- "The Eyes", by Henry Hasse
- "The Scarlet Lunes", by Stanton A. Coblentz
- "Demobilization", by George R. Cowie
- "Voices from the Cliff", by John Martin Leahy
- "The Lost Chord", by Sam Moskowitz
- "The Watchers", by R. H. Deutsch
- "The Peaceful Martian", by J. T. Oliver
- "Escape to Yesterday", by Arthur J. Burks

== Reception ==
P. Schuyler Miller gave the anthology a negative review, describing the volume as mostly "pretty poor stuff by present-day standards."
