= Fantasy Twin =

- Dust-jacket from the first edition
- Author: L. Sprague de Camp and Stanley G. Weinbaum
- Cover artist: Crozetti
- Language: English
- Genre: Fantasy novels
- Publisher: Fantasy Publishing Company, Inc.
- Publication date: 1951
- Publication place: United States
- Media type: Print (Hardback)
- Pages: 256 pp
- OCLC: 36855350

Fantasy Twin is a collection of fantasy novels by L. Sprague de Camp and Stanley G. Weinbaum. It was published in 1951 by Fantasy Publishing Company, Inc. in an edition of 300 copies. The book is an omnibus of de Camps's The Undesired Princess and Weinbaum's The Dark Other, created by combining unbound sheets from the publisher's previous editions of the two volumes.
