= Griffin Science-Fantasy Booklet Number One =

1947 anthology edited by William L. Crawford

- Cover of the first edition
- Author: edited by William L. Crawford (anonymously)
- Cover artist: Alva Rogers
- Language: English
- Genre: Science fiction short stories
- Publisher: Griffin Publishing Company
- Publication date: 1947
- Publication place: United States
- Media type: Print (paperback)

Griffin Science-Fantasy Booklet Number One is an anthology of two science fiction stories anonymously edited by William L. Crawford. It was published as Griffin Publishing Company in 1947 in an edition of 1,000 copies. The stories originally appeared in the magazine Fantasy Book.

== Contents ==
- "The Gifts of Asti", by Andrew North
- "The Empire of Dust", by Basil Wells
