= Science-Fantasy Quintette =

1953 collection of short stories by L. Ron Hubbard and Ed Earl Repp

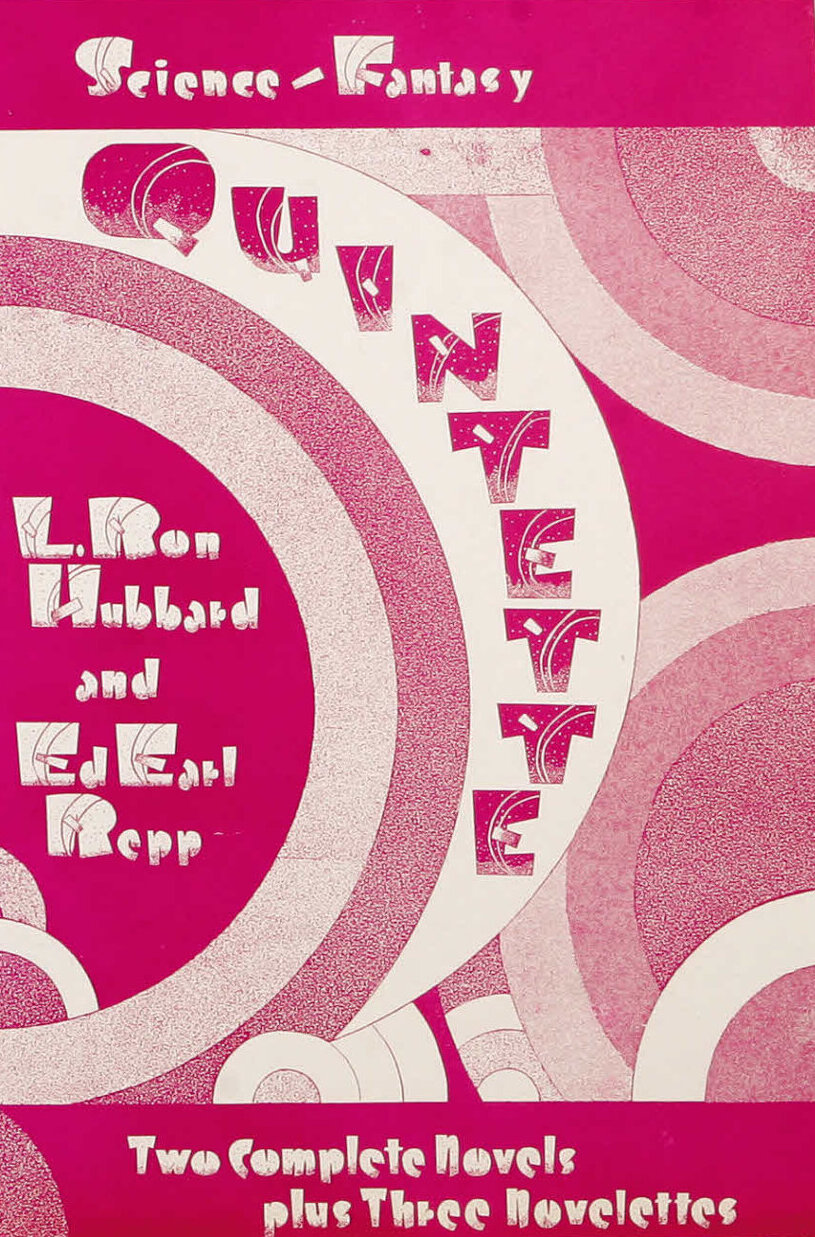
- Dust-jacket from the first edition
- Author: L. Ron Hubbard and Ed Earl Repp
- Cover artist: Walter
- Language: English
- Genre: Science fiction
- Publisher: Fantasy Publishing Company, Inc.
- Publication date: 1953
- Publication place: United States
- Media type: Print (hardback)
- Pages: 360
- OCLC: 39214633

Science-Fantasy Quintette is a collection of science fiction short stories by American writers L. Ron Hubbard and Ed Earl Repp, edited by William L. Crawford. It was published in 1953 by Fantasy Publishing Company, Inc. in an edition of 300 copies. The book is an omnibus of Repp's The Radium Pool and Hubbard's Triton. The stories originally appeared in the magazines Unknown, Amazing Stories, Fantasy Book and Science Wonder Stories.

== Contents ==
- "Triton", by L. Ron Hubbard
- "The Phantom of Terror", by Ed Earl Repp
- "The Radium Pool", by Ed Earl Repp
- "The Battle of the Wizards", by L. Ron Hubbard
- "The Red Dimension", by Ed Earl Repp
