= The Machine God Laughs =

- Dust-jacket from the first edition
- Author: edited by William L. Crawford (anonymously)
- Cover artist: Laura Ruth Crozetti
- Language: English
- Genre: Science fiction
- Publisher: Griffin Publishing Company
- Publication date: 1949
- Publication place: United States
- Media type: Print (hardback)
- Pages: 134 pp
- OCLC: 4372370

The Machine God Laughs is an anthology of three science fiction short stories edited anonymously by William L. Crawford. It was published by Griffin Publishing Company during 1949 in an edition of 1,200 copies. The stories were published originally in the magazine Fantasy Book.

== Contents ==
- "The Machine-God Laughs", by Festus Pragnell
- "Star of the Undead", by Paul Dennis Lavond (pseudonym for Robert A. W. Lowndes, Frederik Pohl & Joseph Harold Dockweiler)
- "Crusader", by Basil Wells
