= The Garden of Fear and Other Stories =

Book edited by William L. Crawford

- Cover of the first edition
- Author: edited by William L. Crawford (anonymously)
- Cover artist: Adri Ames
- Language: English
- Genre: Science fiction, fantasy
- Publisher: A Crawford Publication
- Publication date: 1945
- Publication place: United States
- Media type: Print (paperback)
- Pages: 79 pp
- OCLC: 13926556

The Garden of Fear and Other Stories is an anthology of fantasy and science fiction stories anonymously edited by William L. Crawford. It was published as A Crawford Publication in 1945 in an edition of 48,000 copies. The H. P. Lovecraft story first appeared in the magazine The Rainbow. The other stories originally appeared in the magazine Marvel Tales.

== Contents ==
- "The Garden of Fear", by Robert E. Howard
- "The Man with the Hour Glass", by Lloyd Arthur Eshbach
- "Celephais", by H. P. Lovecraft
- "Mars Colonizes", by Miles J. Breuer, M.D.
- "The Golden Bough", by David H. Keller, M.D.

== Adaptations ==
The Howard story was adapted by Marvel Comics as a Conan tale in Conan the Barbarian #9 ("The Garden of Fear", Sept 1971) by writer Roy Thomas and artist Barry Smith.
