= From Death to the Stars =

1953 collection of a fantasy novel and science fiction short stories by L. Ron Hubbard

- First edition
- Author: L. Ron Hubbard
- Cover artist: Crozetti
- Language: English
- Genre: Fantasy and Science fiction short stories
- Publisher: Fantasy Publishing Company, Inc.
- Publication date: 1953
- Publication place: United States
- Media type: Print (hardback)
- Pages: 375 pp
- OCLC: 10760074

From Death to the Stars is a collection of a fantasy novel and science fiction short stories by L. Ron Hubbard. It was published in 1953 by Fantasy Publishing Company, Inc. in an edition of 300 copies. The book is an omnibus edition of Hubbard's Death's Deputy and The Kingslayer. Many of the stories had first appeared in the magazines Unknown and Astounding.

== Contents ==
- "Death's Deputy"
- "The Kingslayer"
- "The Beast"
- "The Invaders"
