= The Creator (novelette) =

- Short story by Clifford D. Simak
- September 1935 issue of Marvel Tales
- Language: English
- Genre: Science fiction

Publication
- Publisher: Fantasy Publications
- Publication date: 1946
- Publication place: United States
- Media type: Print

"The Creator" is a science fiction novelette by American writer Clifford D. Simak. It was published in book form in 1946 by Crawford Publications in an edition of 500 copies. It had previously appeared in the September 1935 issue of the magazine Marvel Tales.

== Plot introduction ==
The novelette is narrated by a psychologist who since college has worked together with a scientist friend on exploring dreams as related the physical reality. His idea is that dreams are not unreal, but rather the self being free to explore the world beyond the limits of space and time. A recurrent dream is of a strange laboratory.

After years of work, the two friends succeed in building a machine that takes them (but not the machine itself) out of normal space and time into the dream-laboratory, which turns out to be very real. In the laboratory, they meet the Creator, an entity that has created our Universe as an experiment in a jar. They also meet a three non-human subjects, who likewise have been able to leave our Universe.

While the Creator goes on with its experiments, the two humans and the three non-humans go about building machines to return, also trying to communicate with each other.

== Sources ==
- Chalker, Jack L.; Mark Owings (1998). The Science-Fantasy Publishers: A Bibliographic History, 1923-1998. Westminster, MD and Baltimore: Mirage Press, Ltd. pp. 245, 273, 393.
- Tuck, Donald H. (1978). The Encyclopedia of Science Fiction and Fantasy. Chicago: Advent. p. 391. ISBN 0-911682-22-8.
- Ashley, Mike (2007). The Mammoth Book of Extreme Science Fiction. Running Press Book Publishers. pp. 295–321. ISBN 978-0-7867-1727-9.
