= Drôme (disambiguation) =

Drôme or Drome can mean:

- Drôme, a department of south east France
- Drôme (river), a left tributary of the Rhône which gave its name to the department
- Drôme (Aure), a smaller left tributary of the Aure in northern France
- Drome (novel) by John Martin Leahy, 1952
- Drome, Western Australia, a locality in the City of Albany
