= Men of Avalon / The White Sybil =

Anthology of two fantasy stories

- First edition
- Author: David H. Keller and Clark Ashton Smith
- Language: English
- Genre: Fantasy
- Publisher: Fantasy Publications
- Publication date: 1935
- Publication place: United States
- Media type: Print (Paperback)
- Pages: 40
- OCLC: 16766458

Men of Avalon / The White Sybil is an anthology of two fantasy stories. It was published by American company Fantasy Publications in 1935 in an edition of 500 copies. The anthology contains two stories that were submitted for the publisher's magazines, Marvel Tales and Unusual Stories, but were too long for magazine publication.

== Contents ==
- "Men of Avalon", by David H. Keller
- "The White Sybil", by Clark Ashton Smith

== Sources ==
- Chalker, Jack L.; Mark Owings (1998). The Science-Fantasy Publishers: A Bibliographic History, 1923-1998. Westminster, MD and Baltimore: Mirage Press, Ltd. p. 245.
