= Two Complete Science-Adventure Books =

US pulp science fiction magazine

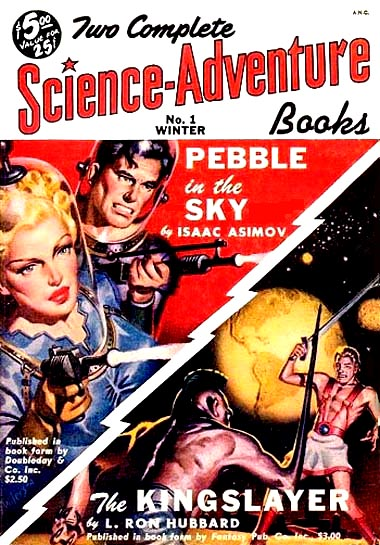
Cover of the Winter 1950 issue. Artwork is by Allen Anderson.

Two Complete Science-Adventure Books was an American pulp science fiction magazine, published by Fiction House, which lasted for eleven issues between 1950 and 1954 as a companion to Planet Stories. Each issue carried two novels or long novellas. It was initially intended to carry only reprints, but soon began to publish original stories. Contributors included Isaac Asimov, Robert A. Heinlein, Arthur C. Clarke, Poul Anderson, John Brunner, and James Blish. The magazine folded in 1954, almost at the end of the pulp era.

== Publication history ==
The early 1950s saw dramatic changes in the history of U.S. science fiction publishing. At the start of 1949, all but one of the major magazines in the field were in pulp format; by the end of 1955, almost all had either ceased publication or switched to digest format. Despite the rapid decline of the pulp market, several new science fiction magazines were launched in pulp format during these years. Planet Stories, a pulp sf magazine that focused on interplanetary adventure, was sufficiently successful to switch from quarterly to bimonthly in late 1950. The publisher, Fiction House, also decided to launch a companion magazine, aimed more specifically at the growing readership for pocket books. This was Two Complete Science-Adventure Books; the first issue was dated Winter 1950, and it appeared three times a year on a regular schedule. Malcolm Reiss, who oversaw several of Fiction House's magazines and comics, was editorially involved with the Two Complete Science-Adventure Stories throughout its life, but for the first three issues Jerome Bixby, who at that time was editing Planet Stories, took on the new magazine as well. Bixby left in 1951 to work for Standard Publications. After this, Reiss was left in sole control until 1953, when Katherine Daffron was appointed editor. Daffron edited the magazine for the last two issues. Fiction House tried another companion magazine that year, Tops in Science Fiction, but it lasted for only two issues. Two Complete Science-Adventures Books outlasted Tops in Science Fiction by only a few months; it was cancelled in 1954, amid the collapse of the overall pulp market. The final issue was dated Spring 1954, and Planet Stories itself only lasted until the following year.

Two Complete Science-Adventure Books typically carried about 80,000 words, which was noticeably more than most of its competitors, which usually ran from 45,000 to 75,000 words. Fiction House paid $300 or more for the original novels it printed. (Note: A typical book publisher of the day would pay more than this—perhaps $500 to $1,000. However, a novel printed only in a magazine could often be sold again as a book.)

== Contents ==
The magazine was originally intended to be a vehicle for reprinting novels. The title and format were an echo of Two Complete Detective Books Magazine, which had been published, also by Fiction House, in the 1930s. The first issue included Isaac Asimov's Pebble in the Sky, and L. Ron Hubbard's "The Kingslayer". Both of these were reprints: Pebble in the Sky had been published by Doubleday earlier in the year, and "The Kingslayer" had appeared in Hubbard's short story collection The Kingslayer, published by Fantasy Publishing Company, Inc., in 1949. Subsequent issues abandoned the policy of reprinting two novels, and for a while each issue featured one original story and one reprint. In some later issues both stories were original.

Although the authors included names such as James Blish and Poul Anderson, much of the material was, in the words of sf historian Joseph Marchesani, "derivative space opera", particular the original novels. The original stories that appeared in the magazine included "The Wanton of Argus", an early story by John Brunner; "Seeker of the Sphinx", by Arthur C. Clarke; "Sword of Xota" and "Sargasso of Lost Cities", both by James Blish; and "The Tritonian Ring", by L. Sprague de Camp. Reprints included The Time Machine by H.G. Wells; Beyond This Horizon, by Robert A. Heinlein (under the pseudonym Anson MacDonald); and The Humanoids by Jack Williamson.

Bixby included a column for readers' letters in the issues he edited, but Reiss and Daffron did not, and none of the three wrote editorials.

The following table shows which novels appeared in which issues.

Magazine issue	Title	Author	Original?	Notes
1 (Winter 1950)	"Pebble in the Sky"	Isaac Asimov	No	First published as a standalone novel by Doubleday in 1950. An earlier version of the story, titled "Grow Old With Me", was published in 1986 in the collection Alternate Asimovs.
1 (Winter 1950)	"The Kingslayer"	L. Ron Hubbard	No	First published in Hubbard's short story collection The Kingslayer by Fantasy Publishing Company in 1949.
2 (Spring 1951)	"The Star Kings"	Edmond Hamilton	No	First published in the September 1947 issue of Amazing Stories. First book appearance as a novel published by Frederick Fell in 1949.
2 (Spring 1951)	"Seeker of the Sphinx"	Arthur C. Clarke	Yes	First book publication in 1952 in Year's Best Science Fiction Novels: 1952, published by Frederick Fell and edited by Everett F. Bleiler and T.E. Dikty. Subsequently, published under the title "The Road to the Sea".
3 (Summer 1951)	"The Sword of Xota"	James Blish	Yes	First book publication in 1953 as a Galaxy Science Fiction Novel, under the title The Warriors of Day.
3 (Summer 1951)	"The Citadel in Space"	Neil R. Jones	Yes	
4 (Winter 1951)	"The Time Machine"	H.G. Wells	No	First published in 1895 by Henry Holt and Company.
4 (Winter 1951)	"The Tritonian Ring"	L. Sprague de Camp	Yes	First book publication by Twayne Publishers in 1953.
5 (Spring 1952)	"The Humanoids"	Jack Williamson	No	Part of Williamson's Humanoids series, the first story of which was "With Folded Hands...", published in the July 1947 issue of Astounding Science Fiction. The sequel, "...And Searching Mind" was serialized from March to May 1948 in Astounding, and subsequently published in book form as The Humanoids by Simon & Schuster in 1949, before being reprinted here.
5 (Spring 1952)	"The Outcasts of Venus"	Anaximander Powell	Yes	Anaximander Powell was the pseudonym of the poet Hyam Plutzik, who wrote this novella circa 1936–1937
6 (Summer 1952)	"The Cructars are Coming"	Paul Lawrence Payne	Yes	
6 (Summer 1952)	"Minions of the Moon"	William Gray Beyer	No	First published in Argosy over three issues, from 22 April to 6 May 1939. First book publication from Gnome Press in 1950.
7 (Winter 1952)	"Beyond this Horizon"	Anson MacDonald	No	Written by Robert A. Heinlein under a pseudonym. First published in the April and May 1942 issues of Astounding Science Fiction as by MacDonald. First book publication by Fantasy Press in 1948, as by Heinlein.
7 (Winter 1952)	"The Magellanics"	Alfred Coppel	Yes	
8 (Spring 1953)	"Sargasso of Lost Cities"	James Blish	Yes	Part of the "Cities in Flight" series. It formed part of the third book in that series, Earthman Come Home, which was first published in book form by G.P. Putnam's Sons in 1955.
8 (Spring 1953)	"Survivor of Mars"	Vargo Statten	No	An early version of this story appeared in Astounding Science Fiction in January 1938 as by John Russell Fearn ("Vargo Statten" was a pseudonym for Fearn). First book publication by Scion in 1950.
9 (Summer 1953)	"The Wanton of Argus"	Kilian Houston Brunner	Yes	The author is John Brunner, using an alternate form of his full name. This was the first novel by Brunner that he acknowledged. First book printing by Ace Books in 1963 as half of an Ace Double, under the title The Space-Time Juggler, backed with The Astronauts Must Not Land, also by Brunner.
9 (Summer 1953)	"Mission to Marakee"	Bryan Berry	No	First published as "Aftermath" in the August 1952 issue of Authentic Science Fiction. Never published in book form in English, but received first book publication in German under the title Flucht ins Weltall by Bewin-Verlag in 1955.
10 (Winter 1953)	"Silent Victory"	Poul Anderson	Yes	First book publication as part of the collection A Bicycle Built for Brew from NESFA Press in 2014.
10 (Winter 1953)	"Ballroom of the Skies"	John D. MacDonald	No	First published by Greenberg in 1952.
11 (Spring 1954)	"Tombot!"	Don Wilcox	Yes	
11 (Spring 1954)	"World Held Captive"	Bryan Berry	No	First published by Hamilton in 1952 as Born in Captivity.

== Bibliographic details ==
	Spring	Summer	Fall	Winter
1950				1/1
1951	1/2	1/3		1/4
1952	1/5	1/6		1/7
1953	1/8	1/9		1/10
1954	1/11			
Issues of Two Complete Science-Adventure Books, showing volume/issue number, and color-coded to indicate the lead editor: Jerome Bixby (blue), Malcolm Reiss (yellow), and Katherine Daffron (orange)

Two Complete Science-Adventure Books was edited primarily by Jerome Bixby for the first three issues, then by Malcolm Reiss for six issues, and then primarily by Katherine Daffron for the last two issues. Reiss was involved with editing the magazine throughout its run.

The schedule was completely regular, with issues dated Spring, Summer, and Winter of each year. The magazine was in pulp format throughout; each issue was priced at 25 cents. The first three issues were 144 pages; this was reduced to 128 pages for the Winter 1951 issue, reduced again to 112 pages for the Spring 1952 issue, and reduced further to 96 pages for the next four issues. The last two issues were 128 pages long. The publisher was listed as Wings Publishing Co., (Note: Wings was part of the Fiction House group, which published Planet Stories.) in New York for the first six issues and in Stamford, Connecticut, for the last five issues.

== Sources ==
- Anderson, Poul (2014). A Bicycle Built for Brew. Framingham MA: NESFA Press. ISBN 978-1-61037-306-7.
- Ashley, Mike (1985). "Tops in Science Fiction". In Tymn, Marshall B.; Ashley, Mike (eds.). Science Fiction, Fantasy, and Weird Fiction Magazines. Westport CT: Greenwood Press. pp. 675–677. ISBN 0-313-21221-X.
- Ashley, Mike (2000). The Time Machines:The Story of the Science-Fiction Pulp Magazines from the beginning to 1950. Liverpool: Liverpool University Press. ISBN 0-85323-865-0.
- Ashley, Mike (2005). Transformations:The Story of the Science-Fiction Magazines from 1950 to 1970. Liverpool: Liverpool University Press. ISBN 0-85323-779-4.
- Asimov, Isaac (1986). The Alternate Asimovs. New York: Doubleday. ISBN 0-385-19784-5.
- Barron, Neil (1995). Anatomy of Wonder. New Providence NJ: R.R. Bowker. ISBN 0-8352-3288-3.
- Bleiler, Everett F.; Dikty, T.E. (1952). Year's Best Science Fiction Novels: 1952. New York: Frederick Fell.
- Berry, Bryan (1952). Born in Captivity. London: Hamilton.
- Berry, Bryan (1955). Flucht ins Weltall. Bewin-Verlag.
- Currey, L.W. (1979). Science Fiction and Fantasy Authors: A Bibliography of First Printings of Their Fiction and Selected Nonfiction. Boston: G.K. Hall & Co. ISBN 0-8161-8242-6.
- de Camp, L. Sprague (1953a). Science-Fiction Handbook: The Writing of Imaginative Fiction. New York: Hermitage House.
- de Camp, L. Sprague (1953b). The Tritonian Ring. New York: Twayne Publishers.
- Fearn, John Russell (1982). Survivor of Mars. Philip Harbottle. ISBN 0-89370-796-1.
- Hamilton, Edmond (1949). The Star Kings. New York: Frederick Fell, Inc.
- Hubbard, L. Ron (1949). The Kingslayer. Los Angeles: Fantasy Publishing Company, Inc.
- MacDonald, John D. (1952). Ballroom of the Skies. New York: Greenberg.
- Marchesani, Joseph (1985). "Two Complete Science-Adventure Books". In Tymn, Marshall B.; Ashley, Mike (eds.). Science Fiction, Fantasy, and Weird Fiction Magazines. Westport CT: Greenwood Press. pp. 679–681. ISBN 0-313-21221-X.
- Plutzik, Hyam (2016). Letter from a Young Poet. Hartford: The Watkinson Library at Trinity College/Books & Books Press. ISBN 978-0-99132-717-1.
