= Marvel Tales and Unusual Stories =

American semi-professional science fiction magazines

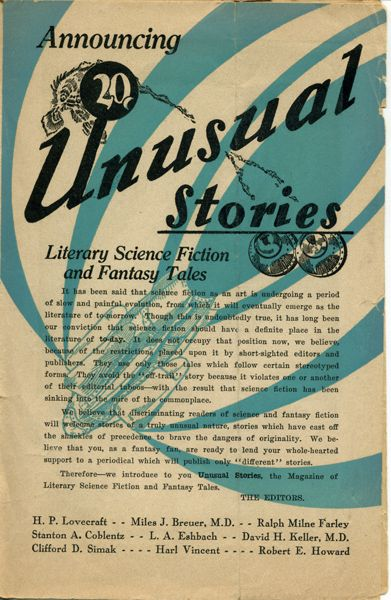
Cover of the flyer announcing Unusual Stories

Marvel Tales and Unusual Stories were two related American semi-professional science fiction magazines published in 1934 and 1935 by William L. Crawford. Crawford was a science fiction fan who believed that the pulp magazines of the time were too limited in what they would publish. In 1933, he distributed a flyer announcing Unusual Stories, and declaring that no taboos would prevent him from publishing worthwhile fiction. The flyer included a page from P. Schuyler Miller's "The Titan", which Miller had been unable to sell to the professional magazines because of its sexual content. A partial issue of Unusual Stories was distributed in early 1934, but Crawford then launched a new title, Marvel Tales, in May 1934. A total of five issues of Marvel Tales and three of Unusual Stories appeared over the next two years.

Fiction included work by well-known writers, including the first publication of Robert E. Howard's "The Garden of Fear"; a story by H. P. Lovecraft, "Celephaïs", that had previously only appeared in a literary magazine; and Clifford D. Simak's "The Creator", which had been rejected by professional markets because of its religious theme. By the start of 1936, Crawford had plans to expand his enterprise, including newsstand distribution for Marvel Tales and the publication of a series of pamphlets and hardcover books, but his finances were unequal to his ambitions, and no further issues of the magazines appeared.

== Publishing history and contents ==
The first science fiction (sf) magazine, Amazing Stories, was published in 1926, and it was soon followed by the appearance of organized groups of science fiction fans, who contacted each other by mail, using the addresses published in the letter columns of the professional magazines. Amateur magazines, eventually known as fanzines, quickly followed. William L. Crawford was an early science fiction fan, who, unusually, had enough money to acquire his own printing press. In late 1933, with the help of another fan, Lloyd Arthur Eshbach, Crawford prepared a flyer announcing a new magazine, to be titled Unusual Stories. He intended to print fantasy and horror in addition to science fiction; sf historian Sam Moskowitz suggests that this was an attempt to broaden the potential subscription base for the magazine. Crawford could not afford to pay for the stories, but offered contributors a lifetime subscription instead.

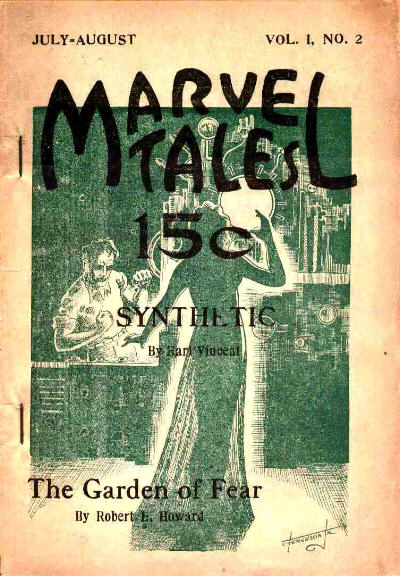
One of the two variant covers of the July/August 1934 issue of Marvel Tales

In the flyer, which appeared in November 1933, Crawford complained that science fiction in the professional magazines was being stifled by publishing taboos, and asserted that no such taboos would apply to Unusual Stories. The flyer listed the names of several well-known writers of the day, including H. P. Lovecraft, Clifford D. Simak, and Robert E. Howard, and also included a page from P. Schuyler Miller's story "The Titan", which Miller had been unable to publish because of its sexual content. Science fiction historian Mike Ashley speculates that the flyer may have influenced two editors of professional sf magazines: Desmond Hall, an assistant editor at Astounding Stories, where a "thought variant" policy was announced in the December 1933 issue, aimed at publishing more original stories; and Charles Hornig, who was shortly to become editor of Wonder Stories, where he instituted a "new policy" in the January 1934 issue which emphasized originality and barred stories that merely reworked well-worn ideas. Crawford followed the flyer with the first issue of Unusual Stories, dated March 1934; it was mailed out in two parts, which when combined included one full story: "When the Waker Sleeps", by Cyril G. Wates. Not every subscriber received the second part of the issue. It was apparent that more parts of the issue were planned, but they never appeared, and an incomplete story, "Tharda, Queen of the Vampires", by Richard Tooker, never saw full publication.

Two months later Crawford published the first issue of Marvel Tales, dated May 1934. This included material that had been planned for Unusual Stories, so it seemed that this was the same magazine under a new title. David H. Keller's "Binding Deluxe", which was horror, rather than sf, appeared, along with a story by H. P. Lovecraft, "Celephais", that had previously only been published in an amateur magazine edited by his wife, Sonia Greene. A second issue of Marvel Tales, which Crawford printed with two different covers, appeared a couple of months later, dated July/August 1934, with the number of pages increased from 40 to 60. This featured stories by Frank Belknap Long and Manly Wade Wellman, along with Robert E. Howard's "The Garden of Fear", printed under the pseudonym "James Allison"; this was the only publication of "The Garden of Fear" until Crawford reprinted it in an anthology in 1946. Crawford also announced a story competition. The third issue, dated Winter 1934, increased in size again, this time to 68 pages. "The Titan", by P. Schuyler Miller, which had been advertised in the original flyer for Unusual Stories, began serialization, and Robert Bloch's first published fiction, "Lilies", appeared, along with "The Golden Bough" by David H. Keller. Four winners of the story competition were announced, though only two ever saw print: Crawford printed "The Elfin Lights" by W. Anders Drake (a pseudonym for Eshbach), and R. DeWitt Miller's submission, "The Shapes", appeared in Astounding Stories the following February.

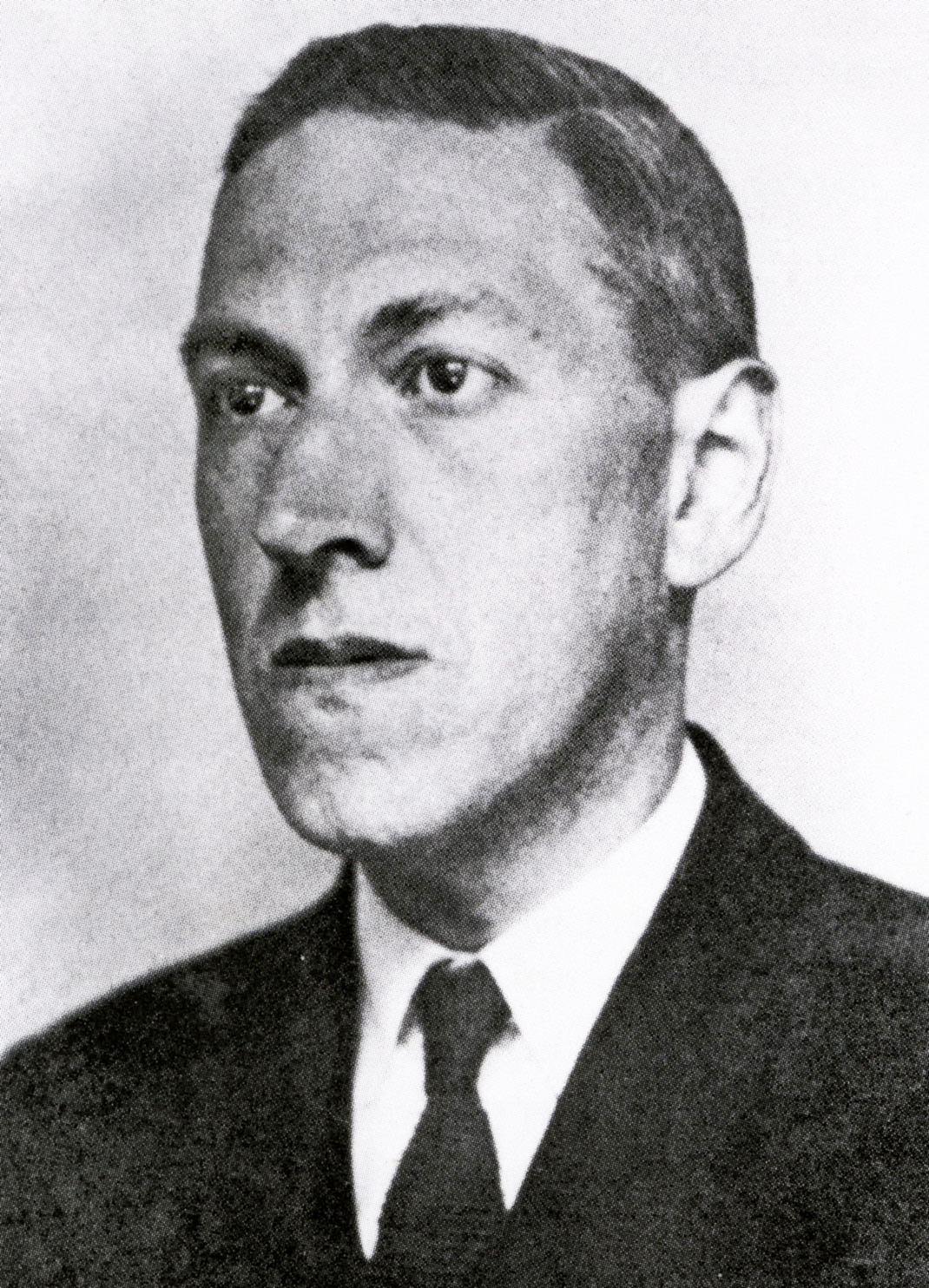
H. P. Lovecraft, who contributed to Marvel Tales

Moskowitz considers the fourth issue, dated March/April 1935, to have finally reached the level of quality that Crawford had been aiming for, with fully professional artwork, layout, and presentation. The page count had been expanded again, to 108 pages. The issue included "The Creator", by Clifford D. Simak, which Simak had been unable to sell elsewhere because of its religious content; "The Doom That Came to Sarnath", another H. P. Lovecraft story reprinted from an amateur magazine; "The Cathedral Crypt", by John Beynon Harris, later better known under the pseudonym John Wyndham; and two serial instalments: the second part of Miller's "The Titan", and part one of "The Nebula of Death", a novel by George Allan England that had been serialized in People's Favorite Magazine in 1918. Crawford announced in this issue that Unusual Stories would reappear, and also announced plans to expand into book publishing, with the initial titles projected to be Mars Mountain by Eugene George Key, People of the Crater by Andrew North (a pseudonym for Andre Norton), and The Missing Link by Ralph Milne Farley, and a series of pamphlets containing short stories. Two more issues of Unusual Stories duly appeared, a May/June 1935 issue that included poems by Forrest Ackerman and Donald Wollheim and a short story by P. Schuyler Miller, and the final issue, dated Winter 1935, which included a short story by Robert Bloch, and a poem by Robert Lowndes.

For the last issue of Marvel Tales, dated Summer 1935, Crawford increased the size from digest to pulp format. (Note: Digest-size magazines are about 19 by 13 centimetres (7.5 in × 5.1 in); pulp magazines are about 25 by 18 centimetres (9.8 in × 7.1 in).) Moskowitz describes the change as a step backwards: "the atmosphere of compact, balanced professionalism...was lost completely", but praises the quality of the contents, singling out "Mars Colonizes" by Miles Breuer as one of Breuer's best stories. The issue also included short stories by Carl Jacobi, Emil Petaja, and Ralph Milne Farley, and the next instalments of both the serials in progress, by England and Miller. There was also a non-fiction piece by Forrest Ackerman.

In 1936, Crawford announced in a fanzine, Fantasy Magazine, that he had obtained newsstand distribution for Marvel Tales, and gave details of his plans to convert it to a fully professional magazine. The next issue was to be 64 pages, priced at 15 cents, and would include stories by H. P. Lovecraft, E. E. Smith, Donald Wandrei, Murray Leinster, and others. Partial proofs were prepared, but the costs were too great for Crawford, and the issue never appeared. The proof copy included the final instalment of Miller's "The Titan", reprints of two round-robin stories (both titled The Challenge From Beyond) by well-known authors that had previously appeared in Fantasy Magazine, H. P. Lovecraft's The Shadow Over Innsmouth, and several short stories, with artwork by Clay Ferguson and Frank Utpatel. Although the magazine never appeared, Crawford did manage to publish a hardcopy edition of The Shadow Over Innsmouth in 1936.

Crawford's ambition was to demonstrate that the existing professional sf magazines were limiting the field by turning down good stories that did not fit their idea of what was acceptable. Moskowitz considers that Crawford proved his case, but without the finances to support national distribution of his magazines, he was doomed to fail. Science fiction historians Frank Parnell and Mike Ashley agree. Ashley describes Marvel Tales as "a worthwhile and exciting experiment that could have had a significant impact on the development of SF had it succeeded", and Crawford as a pioneer in his attempts to prove that science fiction need not adhere to the standard pulp formulas. Parnell and Ashley consider that Crawford was "the man who made the greatest effort to bridge the gap between the amateur and professional magazines".

== Bibliographic details ==
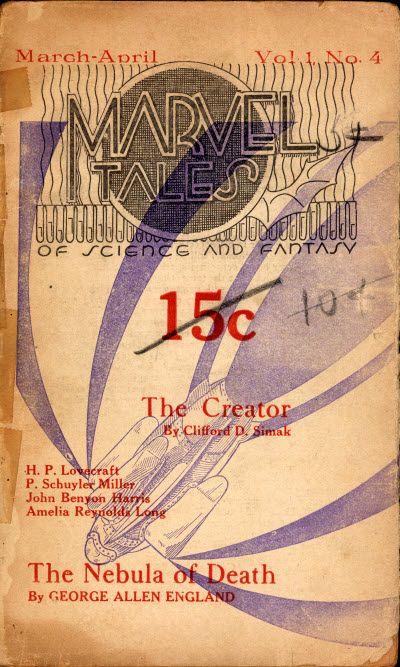
Cover of the March/April 1935 issue of Marvel Tales

Both Unusual Stories and Marvel Tales were published by Fantasy Publications of Everett, Pennsylvania, and edited by William L. Crawford. All were digest-sized except for the final issue of Marvel Tales, which was pulp-sized. The first issue of Marvel Tales was 10 cents, and the rest of the run was 15 cents; the March 1934 issue of Unusual Stories was 20 cents, and the following two issues were 10 cents. The page count varied from 40 to 68 pages, except the March/April 1935 Marvel Tales, which was 108 pages, and the March 1934 issue of Unusual Stories, which was 16 pages. The volume numbering ran from volume 1 number 1 through volume 1 number 5 for Marvel Tales; the first two issues of Unusual Stories were both volume 1 number 1, and the third and final issue was numbered volume 1 number 2.

The sequence in which the magazines were issued was as follows:

- November 1933: four-page advance flyer for Unusual Stories
- Unusual Stories March 1934, numbered 1/1. This issue was mailed out in two parts.
- Marvel Tales May 1934, numbered 1/1
- Marvel Tales July/August 1934, 1/2
- Marvel Tales Winter 1934, 1/3
- Marvel Tales March/April 1935, 1/4
- Unusual Stories May/June 1935, 1/1
- Marvel Tales Summer 1935, 1/5
- Unusual Stories Winter 1935, 1/2

The second issue of Marvel Tales, dated July/August 1934, appeared in two variations, with the covers and paper quality differing, and the story titles slightly changed for each version. Other than that the contents of the issues were identical. A number of university libraries, as well as the New York Public Library and the Library of Congress, have holdings. Six of those university libraries also have holdings of Unusual Stories. In 1946, Crawford published an anthology, The Garden of Fear and Other Stories, with the contents drawn from Marvel Tales. A facsimile edition of Marvel Tales appeared in 2012 as a single volume.

== Sources ==
- Ashley, Michael (1976). The History of the Science Fiction Magazine Vol. 1: 1926–1935. Chicago: Henry Regnery Company. ISBN 0-8092-8003-5.
- Ashley, Mike (1985). "Marvel Tales (1934-1935)". In Tymn, Marshall B.; Ashley, Mike (eds.). Science Fiction, Fantasy and Weird Fiction Magazines. Westport, Connecticut: Greenwood Press. pp. 401–404. ISBN 0-3132-1221-X.
- Ashley, Mike (2000). The Time Machines: The Story of the Science-Fiction Pulp Magazines from the beginning to 1950. Liverpool: Liverpool University Press. ISBN 0-85323-865-0.
- Crawford, William L. (2012). The Complete Marvel Tales. Tacoma, Washington: Lance Thingmaker.
- Currey, L.W. (1979). Science Fiction and Fantasy Authors: A Bibliography of First Printings of Their Fiction and Selected Nonfiction. Boston, Massachusetts: G.K. Hall & Co. ISBN 0-8161-8242-6.
- Joshi, S.T. (1996). H.P. Lovecraft: A Life. West Warwick, Rhode Island: Necronomicon Press. ISBN 978-0940884885.
- Joshi, S.T.; Schultz, David E. (2004) [2001]. An H.P. Lovecraft Encyclopedia. New York: Hippocampus Press. ISBN 0-9748789-1-X.
- Knight, Damon (1977). The Futurians. New York: John Day. OCLC 757299343.
- Moskowitz, Sam (1974) [1954]. The Immortal Storm. Westport, Connecticut: Hyperion Press. ISBN 0-88355-160-8.
- Parnell, Frank H.; Ashley, Mike (1985). Monthly Terrors: An Index to the Weird Fantasy Magazines Published in the United States and Great Britain. Westport, Connecticut: Greenwood Press. ISBN 0-313-23989-4.
