= Index to Fantasy and Science Fiction in Munsey Publications =

Book by Frank Munsey

- Author: Anonymous, (may be Bill Evans)
- Language: English
- Subject: Science fiction bibliography
- Publisher: William L. Crawford without imprint
- Publication date: no date listed (1978)
- Publication place: United States
- Media type: Print (Paperback)
- Pages: 36 pp

Index to Fantasy and Science Fiction in Munsey Publications is a bibliography of science fiction stories that appeared magazines published by Frank Munsey. It was first published in book form in 1978 by William L. Crawford, without imprint in an edition of 100 copies. Although the book is uncredited, it may be a reprint of a bibliography done for the Fantasy Amateur Press Association by Bill Evans, c.1945.
