= Stardrift and Other Fantastic Flotsam =

Short story collection

- Dust-jacket from the first edition
- Author: Emil Petaja
- Illustrator: Hannes Bok
- Cover artist: Hannes Bok
- Language: English
- Genre: Science fiction
- Publisher: Fantasy Publishing Company, Inc.
- Publication date: 1971
- Publication place: United States
- Media type: Print (hardback)
- Pages: xiii, 220 pp
- OCLC: 2592339

Stardrift and Other Fantastic Flotsam is a collection of science fiction short stories by Emil Petaja. It was first published in 1971 by Fantasy Publishing Company, Inc. in an edition of 1,500 copies. Most of the stories originally appeared in the magazines Weird Tales, If, Fantasy and Science Fiction, Amazing Stories, Fantastic Adventures, Magazine of Horror and Imagination.

== Contents ==
- Introduction, by Forrest J Ackerman
- "Stardrift"
- "Moon Fever"
- "Where Is Thy Sting"
- "A Dog’s Best Friend"
- "Peacemonger"
- "The Dark Balcony"
- "Hunger"
- "Dark Hollow"
- "Dodecagon Garden"
- "Only Gone Before"
- "The Answer"
- "Be a Wingdinger, Earn Big Money"
- "Pattern for Plunde"
- "Found Objects"
