= Behind the Evidence =

1936 novel by Amelia Reynolds Long

- Dust-jacket from the first edition
- Author: by Peter Reynolds (pseudonym of Amelia Reynolds Long and William L. Crawford)
- Cover artist: Clay Ferguson
- Language: English
- Genre: Science fiction novel
- Publisher: Visionary Publishing Company
- Publication date: 1936
- Publication place: United States
- Media type: Print (hardback & paperback)
- Pages: vii, 228 pp
- OCLC: 11294016

Behind the Evidence is a science fiction novel by authors Amelia Reynolds Long and William L. Crawford writing under the pseudonym Peter Reynolds. It was published in 1936 by the Visionary Publishing Company in an edition of 100 copies.

== Plot introduction ==
The novel concerns conspiracy theories and a case similar to the Lindbergh kidnapping but set in a fictional Germanic country.
