= Henry M. Eichner =

- Born: October 9, 1909; Cleveland, Ohio, United States
- Died: November 24, 1971 (aged 63)
- Occupations: medical artist, illustrator, writer
- Writing career
- Subject: Atlantis

Henry M. Eichner (1909–1971) was an American medical artist, illustrator and writer. He did covers and illustrations for the Los Angeles Science Fantasy Society's magazine Shangri L'Affaires. His nonfiction book on Atlantis, Atlantean Chronicles, was published by Fantasy Publishing Company, Inc. in 1971.
