= The Stellar Missiles =

- Dust-jacket from the first edition
- Author: Ed Earl Repp
- Cover artist: William Benulis
- Language: English
- Genre: Science fiction
- Publisher: Fantasy Publishing Company, Inc.
- Publication date: 1949
- Publication place: United States
- Media type: Print (hardback & paperback)
- Pages: 192
- OCLC: 1803393

The Stellar Missiles is a collection of science fiction short stories by American writer Ed Earl Repp. It was published in 1949 by Fantasy Publishing Company, Inc. in an edition of 500 hardcover and 200 paperback copies. The stories originally appeared in the magazines Science Wonder Stories, Amazing Stories and Planet Stories.

== Contents ==
- "The Stellar Missile"
- "The Second Missile" – This story posits that the explosive Tunguska event in 1908 was caused by an alien space ship.
- "The Quest of the Immortal"
