= Darrell C. Richardson =

American Baptist minister and bibliographer (1918–2006)

- Born: May 17, 1918; Baxter Springs, Kansas, US
- Died: September 19, 2006 (aged 88); Memphis, Tennessee, US
- Occupations: Baptist minister, bibliographer, writer
- Writing career
- Subjects: Max Brand, J. Allen St. John (as bibliographer)

Darrell Coleman Richardson (May 17, 1918 – September 19, 2006) was an American Baptist minister and bibliographer, the author of 44 books. He served as Director of the National Fantasy Fan Federation and was involved in the Cincinnati Fantasy Group and the Memphis Science Fiction Association. Richardson was a noted authority on authors Frederick Faust and Edgar Rice Burroughs. The Darrell Awards are named in his honor.

His best known work, Max Brand: The Man and His Work, was published by Fantasy Publishing Company, Inc. in 1952.

== Life ==
Richardson studied at Furman University in Greenville, South Carolina and Southern Baptist Theological Seminary in Louisville, Kentucky.

He served as pastor in Kentucky and as a U.S. Army Chaplain before moving to Tennessee to work with the Southern Baptist Brotherhood Commission.

He married Sarah Sanders in 1942 and they were married until her death in 1995.

He collected rare books and items belonging to pulp fiction writers, as well as the works of fantasy artists such as J. Allen St. John, acquiring more than 80,000 items.

In 2003, he co-founded the Old Tiger Press, which specialized in science fiction-related volumes.

== Awards ==
- E. E. Evans Big Heart Award (1982)
- Lamont Award (1986)
- Phoenix Award (1992)

== Publications ==
His books include;

- Allen St. John: An Illustrated Bibliography
- Max Brand: The Man and his work
- Those Macabre Pulps
- Mountain Rising: The Story of James Anderson Burns and Oneida Institute
- The Fabulous Faust Vil. I, No. 2 (ed.)
