= George Henry Weiss =

American poet, writer and novelist

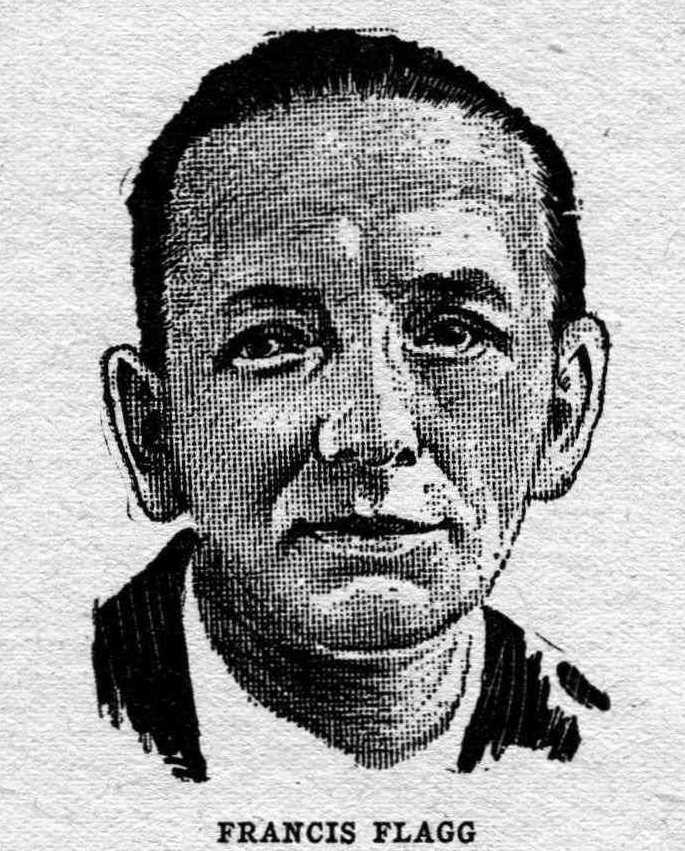
- Weiss as depicted in Wonder Stories c. 1930
- Born: 1898; Halifax, Nova Scotia, Canada
- Died: 1946 (aged 47–48)
- Occupations: Poet; short story writer; novelist
- Writing career
- Pen name: Francis Flagg
- Genre: Science fiction

George Henry Weiss (1898–1946) was an American poet, writer and novelist. His science fiction stories and poetry appeared under the pseudonym "Francis Flagg" in the magazines Amazing Stories, Astounding, Tales of Wonder, Weird Tales and others. His novel The Night People was published by Fantasy Publishing Company, Inc. in 1947.

== Bibliography ==
=== Short stories ===
- The Machine Man of Ardathia, Amazing Stories, November 1927.
- The Mentanicals, Amazing Stories, April 1934.
- Earth's Lucky Day (with Forrest J. Ackerman), Wonder Stories, March 1936.
- The Seeds of the Toc-Toc Birds
- The Heads of Apex

=== Novels ===
- The Night People (1947)
