= Darrell Awards =

American literary award for sci-fi, fantasy, and horror

The Darrell Awards are American literary awards intended to promote literacy in the United States Mid-South by recognizing the best published Mid-South regional science fiction, fantasy, and horror. The awards consider a work Mid-South regional if the author lives in the Mid-South or if the work prominently features the Mid-South. The awards are named after Darrell C. Richardson, founding member of Memphis Science Fiction Association (MSFA). Nominations are open until the 1st of each February. The Darrell Awards Jury selects the winners, with the winners announced at MidSouthCon annually.

== History ==
The Darrell Awards were founded in 1996 by the Memphis Science Fiction Association (MSFA) and are now sponsored by the Darrell Awards Jury. They were named in honor of Dr. Darrell C. Richardson, a member of First Fandom and one of the founding members of MSFA. Darrell, who was most well known for his involvement in Edgar Rice Burroughs fandom, much approved of the honor and made a donation to MSFA in support of the effort.

In 1997, the first two Darrell Awards were presented at Midsouthcon, held that year in Tunica, Mississippi. One went to D.B. Smith for best short stories of the previous two years and one went to Gary L. Holleman for best novels of the same time period.

The following year (1998), there was no Midsouthcon held and MSFA decided to present the Darrell Awards anyway. They were bestowed at Borders Books & Music Cafe in Germantown, Tennessee - winners Jack McDevitt for Eternity Road (best novel of 1997) and Stephen Climer for By Any Name of Devil (best short story of 1997). Kathleen Ann Goonan was a surprise guest who heard about the awards and flew in for the ceremonies. Her novel Mississippi Blues received an honorable mention.

From 1999 through 2008, the Darrell Awards have been presented at Midsouthcon in the hotel on the corner of Airways and Democrat in Memphis, Tennessee. During this period, the categories have grown to include short stories, novellas, novels and other media (such as film, comics, games and plays). In 2009 and 2010, MidSouthCon moved to Whispering Woods in Olive Branch, Mississippi, and the Darrell Awards were presented there. The 2011 MidSouthCon is slated to be held at the East Memphis Hilton, back in Memphis, Tennessee, and the Jury expects to present the Awards at that venue.

Starting in 2002, the awards jury added a Hall of Fame to recognize authors who had a body of work that either came out before the Darrell Awards started or that was more extensive than just one work. Kathleen Ann Goonan was the first inductee into the Hall of Fame, for her series of novels that had begun with "Mississippi Blues", as well as her "Bride of Elvis" short story. The following year, 2003, it was renamed the Dal Coger Memorial Hall of Fame in memory of Dalvan Coger, a long-time member of MSFA who had died in October 2002.

The Darrell Awards jury had planned to issue a book commemorating the first decade of the Darrell Awards and the Coger Hall of Fame.

== Previous winners ==
Previous winners include Sheree Renée Thomas, Kevin Andrew Murphy, Beth Alvarez, Elizabeth Donald, Aaron Christopher Drown and Robin Burks.

== Categories ==
- Best Midsouth Novel
- Best Midsouth Novella
- Best Midsouth Short Story
- Best Midsouth Other Works
