= The Atom Clock =

1951 play by Cornel Lengyel

- Dust-jacket from the first edition
- Author: Cornel Lengyel
- Language: English
- Genre: Science fiction play
- Publisher: Fantasy Publishing Company, Inc.
- Publication date: 1951
- Publication place: United States
- Media type: Print (Hardback and Paperback)
- Pages: 66 pp
- OCLC: 2617068

The Atom Clock is a science fiction play by Cornel Lengyel. It was published in 1951 by Fantasy Publishing Company, Inc. in an edition of 1,000 copies of which 250 were hardcover. The play received the Maxwell Anderson Award in 1950.

== Plot introduction ==
The play concerns a worker who rebels against military control of atomic energy.
