= The Night People (novel) =

1947 novel by Francis Flagg

- Cover of the first edition
- Author: Francis Flagg
- Cover artist: Alva Rogers
- Language: English
- Genre: Science fiction novel
- Publisher: Fantasy Publishing Company, Inc.
- Publication date: 1947
- Publication place: United States
- Media type: Print (Paperback)
- Pages: 32 pp
- OCLC: 7237044

The Night People is a science fiction novel by author Francis Flagg. It was published in 1947 by Fantasy Publishing Company, Inc. (FPCI) in an edition of 500 copies. It is the first book published under the FPCI imprint.

== Plot introduction ==
The novel concerns J. Smith who breaks out of prison by means of time travel.
