= Max Brand: The Man and His Work =

- Dust-jacket from the first edition
- Author: by Darrell C. Richardson
- Cover artist: H. Richardson
- Language: English
- Subject: Bibliography of Frederick Faust
- Publisher: Fantasy Publishing Company, Inc.
- Publication date: 1952
- Publication place: United States
- Media type: Print (Hardback)
- Pages: 198 pp
- OCLC: 1855887

Max Brand: The Man and His Work is a bibliography of works by American author Frederick Faust, who wrote under the pen name Max Brand. The bibliography was compiled by Darrell C. Richardson. It was published by Fantasy Publishing Company, Inc. in 1952 in an edition of 900 copies. The book is enlarged from Richardson's previous The Fabulous Faust Fanzine.
