= Hyam Plutzik =

American poet (1911–1962)

- Born: July 13, 1911; Brooklyn, New York, US
- Died: January 8, 1962 (aged 50); Rochester, New York, US
- Occupation: Poet

Hyam Plutzik (July 13, 1911 – January 8, 1962) was an American poet and educator best known for his long narrative poem Horatio. Three of Plutzik's books, including Horatio, were finalists for the Pulitzer Prize for poetry. Since his death, several new books related to his life and work have been published, with forewords written by noted poets and scholars, including Anthony Hecht (1987), David Scott Kastan (2012), Daniel Halpern (2017), Richard Blanco (2021), and Edward Hirsch (2023).

During his lifetime, Plutzik published poems in the New York Times Sunday Book Review, Sewanee Review, Beloit Poetry Journal, Poetry-New York, Hopkins Review, Epoch, Furioso, Prairie Schooner, Yale Review, American Scholar, Antioch Review, New World Writing, The Nation, Saturday Review (U.S. magazine), Voices, Transatlantic Review, Christian Science Monitor, and Kenyon Review.

In 1960, Alfred Kreymborg, juror for the 1960 Pulitzer Prize in Poetry, said of Plutzik: "While he is not a musical poet like most of his contemporaries, he more than compensates by the strength and depth of his writing and the power of his visions and personality."

== Biography ==
Plutzik was born in Brooklyn in 1911 to Belarusian immigrants Samuel and Sadie Plutzik. He spent his early childhood with his family on a farm in Southbury, Connecticut. Plutzik did not learn English until he started school, held at a local one-room schoolhouse, at the age of 7, as his family spoke Yiddish, Russian, and Hebrew at home. In 1923, when he was 12, Plutzik moved to Bristol, Connecticut, where his father led a synagogue and community school.

An avid reader, Plutzik graduated from high school in 1928 and attended Trinity College in Hartford, Connecticut, on a Holland Scholarship. While at Trinity, Plutzik studied closely with Professor Odell Shepard, a Pulitzer-winning biographer. He also pursued his literary passions as an editor for the student newspaper, The Trinity Tripod, and as associate editor of the school's literary magazine, The Trinity Tablet. The Tablet eventually published one of the writer's early short stories, "The Golus", as well as a set of his poems, "Three Paintings".

In 1932, Plutzik graduated Phi Beta Kappa from Trinity and received a two-year fellowship to study literature at Yale University. In 1933, he won the Yale Poetry Prize for "The Three"; he would win again seven years later for "Death at The Purple Rim". Plutzik left Yale after two years, his degree unfinished. He noted in a letter to his mentor that discomfort with the discipline of academic life was a motivating factor in his decision.

Inspired by his mentor Odell Shepard, Plutzik returned to the Connecticut countryside to seek a "Thoreauvian" lifestyle. During his time there, he wrote "My Sister", a tribute to a younger sibling who had died at the age of four. While in Connecticut, Plutzik also wrote "Death at the Purple Rim", a narrative poem exploring the ethical issues around nonviolence. Prominent critic Mark Van Doren described the latter poem as "strangely and clearly powerful," writing that he had "read nothing better in a long while, and nothing [he was] likelier to remember."

Plutzik moved back to Brooklyn in 1934, working as a feature writer and secretary to the editor-in-chief of the Brooklyn Daily Eagle. In 1940, Plutzik returned to Yale to complete his master's degree with a thesis on Thomas Carlyle and Walt Whitman. In 1954, Plutzik would again return to Yale, this time on a Ford Foundation grant, to study the relationship between poetry, science, and philosophy.

While he completed his oral exams, he did not submit a dissertation to receive the Doctorate. In 1941, over six months, he composed a 72-page letter to Odell Shepherd about his personal and intellectual growth since leaving Trinity. The letter was discovered in the Odell Shepard Archive at Trinity and published by the Watkinson Library in 2015, titled Letter From a Young Poet; it was described as "a song of the self and the soul" by Daniel Halpern, who wrote the foreword to the book.

Shortly after the attack on Pearl Harbor, Plutzik enlisted in the Army Air Corps, serving as a drill sergeant and first lieutenant. Stationed at various bases in the American South, he became keenly aware of the impact of segregation. This experience inspired such poems as "To Abraham Lincoln, That He Walk By Day" and "The Road". In 1944, he became an ordnance and education officer for the Eighth Army. He was stationed in Norfolk, England, and participated in support activities for the D-Day landings. He would later publish several poems that grew out of his military experience, including "On the Airfield at Shipdham", "The Airman Who Flew Over Shakespeare's England", and "The Old War". Plutzik also began drafting his long poem Horatio during this period.

Returning to civilian life, Plutzik became an instructor in the English department at the University of Rochester. He spent 16 years (1946–62) teaching at the University of Rochester, and served as Deane Professor of Rhetoric and Poetry from 1961 until his death the following year. As a teacher, Plutzik created a solid foundation for poetry in the English department at the University of Rochester and Upstate New York, where he remained for the rest of his professional life.

He married his wife, Tanya Roth Plutzik, in 1943. They would go on to have four children: daughters Roberta and Deborah, and sons Alan and Jonathan. Tanya passed away on July 5, 2025, at the age of 106.

Hyam Plutzik died of melanoma at the age of 50 on January 8, 1962, in Rochester, New York. Upon Plutzik's death, the University of Rochester established the Plutzik Poetry Series—which has welcomed more than 300 readers—to celebrate his contributions to the school, the field of poetry, and his commitment to the continuous improvement of the craft.

== Poetry and career ==
Plutzik submitted his first collection, "House of Gorya and Other Poems", to Scribner's in 1945. After Scribner's turned down the manuscript, Plutzik wrote an additional 52 poems and repackaged the work as Aspects of Proteus, published by Harper and Brothers in 1949. His 1952 story, "Outcasts of Venus", was published under the pseudonym of Anaximander Powell in Two Complete Science-Adventure Books, a pulp magazine. He also wrote a long speculative poem, "Mythos", about a group of astronauts journeying through space. In 1959, Wesleyan University Press published Plutzik's second collection, Apples from Shinar.

In 1960, Plutzik wrote a plan for the literary projects he hoped to complete in the coming years. These planned works included a play in verse on the fall of Athens in the Peloponnesian Wars. He also planned a long poem on the Holocaust, which was to include a section on Anne Frank and another on Lapichy, his ancestral hometown in Belarus.

Horatio, published in 1961, is perhaps the most notable of the poet's work. Inspired by Shakespeare's Hamlet, Horatio centers on the search for truth. The work focuses on Horatio's efforts to "tell aright" the story of his friend, the Danish prince. Sections of Horatio had previously been published in magazines and Apples from Shinar. Horatio was named a finalist for the Pulitzer Prize in Poetry that year, with jurors Stanley Kunitz and Louis Untermeyer calling the poem "a fascinating puzzle". In the 2011 foreword to the centennial edition of Plutzik's Apple from Shinar, Yale scholar David Scott Kastan called Horatio "one of the genuinely original and important American long poems."

== Contemporary recognition ==
During his time as a student, Plutzik was twice awarded Yale's Albert Stanburrough Cook prize, for "The Three" (1933) and "Death at the Purple Rim" (1941).

By the early 1960s, notable writers such as Sylvia Plath, Ted Hughes, and Thom Gunn were already among Plutzik's early admirers. Plath first published Plutzik's work in England in 1961 in the Critical Quarterly Poetry Supplement. In 1963, Ted Hughes and Thom Gunn brought more of Plutzik's work to British readers. The pair included 16 of Plutzik's poems in their 1963 anthology, Five American Poets, alongside the work of Edgar Bowers, Howard Nemerov, Louis Simpson, and William Stafford.

When he became UK Poet Laureate in 1984, Ted Hughes revisited the impact of Plutzik's poetry on his own work, saying Plutzik's poems had "haunted [him] for 25 years. And they seem even more alive and special now than they did when [he] first found them." He went on to say that, at Plutzik's best, his work seems "marvelously achieved, a sacred book."

== Posthumous publications and recognition ==
In the 1970s, Joseph Brodsky translated parts of Horatio into Russian for a theatrical presentation in the Soviet Union. In 2014, author James S. Shapiro included an excerpt of Horatio in Shakespeare in America: An Anthology from the Revolution to Now, and the New York Review of Books review called the work "an ambitious poem."

In 1987, BOA Editions published Plutzik's Collected Poems, edited by Anthony Hecht, who wrote in the introduction that Plutzik was "a poet of such remarkable achievement."

In 1999, the Plutzik Library for Contemporary Writing was dedicated at the University of Rochester, and in 2004, Plutzik was recognized in a campus publication as one of the most outstanding teachers in the university's history.

In his 2001 book Cold War Poetry: The Social Text in the Fifties Poem, Edouard Brunner wrote: "Plutzik's achievement is stunning," saying some of his works "go unmatched by any other postwar poetry except that of Langston Hughes or Gwendolyn Brooks."

The city of Rochester declared May 11, 2002, Hyam Plutzik Day in recognition of his contributions to the community. "Sprig of Lilac" was noted as the official poem of the Lilac Festival.

A film about Plutzik's life and work, Hyam Plutzik: American Poet, was released in 2007, directed by Oscar nominee Christine Choy and Ku-Ling Siegel. It featured appearances by prominent American poets such as Hayden Carruth, Donald Hall, Galway Kinnell, Stanley Kunitz, and Grace Schulman. The film was featured at the Jewish Film Festival in Jerusalem in 2007, the Zebra Poetry Film Festival in Berlin in 2008, and the Las Vegas Film Festival in 2021.

In May 2012, The Paris Review published a feature article on Plutzik by Edward Moran and Phillip Witte, "A Great Stag – Broad Antlered: Rediscovering Hyam Plutzik."

In 2021, Miami-based publisher Suburbano Ediciones debuted a collection of Plutzik translations with the publication of 32 Poems / 32 Poemas, a bilingual Spanish-English edition. The collection includes a foreword by Richard Blanco.

In 2022, Plutzik's poem "The Seventh Avenue Express" was published for the first time by the University of Rochester's Meliora Press to mark the 60th anniversary of the Pluzik Poetry Series.

In 2025, Academic Studies Press published Hyam Plutzik, American Jewish Poet: Memory, Loss and Time, a collection of essays and poetry (including previously unpublished work) edited by Dr. Victoria Aarons, Dr. Sandor Goodhart, and Dr. Holli Levitsky. Twenty scholars contributed to the volume, including Alan Berger, Maxim Shrayer, Sara Horowitz, Phyllis Lassner, Cary Nelson, Monica Osborne, Naomi Sokoloff, Eric Sundquist, and Rodger Kamenetz.

== Books ==
- The Three (Yale University Prize Poem, 1933). New Haven, Conn.: Yale University Press, 1933. (Pamphlet)
- Death at the Purple Rim (Yale University Prize Poem, 1941). Brooklyn: The Artisan Press, 1941. 37pp
- Aspects of Proteus, a book of poems. New York: Harper & Brothers, 1949. 94pp.
- Apples from Shinar: A book of poems. Middletown, Conn.: Wesleyan University Press, 1959. 59pp.
- Horatio. New York: Atheneum, 1961. 89pp.
- Hyam Plutzik: The Collected Poems, with a foreword by Anthony Hecht. Brockport, N.Y..: BOA Editions, 1987. 313pp.
- Apples from Shinar: Special Edition, with an afterword by David Scott Kastan. Middletown, Conn.: Wesleyan University Press, 2011. 74pp.
- 32 Poems / 32 Poemas. Bilingual (English-Spanish) edition with a foreword by Richard Blanco. Miami: Suburbano Ediciones, 2021.

== Awards ==
- Yale University: Prize Poem (J.S. Cook Award for "The Three"). 1933
- Yale University: Prize Poem (J.S. Cook Award for "The Purple Rim"). 1941
- National Institute of Arts and Letters: Award for accomplishment in lyric and narrative poetry. 1950
- Poetry Awards Prize: for a Book of Verse (subsequently known as the Borestone Mountain Poetry Awards). Shared award with Rolfe Humphries. 1951
- University of Rochester Summer Faculty Fellowship for Creative Writing. 1954
- Ford Foundation Faculty Fellowship for study of science as background to modern poetry 1954–1955.
- University of Rochester Summer Faculty Fellowship for Creative Writing. 1954
- University of Rochester Summer Faculty Fellowship for Creative Writing. 1958
- Lillian Fairchild Award (Rochester) for Best Work of Imagination. 1959
