= Planets of Adventure =

- Dust-jacket from the first edition
- Author: Basil Wells
- Cover artist: Jack Gaughan
- Language: English
- Genre: Science fiction
- Publisher: Fantasy Publishing Company, Inc.
- Publication date: 1949
- Publication place: United States
- Media type: Print (hardback)
- Pages: 292
- OCLC: 5973502

Planets of Adventure is a collection of science fiction short stories by American writer Basil Wells. It was published in 1949 by Fantasy Publishing Company, Inc. in an edition of 1,500 copies. Most of the stories originally appeared in the magazines Fantasy Book, Planet Stories and Future.

== Contents ==
- "Empire of the Dust"
- "The Twisted Men"
- "The Hairy Ones"
- "Prison Rats"
- "Gateways"
- "Quest of Thig"
- "Power for Darm"
- "A Knight for Miss Merkins"
- "Caverns of Ith"
- "Wall of Darkness"
- "The Swift People"
- "World of Misters"
- "Planet of New Men"
- "Crusader"
- "Scrambled World"
