= Atlantean Chronicles =

- Dust-jacket from the first edition
- Author: Henry M. Eichner
- Cover artist: Henry M. Eichner
- Language: English
- Subject: Atlantis
- Publisher: Fantasy Publishing Company, Inc.
- Publication date: 1971
- Publication place: United States
- Media type: Print (Hardback)
- Pages: 230 pp
- OCLC: 1314068

Atlantean Chronicles is a 1970 study of Atlantis by Henry M. Eichner. It was first published in 1971 by Fantasy Publishing Company, Inc. in an edition of 1,250 copies. An abridged version of the book was later serialized in the Perry Rhodan books.
