= Doorways to Space =

- Dust-jacket from the first edition
- Author: Basil Wells
- Cover artist: William Benulis
- Language: English
- Genre: Science fiction short stories
- Publisher: Fantasy Publishing Company, Inc.
- Publication date: 1951
- Publication place: United States
- Media type: Print (hardback)
- Pages: 206 pp
- OCLC: 6169267

Doorways to Space is a collection of science fiction short stories by Basil Wells. It was published in 1951 by Fantasy Publishing Company, Inc. in an edition of 700 copies. The stories were original to this collection.

== Contents ==
- "The Lurkers of Burm"
- "The Singer"
- "Barren World"
- "Planet of the Mist"
- "Lord of the Desert Planet"
- "Rebellion on Venus"
- "The Aliens"
- "Space Woman"
- "The Sudden Forest"
- "The Elfin Hills"
- "Conquest"
- "Martyr from Mars"
- "Chrysalid"
- "Exiles of the Forbidden Planet"
- "The Chair"
