= Hidden World (novel) =

1935 novel by Stanton A. Coblentz

- Avalon Books edition, 1957
- Author: Stanton A. Coblentz
- Cover artist: Ric Binkley
- Language: English
- Genre: Science fiction
- Published: 1957 (Avalon Books)
- Publication place: United States of America
- Media type: Print
- Pages: 224 (Hardback edition)
- OCLC: 2854677

Hidden World is a satiric science fiction novel by American writer Stanton A. Coblentz. It was originally published as a magazine serial in Wonder Stories (Mar, Apr, May 1935) as In Caverns Below. It was first published in book form in 1957 by Avalon Books.

== Plot introduction ==
Underlying the Basin and Range province of North America, giant caverns, some many miles in diameter, form a network that is occupied by people who have evolved the adaptations (such as pale skin) for living underground. Completely isolated from the upper world, the people have created a civilization that is technologically more advanced than that of 1935 America.

== Plot ==
While exploring an abandoned silver mine in Nevada, Philip Clay and Frank Comstock are separated from their team and trapped by a cave-in triggered by a series of earthquakes. As they try to find a way out of the trap they come to a corridor with smooth walls and floor. They eventually see light, follow it, and come to a place overlooking a vast cavern, filled with yellow-green light, where a mighty battle plays out before them.

Spotted by the combatants and fired upon, the two men run for their lives and get separated from each other in the confusion. Frank is captured by a group of men with chalk-white faces and taken to a large underground city. The chalk-faces attempt to put Frank to death as a spy, but his notebook blocks the death ray. One chalk-face notices the book, examines it, and takes Frank into his custody.

The chalk-face is Professor Tan Torm, who wants to study Frank and his obviously primitive culture. He gives the task of teaching Frank the local language to his daughter Loa, who falls in love with Frank. The standard of beauty in this underground realm is fat and wrinkled, so Frank employs various pretenses of decorum to keep a good distance from Loa. Once he learns the language he goes to work for the Ventilation Company, the corporation that supplies the underground realm of Wu with fresh air from the surface.

Frank discovers that the vast caverns comprising the realms of Wu and Zu span hundreds of miles, primarily under Nevada, Utah, and Arizona. Those realms have been at war with each other more or less continuously for thousands of years. War both keeps the population down (in both senses of the word) and provides big profits for large corporations. Frank works his way up the social scale and also discovers a hidden way to turn off Wu's air supply. Using the latter, he deposes the dictator and takes his place.

Frank's efforts to reform the society of Wu meet so much resistance and resentment that he is compelled to renew the war with Zu, whose own dictator has just been deposed. The new dictator of Zu turns out to be Philip Clay in disguise. The two men meet in secret and then, pursued by their erstwhile minions, they flee to a ventilation shaft where Frank has stashed climbing equipment. They return to the upper world and stagger into a mining camp in California, where they are finally rescued.

== Sources ==
- Barron, Neil (2004). Anatomy of Wonder: A Critical Guide to Science Fiction, 5th Edition. Westport, Connecticut: Libraries Unlimited. Pg 167. ISBN 1-59158-171-0.
- Clute, John, and David Langford. "Coblentz, Stanton A." The Encyclopedia of Science Fiction. Eds. John Clute, David Langford, Peter Nicholls and Graham Sleight. Gollancz, 25 Augugust 2015. Web. 7 Sept. 2016.
- Tuck, Donald H. (1974). The Encyclopedia of Science Fiction and Fantasy. Chicago: Advent. pg 106. ISBN 0-911682-20-1.

== Listings ==
The book is listed at

- The Library of Congress as http://lccn.loc.gov/57012666
- WorldCat as OCLC 2854677
