= The Sunken World =

1928 novel by Stanton A. Coblentz

- Dust-jacket from the first edition
- Author: Stanton A. Coblentz
- Cover artist: Roy Hunt
- Language: English
- Genre: Science fiction
- Publisher: Fantasy Publishing Company, Inc.
- Publication date: 1928
- Publication place: United States
- Pages: 184

The Sunken World is a science fiction novel by American writer Stanton A. Coblentz. It was first published in book form in 1948 by Fantasy Publishing Company, Inc. in an edition of 1,000 copies. The novel originally appeared in the Summer 1928 issue of the magazine Amazing Stories Quarterly. It was Coblentz's first published science fiction novel.

== Plot summary ==
The novel concerns Anton Harkness, the commander of an advanced American submarine (with a reinforced hull) in World War I, which gets caught in a whirlpool and dragged to the bottom of the sea, where it collides with a glass dome. The submarine damages the dome, but the danger is not immediately realized. The crew are rescued by the Atlanteans who live beneath the dome; the crew lives alongside them. During that time, Harkness falls in love with Aelios, an Atlantean. After about a decade, the damage from the submarine collision becomes more serious, and Harkness, Aelios, and some of the crew board a ship to contact the surface for help. When they return, it's revealed the dome has flooded and Atlantis has collapsed.

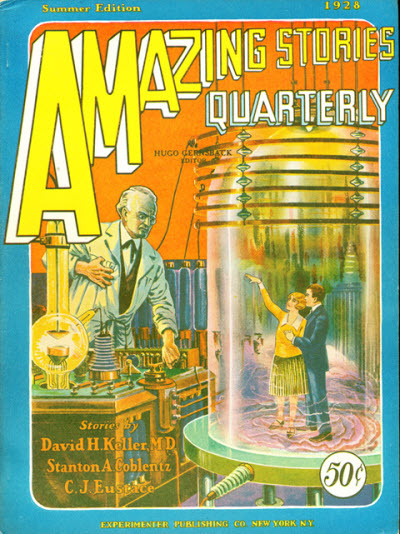
The Sunken World was originally published in the Summer 1928 issue of Amazing Stories Quarterly.

== See also ==
- List of underwater science fiction works

== Sources ==
- Chalker, Jack L.; Mark Owings (1998). The Science-Fantasy Publishers: A Bibliographic History, 1923–1998. Westminster, MD and Baltimore: Mirage Press, Ltd. p. 269.
- Crawford, Jr., Joseph H.; James J. Donahue; Donald M. Grant (1953). "333", A Bibliography of the Science-Fantasy Novel. Providence, RI: The Grandon Company. p. 20. OCLC 3924496.
- Tuck, Donald H. (1974). The Encyclopedia of Science Fiction and Fantasy. Chicago: Advent. p. 106. ISBN 0-911682-20-1.
