= The Undesired Princess =

Book by Lyon Sprague de Camp

- Dust-jacket for The Undesired Princess
- Author: L. Sprague de Camp
- Cover artist: Crozetti
- Language: English
- Genre: Fantasy
- Publisher: Fantasy Publishing Company, Inc.
- Publication date: 1951
- Publication place: United States
- Media type: Print (hardback)
- Pages: 248

The Undesired Princess is a 51,000 word fantasy novella by American writer L. Sprague de Camp. It was first published in the fantasy magazine Unknown Worlds for February 1942. It was published in book form by Fantasy Publishing Company, Inc. in 1951. The book version also includes the 10,000 word fantasy short story "Mr. Arson", first published in Unknown for December 1941. The book (including both stories) was bound together with Stanley G. Weinbaum's The Dark Other in the omnibus collection Fantasy Twin by the same publisher in 1953. The title story was also published in paperback by Baen Books in 1990 together with David Drake's story The Enchanted Bunny, under the combined title The Undesired Princess & the Enchanted Bunny.

The first stand-alone edition of the title story was published as an E-book by Gollancz's SF Gateway imprint on September 29, 2011 as part of a general release of de Camp's works in electronic form. The product description indicates that the e-edition is based on the Baen publication, and includes the Drake story in addition to the title story; however, the Drake story is not in fact included.

== Contents ==
=== The Undesired Princess ===
The title story concerns Rollin Hobart, a man transported to another plane whose natural laws are those of Aristotelian logic; that is, everything is either one thing or another, with nothing in between and no gray areas. Similarly, everything is limited in color and, with the exception of the inhabitants, in shape: leaves are blue or yellow and are flat, regular polygons in shape; the title character has paper-white skin and lips of primary color red. He must learn to use and master the inflexible laws of this universe in order to survive and ultimately return home. In the course of his adventures he picks up a royal local lady-love and rises to become the master of the plane, but elects to abandon both to return to his mundane life. The lady, however, has her own ideas about that...

=== Mr. Arson ===
The second story features Carl Grinnig, who accidentally conjures up a Saldine or fire-elemental while taking a correspondence course on Nigromancy. The Saldine, Mr. Arson, attempts to unleash his fellow Saldines on the human world, only to find the situation complicated by humanity itself. This story is enlivened by the author's own experience with correspondence schools.

== Reception ==
Critical response to the book has been largely favorable. At the time of its publication P. Schuyler Miller commented that "Hobart's adventures ... have the utterly reasonable brand of unreasonableness which most [de Camp] readers know and relish," and called the second story as "a bonus," concluding "[i]f you like humor-in-fantasy, who can afford to miss a new de Camp?" Anthony Boucher and J. Francis McComas called it one "of the best novels from 'Unknown,'" and stated it had "that splendid absurd rigorousness which distinguishes such other vintage de Camp items as the Harold Shea series." Groff Conklin, on the other hand, felt the book suffered by comparison to Rogue Queen, another de Camp novel published the same year, which he found much more impressive. He cited the unevenness in quality he perceived between the two books as an example of "why de Camp has puzzled and exasperated his fans." He noted that "[e]verything in the [titular] tale has [a] haywire quality of being or not being, plus a lot of pleasant de Campish plotcident and nonsense along with it." Summing up his opinion of the two stories in the book, he wrote that "[b]oth these fantasies are clever, glib, and wholly unimportant."

In more recent assessments, Everett F. Bleiler reported that The Undesired Princess "is amusing and entertaining, for the first half of the story." Steven Silver, commenting on the Baen edition, wrote that "[t]he plot of The Undesired Princess is simple, almost simplistic. Even the philosophy, as presented, is rather basic. However, the ideas behind that philosophy, which de Camp explains well enough for the reader to understand what de Camp is trying to do and follow their own conclusions regarding how it should be interpreted, is quite complex." Noting that the story "covers many of the themes which de Camp & Fletcher Pratt explored in the 'Compleat Enchanter' series," and that "these topics are not covered as well or as completely in The Undesired Princess," he concludes that "the book is still enjoyable and a worthwhile read." Don D'Ammassa, while dismissing de Camp's pre-1960 solo fantasies as "comparatively minor," called The Undesired Princess "the best of these ... with frequently hilarious developments."

== Sources ==
- Chalker, Jack L.; Mark Owings (1998). The Science-Fantasy Publishers: A Bibliographic History, 1923-1998. Westminster, MD and Baltimore: Mirage Press, Ltd. p. 271.
