= The Planet of Youth =

1952 novel by Stanton A. Coblentz

- Dust-jacket from the first edition
- Author: Stanton A. Coblentz
- Cover artist: Walter
- Language: English
- Genre: Science fiction
- Publisher: Fantasy Publishing Company, Inc.
- Publication date: 1952
- Publication place: United States
- Media type: Print (hardback & paperback)
- Pages: 71
- OCLC: 6674904

The Planet of Youth is a science fiction novella by American writer Stanton A. Coblentz. It was first published in book form in 1952 by Fantasy Publishing Company, Inc. in an edition of 600 copies, of which 300 were hardback. The novel originally appeared in the October 1932 issue of the magazine Wonder Stories.

== Plot introduction ==
The novel concerns the first real estate boom on the planet Venus.

== Reception ==
Boucher and McComas found the novel to have dated badly, "pleasing in period for its irony and economy, but pretty slight today."

== Sources ==
- Chalker, Jack L.; Mark Owings (1998). The Science-Fantasy Publishers: A Bibliographic History, 1923-1998. Westminster, MD and Baltimore: Mirage Press, Ltd. pp. 271–272.
- Tuck, Donald H. (1974). The Encyclopedia of Science Fiction and Fantasy. Chicago: Advent. p. 106. ISBN 0-911682-20-1.
