= Cornel Lengyel =

American poet

- Born: January 2, 1914; Fairfield, Connecticut, United States
- Died: March 12, 2003 (aged 89); Georgetown, California, United States
- Occupations: Poet; historian; playwright; translator
- Writing career
- Pen name: Cornel Adam
- Genres: poetry, drama
- Subject: history
- Notable awards: Maxwell Anderson Award (1950), Castagnola Prize (1971)

Cornel Adam Lengyel (January 2, 1914 – March 12, 2003) was an American poet, historian, playwright and translator. He received the Maxwell Anderson Award in 1950 for his play The Atom Clock.

== Biography ==
Cornel Adam (Lengyel) was born in Fairfield, Connecticut, in 1915. In 1920, his family moved to Budafok, Hungary. Cornel became fluent in Magyar. In 1922, his family moved to Cleveland, Ohio. In 1925, his family moved to Hollywood.

In 1930, he won a $500 award for his prize essay on Les Miserables in an international competition. In 1933, his first book of poems Thirty Pieces was published. These early successes set the stage for a life of poetry and letters. He said, much later in life, “The most improbable, impractical thing I can think of is being a poet. Yet I am still writing poetry. It's like an adolescent vice. It persists through life.”

In 1935, his first poetic drama The World's My Village won the Berkeley Playcrafters Production Prize and was later published in Poet Lore. From 1937, as playwright for the Federal Theatre, his Bridge-Builders was performed with chorus and symphony at the Veterans' Auditorium in San Francisco. In 1939 and 1940 he worked for the WPA on the History of Music in San Francisco series.

During World War Two he served in several capacities: with the U. S. Office of Censorship, in the Uncommon Language Department, as chief examiner for a year; as shipwright in the Kaiser Shipyards, he helped build the world's fastest constructed Liberty vessel, the Robert E. Peary. He was active as staff officer in the U. S. Merchant Marine. While overseas, he won the Maritime Poetry Award, first prize in an international contest; the late William Rose Benet read his verse over CBS.

In 1945, he was recipient of the Albert M. Bender Literary Award for a group of two dozen short stories. He worked as a fire lookout and, in July 1945, saw the refracted light from the first atomic test. In 1946, he fled the city for eighty acres in the woods of El Dorado Forest near Georgetown, California. In 1950, his poetic drama The Atom Clock won the Maxwell Anderson Award. Selections of the play were featured in the Saturday Review of Literature. In 1951 (and again in 1963), he was awarded a Resident Fellowship in Literature at the Huntington Hartford Foundation in Pacific Palisades.

From 1952 to 1954 he worked as an editor for the W.H. Freeman company. From 1962 to 1963, he was a visiting lecturer at Sacramento State. In 1967, he was a MacDowell Colony resident. From 1968 to 1969, he was a writer in residence at Hamline University, St. Paul. In 1969, he was an Ossabaw Island Foundation fellow, and also a guest lecturer at MIT. In 1969, he founded Dragon's Teeth Press and continued as executive editor, publishing works of poetry, fiction, and plays. In 1971, he was awarded the Castagnola prize from the Poetry Society of America for the in-progress Latter Day Psalms. In 1976, he was awarded a National Endowment for the Arts fellowship.

He continued to write poetry, history, and philosophical essays. He also continued to publish the works of other poets and writers in Dragon's Teeth Press. He died in 2003.

== Works ==
- First Poems (1940)
- The Atom Clock (1951)
- Four Days in July: the Story Behind the Declaration of Independence (1958)
- I, Benedict Arnold (1960).
- Presidents of the United States (1961)
- The Master Plan (1978).
- The Creative Self (1971)
- The Lookout's Letters and other Poems (1971)
- El Dorado Forest, Selected Poems, 1935-1985 (1986)
