= Drome (novel) =

1952 novel written and illustrated by John Martin Leahy

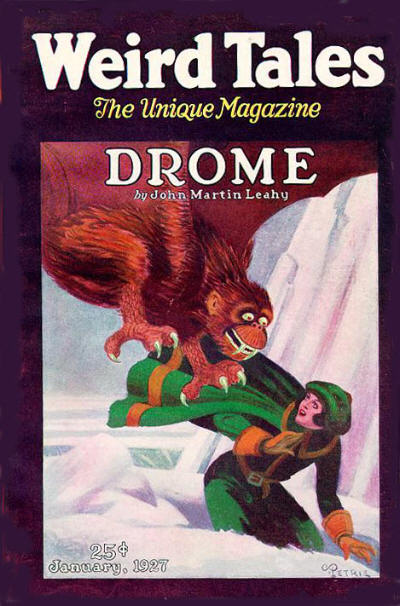
- Drome cover for Weird Tales, 1927
- Author: John Martin Leahy
- Illustrator: John Martin Leahy
- Language: English
- Genre: Fantasy novel
- Publisher: Popular Fiction Publishing Company (serial); Fantasy Publishing Company, Inc. (book)
- Publication date: 1927 (serial); 1952 (book)
- Publication place: United States
- Media type: Print (Hardback)
- Pages: 295 pp (book)
- OCLC: 5979793
- Text: Drome at Wikisource

Drome is a fantasy novel written and illustrated by John Martin Leahy. Originally serialized in the magazine Weird Tales in five parts beginning January 1927, it was first published in book form in 1952 by Fantasy Publishing Company, Inc., in an edition of 1,000 copies.

== Plot introduction ==
Two explorers travel miles beneath Mount Rainier and discover a cavernous realm, filled with glowing mist, called Drome, which is home to a lost civilization and fantastic animals including bat-apes, snake-cats and tree-octopuses.

== Reception ==
P. Schuyler Miller described the story as quaint by 1953 standards, but praised "its classical quotations, bolstering allusions to dubious science, and real warmth and humor." Everett F. Bleiler faulted the novel for doing little to explain its mysteries and for being "greatly padded with 'philosophy of life', quotations from various authorities scientific and philosophical, lists of great men, and exclamations and comments in Siwash."
