= The Kingslayer =

1949 short story collection by L. Ron Hubbard

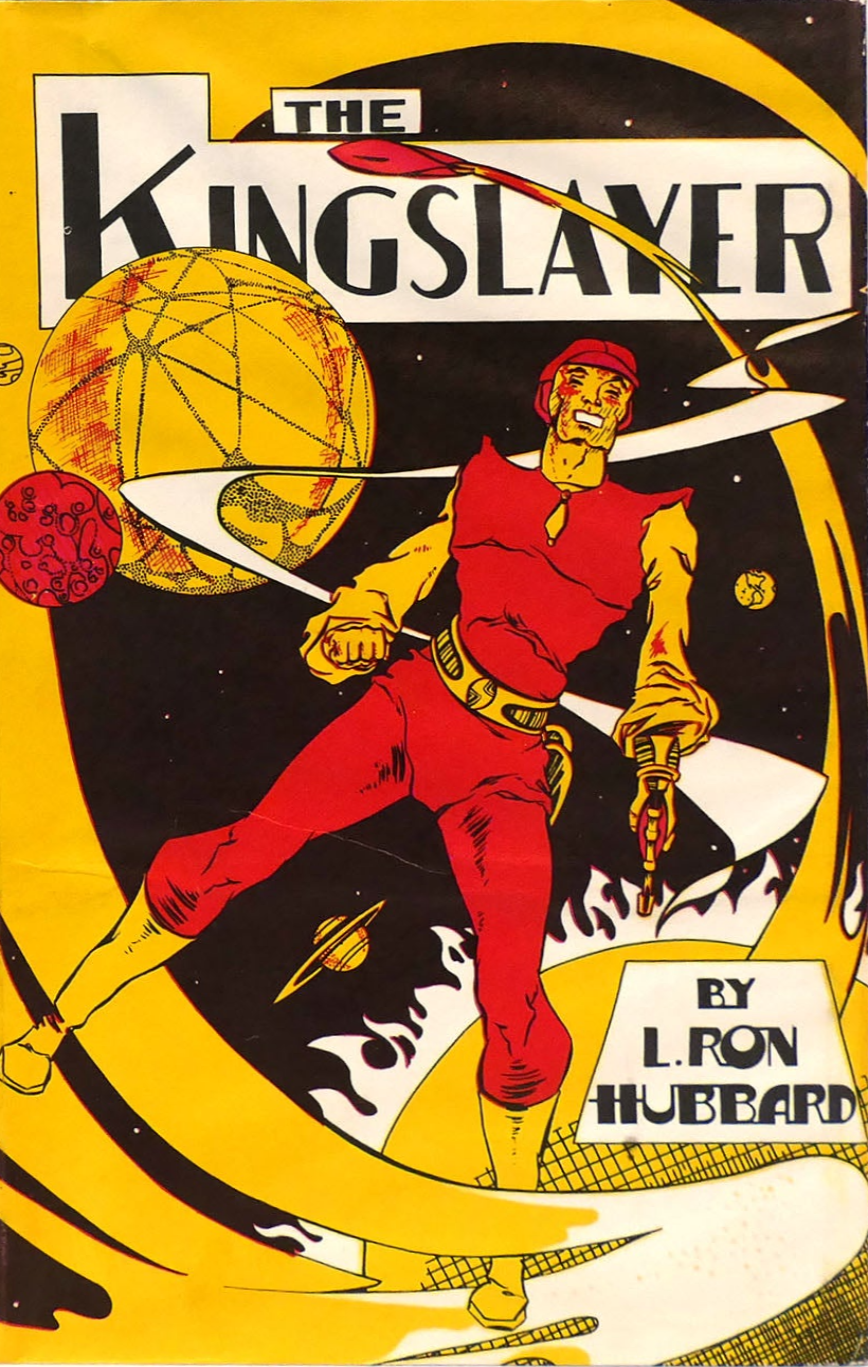
- Dust-jacket from the first edition
- Author: L. Ron Hubbard
- Cover artist: William Benulis
- Language: English
- Genre: Science fiction
- Publisher: Fantasy Publishing Company, Inc.
- Publication date: 1949
- Publication place: United States
- Media type: Print (hardback)
- Pages: 208
- OCLC: 52003995

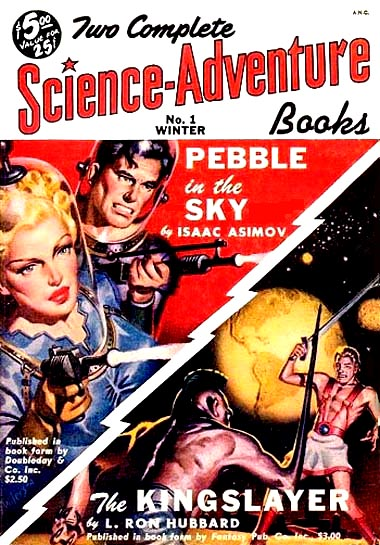
The title novella was reprinted in Two Complete Science-Adventure Books in 1950

The Kingslayer is a collection of science fiction short stories by American writer L. Ron Hubbard. It was first published in 1949 by Fantasy Publishing Company, Inc. in an edition of 1,200 copies. The title story first appeared in this collection. The other stories had previously appeared in the magazine Astounding SF.

== Contents ==
- Preface
- "The Kingslayer"
- "The Beast"
- "The Invaders"
- "The Nate"

== Sources ==
- Chalker, Jack L.; Mark Owings (1998). The Science-Fantasy Publishers: A Bibliographic History, 1923-1998. Westminster, MD and Baltimore: Mirage Press, Ltd. pp. 269–270.
- Contento, William G. "Index to Science Fiction Anthologies and Collections". Archived from the original on January 23, 2009.
- Tuck, Donald H. (1974). The Encyclopedia of Science Fiction and Fantasy. Chicago: Advent. p. 233. ISBN 0-911682-20-1.
