= Garan the Eternal =

Book by Andre Norton

- First edition
- Author: Andre Norton
- Cover artist: Morris Scott Dollens
- Language: English
- Genre: Science fiction
- Publisher: Fantasy Publishing Company, Inc.
- Publication date: 1972
- Publication place: United States
- Pages: 199
- OCLC: 629185

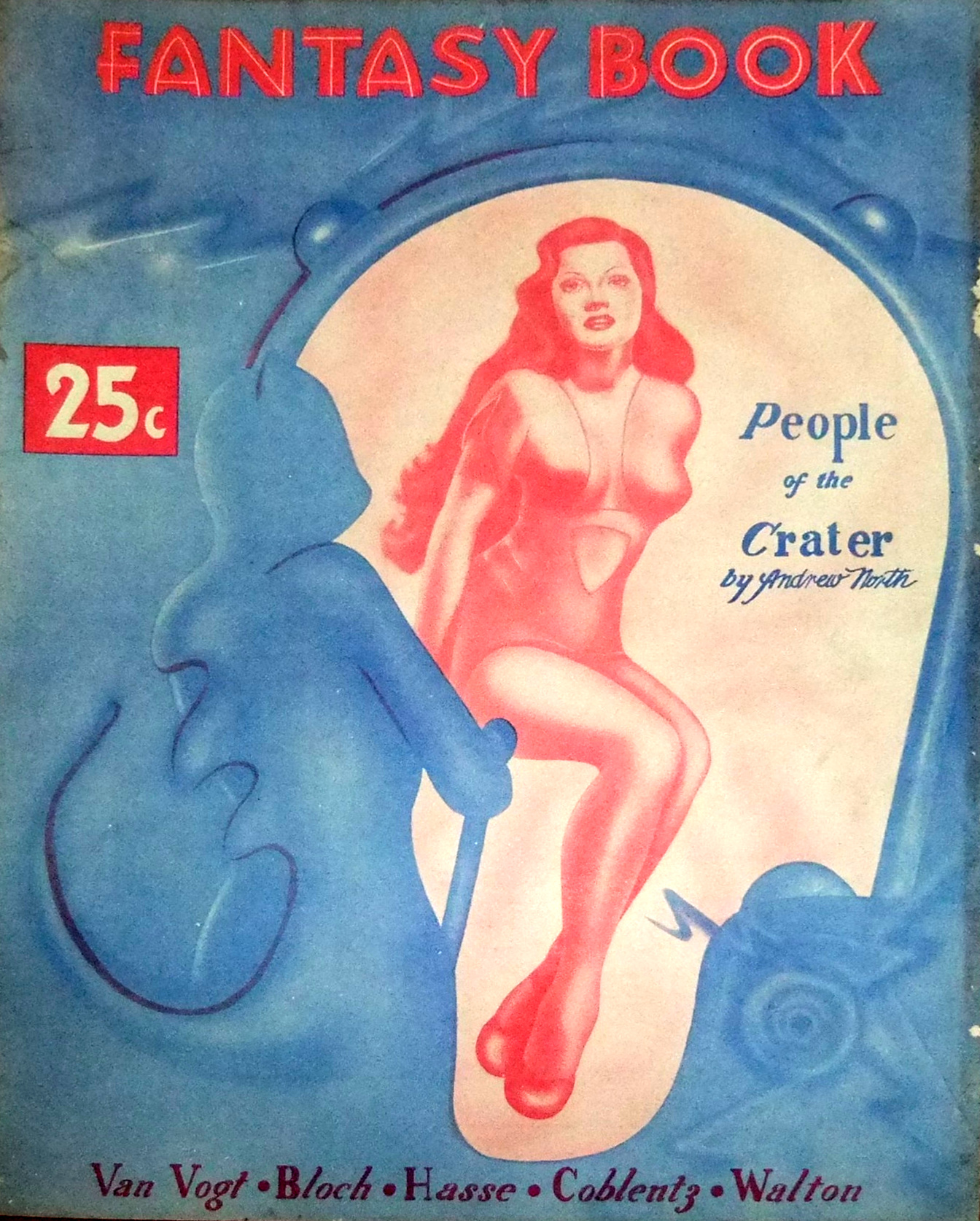
Norton's novelette "The People of the Crater", published under her "Andrew North" pseudonym, was originally published as the cover story in the debut issue of Fantasy Book in 1947.

Garan the Eternal is a collection of science fiction short fiction by American writer Andre Norton. It was first published in a hardcover edition of 1,300 copies by Fantasy Publishing Company, Inc. in December 1972. The first paperback edition was issued by DAW Books in March 1973, and was reprinted in July 1975, December 1978, June 1985, and September 1987.]

The book collects four short stories, novelettes and novellas by Norton, including the "Witch World" story "Legacy from Sorn-Fen." The book marks the first complete publication of "Garan of Yu-Lac," as the magazine in which it was originally serialized folded before the third and final part could be published.

== Contents ==
- Introduction
- "Garin of Tav" (alternate title, "People of the Crater", in some editions) (from Fantasy Book v. 1 no. 1, July 1947)
- "Garan of Yu-Lac" (from Spaceway, v. 4, no. 3-v. 5, no. 1, September–October 1969, May–June 1970)
- "Legacy from Sorn-Fen" (original to the collection)
- "One Spell Wizard" (original to the collection)

== Sources ==
- Chalker, Jack L.; Mark Owings (1998). The Science-Fantasy Publishers: A Bibliographic History, 1923–1998. Westminster, MD and Baltimore: Mirage Press, Ltd. p. 273.
- Clute, John; John Grant (1997). The Encyclopedia of Fantasy. New York: St. Martin's Press. p. 693. ISBN 0-88184-708-9.
- Clute, John; Peter Nicholls (1995). The Encyclopedia of Science Fiction. New York: St. Martin's Griffin. p. 877. ISBN 0-312-13486-X.
- Contento, William G. "Index to Science Fiction Anthologies and Collections".
- Jaffery, Sheldon (1987). Future and Fantastic Worlds: A Bibliographic Retrospective of DAW Books (1972–1987). Mercer Island, WA: Starmont House, Inc. p. 15. ISBN 1-55742-002-5.
- Watts, Jay P. (March 31, 2008). "A Great Lady's Work". Archived from the original on February 16, 2008.
