= Amelia Reynolds Long =

American science fiction story writer and mystery novelist

- Graduation photo of Reynolds Long from the University of Pennsylvania, 1931.
- Born: November 25, 1904; Columbia, Pennsylvania
- Died: March 26, 1978 (aged 73); Harrisburg, Pennsylvania
- Occupations: Short story writer; novelist; poet
- Writing career
- Pen name: Peter Reynolds (sometimes with William L. Crawford)
- Genres: Detective fiction, Science fiction

Amelia Reynolds Long (November 25, 1904 – March 26, 1978) was an American detective fiction writer, novelist, and a pioneer woman writer for the early science fiction magazines of the 1930s.

== Biography ==
Born in Columbia, Pennsylvania, Long moved at age six with her family to Harrisburg, Pennsylvania, where she lived the rest of her life.

Long received a bachelor's degree from the University of Pennsylvania in 1931, and a master's degree from Penn in 1932. Long was the author of a number of science fiction stories, including "A Leak in the Fountain of Youth" and "Scandal in the Fourth Dimension". Her Weird Tales story, "The Thought-Monster", was made into the 1958 British science fiction film Fiend Without a Face. The story's sale to the film's producers was brokered by her agent Forrest J Ackerman.

Some of her stories appeared under the byline "A. R. Long." Using the combined pseudonym Peter Reynolds, Long co-wrote the 1936 novel Behind the Evidence with William L. Crawford, based on the Lindbergh kidnapping case.

In the 1940s, influenced by Agatha Christie, Long turned from science fiction to writing mysteries. Between 1939 and 1952, she published more than 30 murder mystery novels. In 1951, Long became a textbook editor for Stackpole Books. She also began to write poetry, participating in the Harrisburg Poetry Workshop of the Pennsylvania Poetry Society. Long edited the society's 1977 anthology, Pennsylvania Poems. Later in life, Long worked for 15 years as a curator at the William Penn Memorial Museum.

Long never married or had children. She died in 1978, at age 73.
