= The Radium Pool =

1949 collection of science fiction stories by Ed Earl Repp

- Dust-jacket from the first edition
- Author: Ed Earl Repp
- Cover artist: Jack Gaughan
- Language: English
- Genre: Science fiction
- Publisher: Fantasy Publishing Company, Inc.
- Publication date: 1949
- Publication place: United States
- Media type: Print (hardback & paperback)
- Pages: 188
- OCLC: 2668368

The Radium Pool is a collection of science fiction stories by American writer Ed Earl Repp, comprising the title novella and two short stories. It was published in 1949 by Fantasy Publishing Company, Inc. in an edition of 700 hardcover and 300 paperback copies. The stories originally appeared in the magazines Amazing Stories and Science Wonder Stories.

== Contents ==
- "The Radium Pool" (1929)
- "The Phantom of Terror" (1933)
- "The Red Dimension" (1930)
