= William L. Crawford =

American publisher and editor (1911–1984)

- Born: September 10, 1911; Trafford, Pennsylvania, U.S.
- Died: January 25, 1984 (aged 72)
- Occupations: Publisher; editor; printer; novelist
- Writing career
- Pen name: Peter Reynolds (with Amelia Reynolds Long), Garret Ford: based on his wife's name-Margaret Crawford
- Genre: Science fiction

William Levi Crawford (September 10, 1911 – January 25, 1984) was an American publisher and editor.

== Career ==
During the autumn of 1933, Crawford, a West Coast science fiction fan, proposed to start a non-paying weird fiction magazine, Unusual Stories, which was initiated soon afterward. About the same time he also published the magazine Marvel Tales. For Unusual Stories he commissioned a brief autobiography by H.P. Lovecraft, Autobiography: Some Notes on a Nonentity, although it was never published in the magazine. He also accepted Lovecraft's Celephais and The Doom That Came to Sarnath for Unusual Stories, but they were published instead in Marvel Tales (May 1934 and March–April 1935, respectively). Around July 1934 Lovecraft wrote Some Notes on Interplanetary Fiction for one of Crawford's magazines, but the essay was published in the magazine The Californian (Winter 1935). Lovecraft's correspondent Duane W. Rimel wrote the tale "The Jewels of Charlotte" (possibly revised by Lovecraft) which was published in Unusual Stories, May–June 1935. Robert Bloch's early story "Black Lotus" appeared in Unusual Stories in 1935.

In 1935, Crawford published the collection Mars Mountain, by Eugene George Key. It was the first full-size book issued by a publisher that specialized in science fiction. It was a poorly produced hardcover of 142 pages and was not well-received when it appeared. At this time Crawford had ambitious publishing plans and promised hardcover editions of Andrew North's People of the Crater and Ralph Milne Farley's The Missing Link; the Farley title never appeared but the North (pseudonym of Andre Norton) title was finally issued in 1972 as part of the collection Garan the Eternal.

During the spring of 1935 Crawford contemplated reviving the defunct magazine Fantasy Fan with Lovecraft as editor, but the plan was never realized. He also thought of issuing one of Lovecraft's stories At the Mountains of Madness or The Shadow Over Innsmouth as a booklet, or bound together in one volume; he considered submitting the latter story to Astounding Stories after learning of the acceptance there of At the Mountains of Madness and The Shadow Out of Time but it is not known whether he did so. In late 1935, he began the process of issuing The Shadow Over Innsmouth as a book. The project came to fruition in November 1936 (although the copyright page declares the date of publication as April 1936), under Crawford's Visionary Publishing Co imprint; but the book had so many typographical errors that Lovecraft insisted on an errata sheet (which was also faulty). The Shadow Over Innsmouth was the only book of Lovecraft's fiction to be published and distributed during Lovecraft's own lifetime. Crawford printed 400 copies but bound only 200; the others were destroyed later. According to Robert Weinberg, few copies of the book were sold, even though it was available at the bargain price of $1 a copy. It featured good paper, black linen binding and a dust jacket and four interior illustrations by Frank Utpatel. Crawford wrote of the venture in his essay "Lovecraft's First Book" in The Shuttered Room and Other Pieces; reprinted in Lovecraft Remembered. Its failure, and the poor sales of a third (nonfantasy) book convinced Crawford of the futility of his efforts.

Future projects, which would have included a hardcover edition of E.E. Smith's The Skylark of Space, were dropped. (This title was later published by the Buffalo Book Company in 1946 by Thomas G. Hadley, Donald M. Grant and Kenneth Krueger).

Crawford published books under a number of different imprints before founding the Fantasy Publishing Company, Inc. in 1946. He edited several anthologies that he also published. He co-wrote the 1936 novel Behind the Evidence with Amelia Reynolds Long under the combined pseudonym Peter Reynolds.

In 1953 Crawford's Fantasy Publishing Company published and edited Science-Fantasy Quintette (300 copies), which included short stories by authors L. Ron Hubbard and Ed Earl Repp. Spaceway was another magazine Crawford started that contained stories by L. Ron Hubbard.

From 1970 through 1974 William Crawford organized four Witchcraft and Sorcery Conventions. While this was the chosen name at the time, the emphasis was mainly on Science Fiction and Fantasy with an inclusion of fictional literature that also related to "witchcraft and sorcery" fiction.

Other conventions that he and his wife, Margaret Crawford, founded were Fantasy Faire and Science Fiction Weekend. Famous authors and others who were a part of these conventions included Ray Bradbury, Marion Zimmer Bradley, Edmond Hamilton, Leigh Brackett, A. E. van Vogt, and many others. ("Lost: A Living Legend," a tribute by Forrest J. Ackermann in To the Stars, a fanzine, issue #2, 1984).

William L. Crawford's earliest involvement in the field included his membership in LASFAS (began pre-World War II), the Los Angeles Science Fantasy Society, where he had befriended Ray Bradbury and other famous authors and fans.

The William L. Crawford Memorial Award for the best first fantasy novel is named in his honor. Andre Norton was the creator of this award which is still actively presented to qualifying individuals.

Crawford retained a large volume of unbound FCPI books and offered them with paper bindings at low prices through the 1970s.

While a bit off the grid in some ways (the earlier references to his publication efforts do not include that his printing machines from the 1950s on were literally in his garage due to a very minimal budget), William L. Crawford was connected with numerous famous individuals in the Science Fiction genre, including Forrest Ackerman (Forrest J Ackerman). These were the people who, in essence, started and kept alive the science fiction genre until it was ultimately embraced by many due to famous television shows (Star Trek and more) and movies (Star Wars, etc.).
