= John Martin Leahy =

American novelist

- Born: May 16, 1886; Newcastle, Washington, United States
- Died: March 26, 1967 (aged 80); Seattle, Washington, United States
- Occupations: Short story writer; novelist; artist
- Writing career
- Genres: weird fiction, fantasy

John Martin Leahy (May 16, 1886 – March 26, 1967) was an American short story writer, novelist and artist. He wrote and illustrated weird stories that appeared in pulp magazines such as Weird Tales and Science and Invention. His novel Drome was published by Fantasy Publishing Company, Inc., in 1952.

His short story "In Amundsen’s Tent" (1928) is a precursor of both H. P. Lovecraft’s "At the Mountains of Madness" and John W. Campbell Jr.’s "Who Goes There?".

== Works ==
Draconda (Weird Tales Nov. 1923 – May/Jun./Jul. 1924)

The Living Death (Science & Invention Oct. 1924 – Jun. 1925)

"The Voices From the Cliff" (Weird Tales May 1925)

"The Voice of Bills" (Weird Tales Oct. 1926)

Drome (Weird Tales Jan. 1927 – Jul. 1927; book form 1952)

"In Amundsen's Tent" (Weird Tales Jan. 1928; reprinted Aug. 1935)

"The Isle of the Fairy Morgana" (Weird Tales Feb. 1928)

== Sources ==
- Clute, John; Peter Nicholls (1995). The Encyclopedia of Science Fiction. New York: St. Martin's Griffin. p. 699. ISBN 0-312-13486-X.
- Kevin Daniel (2007). "Art Collection". Archived from the original on 2008-05-03.
- Tuck, Donald H. (1974). The Encyclopedia of Science Fiction and Fantasy. Chicago: Advent. p. 268. ISBN 0-911682-20-1.
