= Triton (collection) =

1949 collection of fantasy short stories by L. Ron Hubbard

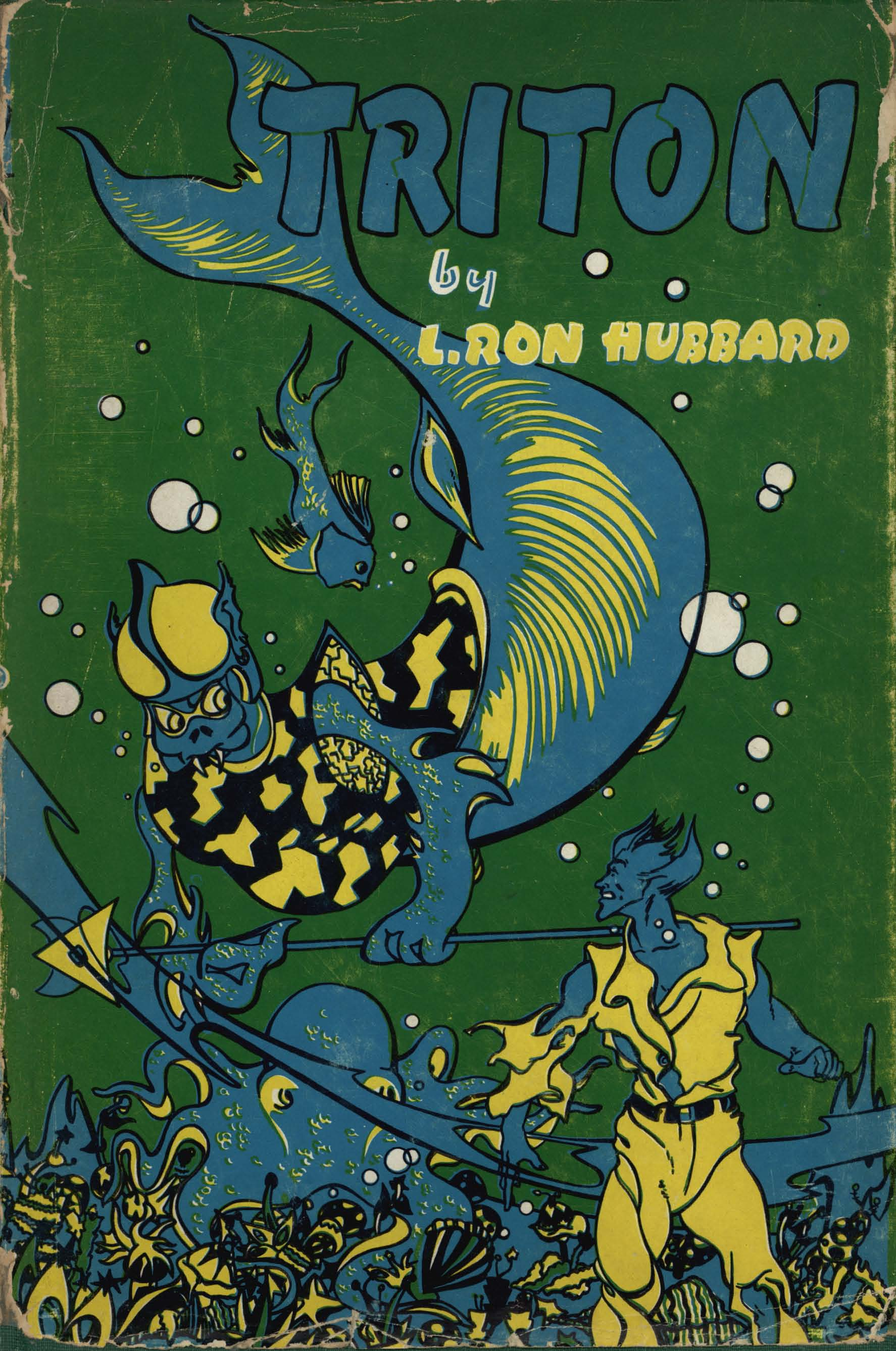
- Dust-jacket from the first edition
- Author: L. Ron Hubbard
- Cover artist: William Benulis
- Language: English
- Genre: Fantasy
- Publisher: Fantasy Publishing Company, Inc.
- Publication date: 1949
- Publication place: United States
- Media type: Print (hardback)
- Pages: 172 pp
- OCLC: 599631

Triton is a collection of fantasy short stories by author L. Ron Hubbard. It was first published in 1949 by Fantasy Publishing Company, Inc. in an edition of 1,200 copies. The title novella first appeared in the April 1940 issue of the magazine Unknown under the title "The Indigestible Triton" and under Hubbard's pseudonym "René Lafayette". The other story first appeared in the magazine Fantasy Book.

== Contents ==
- "Triton"
- "The Battle of the Wizards"
