= Ed Earl Repp =

American writer (1901–1979)

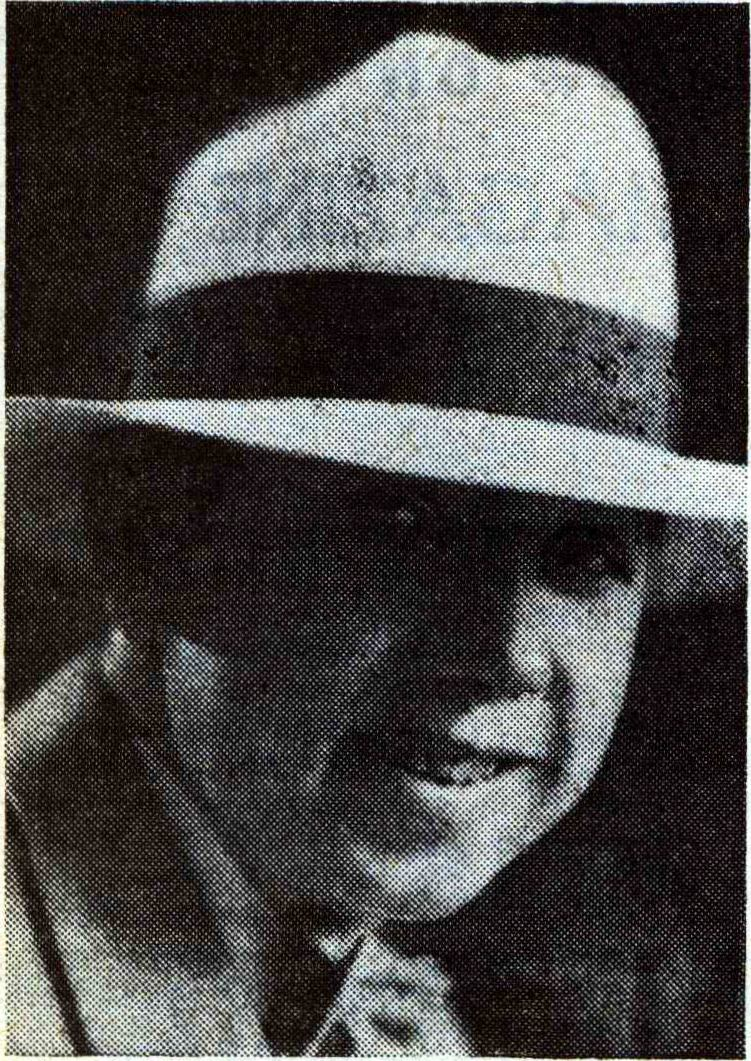
- Ed Earl Repp, from the October 1938 issue of Amazing Stories.
- Born: Edward Earl Repp; May 22, 1901; Pittsburgh, Pennsylvania
- Died: February 14, 1979 (aged 77); Butte City, California
- Occupations: Screenwriter; short story writer; novelist
- Writing career
- Pen name: Bradnor Buckner
- Genres: science fiction, western

Ed Earl Repp (May 22, 1901 – February 14, 1979) was an American writer, including screenwriter and novelist.

His stories appeared in several of the early pulp magazines including Air Wonder Stories, Science Wonder Stories and Amazing Stories. After World War II, he began working as a screenwriter for several western movies.

== Works ==
- Beyond Gravity (August 1929)
- The Radium Pool (1949)
- The Stellar Missiles (1949)
- Science-Fantasy Quintette (1953)

== Selected filmography ==
- The Man from Hell (1934)
- The Old Wyoming Trail (1937)
- Outlaws of the Prairie (1937)
- West of Cheyenne (1938)
- Call of the Rockies (1938)
- Saddles and Sagebrush (1943)
- The Vigilantes Ride (1943)
- Trigger Trail (1944)
- Terror Trail (1946)
- Gunning for Vengeance (1946)
- Galloping Thunder (1946)
- The Lone Hand Texan (1947)
- Guns of Hate (1948)
- Challenge of the Range (1949)
- The Pecos Pistol (1949)
