= The Dark Other =

1950 novel by Stanley G. Weinbaum

- Dust-jacket from the first edition
- Author: Stanley G. Weinbaum
- Cover artist: Jon Arfstrom
- Language: English
- Genre: Horror novel
- Publisher: Fantasy Publishing Company, Inc.
- Publication date: 1950
- Publication place: United States
- OCLC: 2322264

The Dark Other is a horror novel by Stanley G. Weinbaum. It was first published in 1950 by Fantasy Publishing Company, Inc. in an edition of 700 copies. The manuscript, written in the 1920s, was originally titled The Mad Brain. With permission of his widow, Forrest J Ackerman edited it, modernizing the manuscript to remove some of the "anachronisms" of the 1920s.

== Plot introduction ==
The novel concerns Patricia Lane who is in love with Nicholas Devine, a quiet and gentle writer. Devine undergoes sudden changes, becoming cold and calculating. Frightened by this, Lane consults psychologist Dr. Carl Horker, who rescues her from Devine while under the influence of one of his spells. Devine again attacks Horker, and overcomes him. He is then shot by Lane and rushed to a hospital where a second brain is discovered and removed.
