= Basil Wells =

American novelist

- Born: June 11, 1912; Springboro, Pennsylvania, United States
- Died: December 23, 2003 (aged 91)
- Occupations: Short story writer, poet
- Writing career
- Pen name: Gene Ellerman
- Genres: science fiction, fantasy western, detective

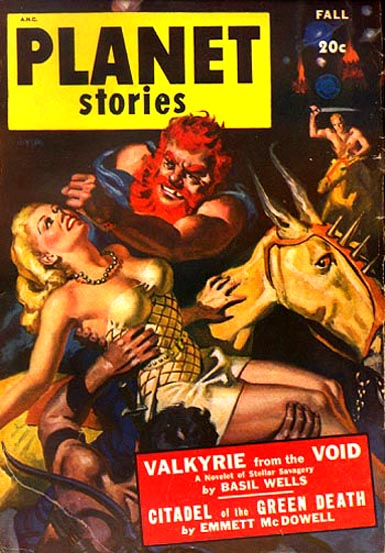
Wells's novelette "Valkyrie From the Void" was the cover story for the Fall 1948 issue of Planet Stories

Basil Eugene Wells (June 11, 1912 – December 23, 2003) was an American writer. His first published story, "Rebirth of Man" appeared in the magazine Super Science Stories in 1940. He wrote science fiction, fantasy western and detective stories for various magazines sometimes under the name Gene Ellerman. Two collections of his stories, Planets of Adventure and Doorways to Space were published by Fantasy Publishing Company, Inc.
