= Emil Petaja =

American novelist

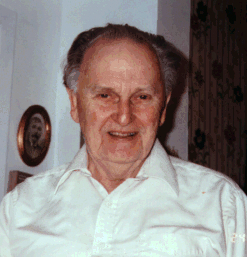
- Born: 12 April 1915; Milltown, Missoula County, Montana, United States
- Died: 17 August 2000 (aged 85); San Francisco, California, United States
- Occupations: Novelist; short story writer; poet; publisher
- Writing career
- Genres: science fiction, fantasy, horror, detective stories

Emil Theodore Petaja (12 April 1915 – 17 August 2000) was an American science fiction and fantasy writer whose career spanned seven decades. He was the author of 13 published novels, nearly 150 short stories, numerous poems, and a handful of books and articles on various subjects. Though he wrote science fiction, fantasy, horror stories, detective fiction, and poetry, Petaja considered his work part of an older tradition of "weird fiction." Petaja was also a small press publisher. In 1995, he was named the first ever Author Emeritus by the Science Fiction Writers of America (SFWA).

Of Finnish descent, Petaja's best known works are a series of science fiction novels based on the Kalevala, the Finnish verse epic. Petaja's series brought him readers from around the world, while his particular mythological approach to science fiction has been discussed in scholarly publications and included in related anthologies.

In a statement published in Contemporary Authors (Gale Research, 1984), Petaja commented, "My writing endeavors have mainly been to entertain, except for the factual material concerning Hannes Bok and fantasy art in general, which serves to indicate my enthusiasm for these subjects. My novels about the Finnish legendary epic Kalevala: The Land of Heroes spring from a lifelong interest in this fine poetic work. I own six translations of the Kalevala, as well as the work in the original. Both of my parents were Finnish."

== Early life and work ==
Emil Petaja (pronounced PET-a-ya) was born on April 12, 1915, in Milltown, Montana – a small lumber town in the western part of the state. He was the youngest of 10 children born to John and Hanna Petaja. The future author attended schools in Bonner and Missoula, Montana.

According to an autobiographical account, Petaja's introduction to fantastic literature came in 1931 when he came across a copy of Weird Tales. Reading the magazine changed his life, and he became a lifelong devotee of fantasy and science fiction. Petaja started out as a fan and immersed himself in the genres by befriending other interested individuals, by collecting pulp and science fiction magazines, and by forming clubs and associations. During this time, Petaja also struck up correspondence with, and sometimes befriended, such early luminaries as H. P. Lovecraft, Clark Ashton Smith, Robert E. Howard, and August Derleth. Notably, Petaja is part of a unique group of individuals in the history of the genres who turned their fandom into literature. He was also a member of First Fandom – a group which honors fans from the time when science fiction was known as "scientifiction." Petaja corresponded with Lovecraft in late 1934, and the next year proposed teaming with Duane W. Rimel to form a fan magazine, The Fantaisiste's Mirror, that would resume serializing Lovecraft's Supernatural Horror in Literature from the point it had left off in the defunct Fantasy Fan. However, the magazine never materialized. Petaja and Lovecraft continued corresponding until the latter's death in 1937.

The author's first published writings date from 1935 with the short story, "Two Doors," for the semi-prozine Unusual Stories. Another early work, "Weird Music" (written with Duane W. Rimel), appeared in 1936 in The Phantagraph. Other short fiction and verse was published in The Californian (alongside the efforts of Lovecraft), Futuria Fantasia, The Acolyte, and other small press and regional publications.

Much of Petaja's early literary efforts were verse – and according to the author, he won a "couple of minor regional poetry contests." In 1936, Petaja self-published a chapbook of poems, Brief Candle, running-off copies on the mimeograph machine at Montana State University, where he was a student majoring in creative writing. Brief Candle contained cover art and illustrations by Petaja's friend, Hannes Bok, whom he had met that same year. The chapbook marked the first book publication for each author. According to Petaja, approximately 40 to 50 copies were printed with many "given to friends and well wishers." Some of these early pieces were later collected in As Dream and Shadow (SISU, 1972). Other poems from throughout his career remain unpublished.

In 1937, Petaja moved to Los Angeles, California. There, he settled into the Los Angeles sci-fi scene, befriending Ray Bradbury – then still a teenager – as well as Henry Kuttner, Henry Hasse, Forrest J. Ackerman and others. Throughout 1937 and 1938, Petaja and Bok shared an apartment, and together they attended fan meetings, haunted second-hand book shops, went to the movies, and helped each other with their poems and stories.

In an autobiographical account, Petaja stated: "Perhaps when all is washed down over the dam, my major claim to fame will rest in the fact that it was I who got Hannes down to Los Angeles and I who dragged him, reluctantly, to the meetings of the Los Angeles Science Fiction Society. Where we met Ray Bradbury." "It was at Clifton's Cafeteria on Broadway. We couldn't afford to eat there, usually, but we took advantage of the free lime sherbet. In that fabled back room where so many of the s-f elite have sat around the long table chewing the fat, fanwize, Hannes first met Forrie Ackerman, Henry Kuttner, et al."

During the 1940s, Petaja continued to write, turning out dozens of stories for many of the pulp fiction magazines. A prolific author, his science fiction, fantasy, and weird fiction stories appeared in Fantastic Adventures, Worlds of Tomorrow, Weird Tales, Fantasy and Science Fiction, Future Science Fiction Stories, and elsewhere. One story, "Dinosaur Goes Hollywood," published in Amazing Stories in 1944, features a dinosaur on the loose of a movie set. Some of these early works were brought together in the author's only short story collection, Stardrift and Other Fantastic Flotsam (Fantasy Press, 1971).

Petaja also published under the name of Theodore Pine (Theodore was the author's middle name, and Petäjä is Finnish for 'pine'). As Pine, Petaja sold stories to detective and western story magazines of the period such as Crack Detective, Ten Detective Aces, Ten Story Detective, Mammoth Western, Western Action, and Western Trails. Many of these stories have evocative titles like "The Corpse Wants Company," "Good Night, Dream Bandit," "The Perfumed Peril," "Satan Hogs the Camera," "Bullets on the Downbeat," "Sixgun Serenade," and "Trigger Surgery." During the 1940s, Petaja unsuccessfully attempted to publish a detective novel. One of his last detective stories, "Stirred Ashes," appeared in The Saint magazine in 1967. Petaja had also been a member of the Mystery Writers of America.

== Later life and work ==
In the late 1940s, Petaja moved to San Francisco, where he turned his interest in photography into a profession. He traveled the state as a school photographer, and at times maintained studios in Sausalito and San Francisco, California. He was the house photographer for local theater groups, and wrote articles for magazines such as Popular Photography.

Having largely given up writing by the early 1950s, Petaja resumed literary work in the early 1960s. His first published novels were Alpha Yes, Terra No! (Ace Books, 1965) and The Caves of Mars (Ace Books, 1965). These works, like a number of Petaja's subsequent novels, were published as part of the paperback series of Ace doubles. As such, Petaja was published alongside emerging writers like Samuel R. Delany, Michael Moorcock, Brian Stableford, and Dean Koontz.

Petaja, being of Finnish descent, is best known for works making up a series based on the Kalevala, the Finnish verse epic. In each of the books which comprise the "Otava Series" – Saga of Lost Earths (Ace Books, 1966), Star Mill (Ace Books, 1966), The Stolen Sun (Ace Books, 1967), and Tramontane (Ace Books, 1967) – an Earth descendant of one of the four main heroes of the Kalevala is reborn into an avatar's role in order to re-enact adventures on Otava, the planet of origin of the Kalevala pantheon. The series brought Petaja readers from around the world; while his mythological approach to science fiction – an early example within the genre – was discussed in scholarly papers presented at academic conferences. In 1979, two omnibus editions of the "Otava Series" were published by DAW Books. A fifth novel in the cycle, Return to Otava (1970), remains unpublished. Another novel unconnected with the series but related to the Kalevala is The Time Twister (Dell, 1968).

The Green Planet books – Lord of the Green Planet (Ace Books, 1967) and Doom of the Green Planet (Ace Books, 1968) – recount similar adventures befalling its Irish protagonist, who finds himself role-playing Celtic deities for the benefit of a madman armed with instruments of coercion.

Other novels dating from the late 1960s and early 1970s include The Prism (Ace Books, 1968), The Nets of Space (Berkley, 1969), The Path Beyond the Stars (Dell, 1969), and Seed of the Dreamers (Ace Books, 1970). Four other novels remain unpublished, Glory Stone (1970), Little Gods (1972), Spin the Star Wheel (1975), and Zodiac World (1980). This latter work concerns a planet whose population is ruled by astrological beliefs.

As chairman of the Golden Gate Futurians – an informal club for writers and fans – Petaja hosted meetings for friends and colleagues at his home in the Castro neighborhood of San Francisco. Among the regular attendees were local noted authors like Fritz Leiber, Avram Davidson and E. Hoffmann Price. Writers and editors who might be visiting from out of town – such as Donald Wollheim or Harlan Ellison – would also attend and there have a chance to meet local figures like the Satanist Anton LeVay or the film maker Kenneth Anger. Petaja enjoyed the company of other writers and artists and was acquainted with a number of individuals who lived in the San Francisco Bay Area, such as Warren Hinkle (his upstairs neighbor), Anthony Boucher, Frank M. Robinson, Poul Anderson, Philip K. Dick and Robert A. Heinlein.

To date, Petaja's fiction has been translated and published in England, The Netherlands, Italy, Spain, Sweden, France, and Finland. In 1995, in recognition of a lifetime of significant achievement, Petaja was named an "Author Emeritus" by the Science Fiction Writers of America. The award was created "as a way to recognize and appreciate senior writers in the genres of science fiction and fantasy who have made significant contributions to our field but who are no longer active or whose excellent work may no longer be as widely known as it once was." As Author Emeritus, Petaja was invited to speak at the annual Nebula Awards banquet.

Petaja died of heart failure on August 17, 2000, at his home in San Francisco. He had suffered complications brought on from the treatment of a blood clot. After his death obituaries appeared in newspapers and magazines around the world.

== Emil Petaja and Hannes Bok ==
As a lifelong friend and collector of Hannes Bok, Petaja founded the Bokanalia Foundation in 1967, three years after the artist's death. According to a published statement, the foundation was set up "with the help and encouragement of Harold Taves of Seattle and Ray Bradbury of Los Angeles and the Golden Gate Futurians of San Francisco . . . . The avowed intention of Bokanalia is simply to keep the great imaginative art of Hannes Bok from slipping into oblivion, and to make new (better than pulp) prints available to his many admirers all over the world". Between 1967 and 1970, Petaja published three portfolios of Bok's art. Those portfolios include Variations on Bok Theme, (black & white portfolio, 1967); The Famous Power Series, (black & white portfolio, with text by Bok, 1969); and A Memorial Portfolio, (color portfolio, with booklet with text by Petaja, 1970).

Petaja also authored a commemorative volume, And Flights of Angels: The Life and Legend of Hannes Bok (Bokanalia Memorial Foundation, 1968). Along with brief contributions from Wollheim, Roger Zelazny, Jack Gaughan, and others, And Flights of Angels contains Petaja's long biographical essay on the artist, a checklist of Bok's published artwork and writings, and reproductions of a substantial number of drawings, prints and illustrations. Later, under the SISU imprint (and on behalf of the Bokanalia Foundation), Petaja published an illustrated volume of Bok's poetry, Spinner of Silver and Thistle (1972), as well as editing The Hannes Bok Memorial Showcase of Fantasy Art (1974).

== Emil Petaja and film ==
Petaja was a lifelong film buff and collector of movie memorabilia. He had a large library of film-related books, owned hundreds of 16mm films and videotapes, and enjoyed recounting stories about films and actors. Today, he is best known to film enthusiasts as the author of Photoplay Edition (SISU, 1975). This illustrated guide was the first book on the subject of photoplay editions, the movie tie-in books of the silent and early sound era. Petaja based the book on his personal collection, which at the time of publication numbered more than eight hundred books. As the author of Photoplay Edition, Petaja was a special guest at the San Francisco Silent Film Festival in 1998 and 1999.

While living in Los Angeles, Petaja worked in the labs at Technicolor, and wrote a handful of stories set in and around the movie capital. His interest in movies and film making continued through the years. Petaja made two short dramatic films, Dread Return in 1949, and The Call in 1950. These 8mm independent films, shot in San Francisco, utilized local actors and scenery.

== Books by Emil Petaja ==
- Brief Candle (1936) (poetry)
- Alpha Yes, Terra No! (1965)
- The Caves of Mars (1965)
- Saga of Lost Earths (1966)
- The Star Mill (1966)
- The Stolen Sun (1967)
- Tramontane (1967)
- Lord of the Green Planet (1967)
- Doom of the Green Planet (1968)
- The Time Twister (1968)
- The Prism (1968)
- And Flights of Angels: The Life and Legend of Hannes Bok (1968)
- The Nets of Space (1969)
- The Path Beyond the Stars (1969)
- Seed of the Dreamers (1970)
- Stardrift and Other Fantastic Flotsam (1971)
- As Dream and Shadow (1972) (verse)
- Hannes Bok Memorial Showcase of Fantasy Art (1974)
- Photoplay Edition (1975)
- Saga of Lost Earths and The Star Mill (omnibus edition, 1979)
- The Stolen Sun and Tramontane (omnibus edition, 1979)

== Sources ==
- Bailey, Robin Wayne, ed. (2005). Architects of Dreams: The SFWA Author Emeritus Anthology. Meisha Merlin Publishing. ISBN 1-892065-97-5.
- Clute, John; Nicholls, Peter, eds. (1999). The New Encyclopedia of Science Fiction. St. Martin's Press. ISBN 1-85723-897-4.
- Vahamaki, Borje (2009). Virtanen, Beth L. (ed.). Finnish-North American Literature in English: A Concise Anthology. Edwin Mellen Press. ISBN 978-0-7734-3818-7.
