= Stanton A. Coblentz =

American author and poet

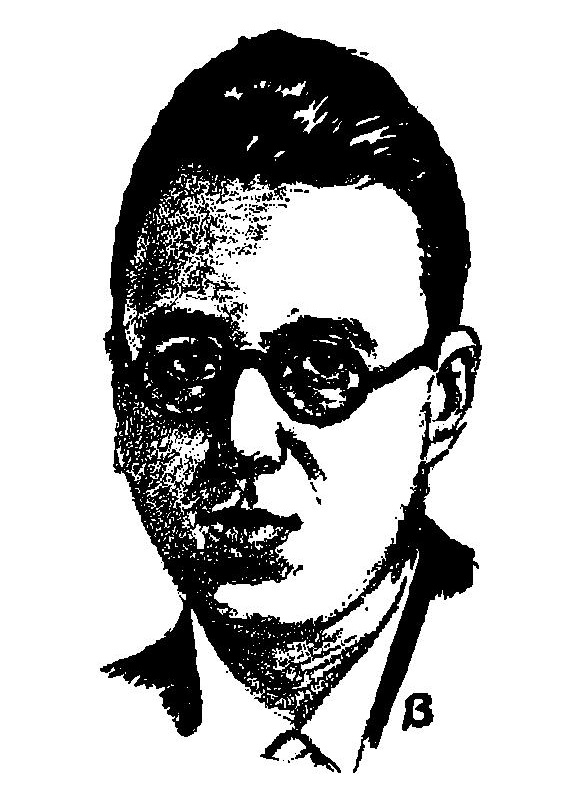
Stanton A. Coblentz, as pictured in the June 1929 issue of Science Wonder Stories

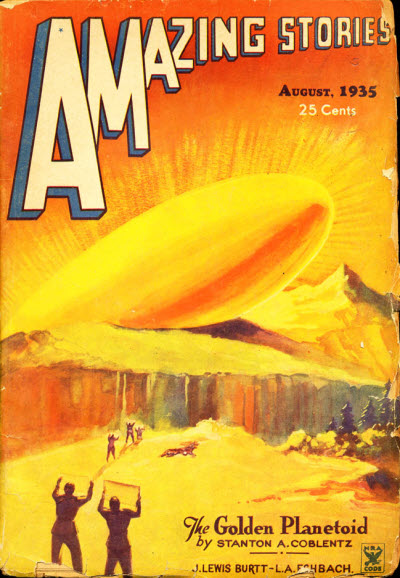
Coblentz's novelette "The Golden Planetoid" was the cover story for the August 1935 issue of Amazing Stories

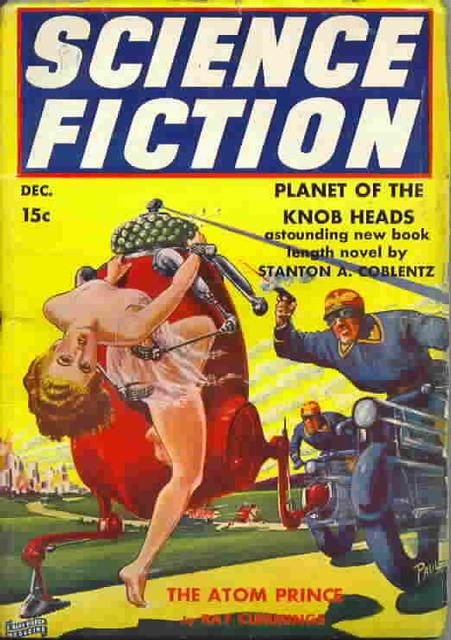
Coblentz's novella "Planet of the Knob Heads" took the cover of the December 1939 issue of Science Fiction, illustrated by Frank R. Paul

Stanton Arthur Coblentz (August 24, 1896 – September 6, 1982) was an American writer and poet. He received a Master's Degree in English literature and then began publishing poetry during the early 1920s. His first published science fiction was The Sunken World, a satire about Atlantis, in Amazing Stories Quarterly for July, 1928. The next year, he published his first novel, The Wonder Stick. But poetry and history were his greatest strengths. Coblentz tended to write satirically. He also wrote books of literary criticism and nonfiction concerning historical subjects. Adventures of a Freelancer: The Literary Exploits and Autobiography of Stanton A. Coblentz was published the year after his death.

== Bibliography ==
- The Decline of Man (1925) [non fiction]
- The Lone Adventurer (1927)
- The Literary Revolution (1927) [non fiction]
- The Sunken World (1928)
- The Wonder Stick (1929)
- Shadows on a Wall (1930)
- The Answer of the Ages (1931)
- In Caverns Below (1935, also known as The Hidden World)
- The Pageant of Man (1936)
- Songs by the Wayside (1938)
- Green Vistas (1943)
- Youth Madness (1944)
- When the Birds Fly South (1945)
- An Editor Looks At Poetry (1947)
- The Sunken World (1949)
- After 12,000 Years (1950)
- Into Plutonian Depths (1950)
- The Planet of Youth (1952)
- Times travelers (1952)
- The Rise of the Anti-Poets (1955)
- Under the Triple Suns (1955)
- Hidden World (1955)
- The Blue Barbarians (1958)
- My Life in Poetry (1959)
- Next Door to the Sun (1960)
- The Runaway World (1961)
- The Moon People (1964)
- The Last of the Great Race (1964)
- The Lizard Lords (1964)
- The Lost Comet (1964)
- Ten Crises in Civilization (1965)
- Lord of Tranerica (1966)
- The Crimson Capsule (1967, also known as The Animal People)
- The Poetry Circus (1967)
- The Day the World Stopped (1968)
- The Militant Dissenters (1970)
- The Island People (1971)
- Strange Universes: New Selected Poems (1977)
- Adventures of a Freelancer: The Literary Exploits and Autobiography of Stanton A. Coblentz (1983)
- Light Beyond (1989)
