= Mars Mountain =

Book by Eugene George Key

- Dust-jacket of the first edition
- Author: Eugene George Key
- Illustrator: Irving E.G. Bjorkman
- Cover artist: Irving E.G. Bjorkman
- Language: English
- Genre: Science fiction short stories
- Publisher: Fantasy Publications
- Publication date: 1935
- Publication place: United States
- Media type: Print (hardback & paperback)
- Pages: 142 pp
- OCLC: 11999899

Mars Mountain is a collection of science fiction short stories by Eugene George Key. It was first published in 1935 by Fantasy Publications. It is the first full length book to be issued by a publisher that specialized in science fiction.

== Contents ==
- "Mars Mountain"
- "Earth Sees Mars"
- "Lake Tempest"
