= Eugene George Key =

American novelist

- Born: August 5, 1907; Jackson, Mississippi, U.S.
- Died: February 1, 1968 (aged 60); V.A. Hospital Long Beach, California, U.S.
- Occupation: Short story writer/College Professor
- Spouse: Winifred Rachel Key [nee: Abrahall] (Sept 12, 1924 - Aug 27, 2010) Age: 85
- Children: Linford Eugene Key - 1944 - Mar. 2018; = Robert Ellis Key - 1945 - Mar 2017; = Jenifer Margaret Key - 1948 - Mar 2024; George David Key - 1950 - 2021; = Barbara Ann Key - 1952
- Writing career
- Genre: Science fiction/College textbooks

Eugene Key (August 5, 1907 – February 1, 1968) was an American college professor, lieutenant colonel, USAF, and writer of technical books for college students. His collection, Mars Mountain (1935) was the first full-length book to be issued by a publisher that specialized in science fiction.

Key enlisted in the United States Army Air Corps and was later transferred into the United States Air Force. During World War II, Key served in England, where he met, and married, his second wife, Winifred Rachel Key (September 12, 1924 – August 24, 2010). She was in the (Women's) Royal Air Force.

Key was an associate professor of engineering at East Los Angeles College. He received the degrees of B.S. in arts and sciences from Illinois Institute of Technology and B.S. in electrical engineering from Northwestern University.

Key was a licensed professional engineer, and had varied and extensive practical experience as an engineer and mechanical designer in private industry and for government agencies. He had the rank of lieutenant colonel in the United States Air Force Reserve, and while on active duty during World War II, he wrote and edited technical handbooks for the Air Force. He had published some twenty articles concerning technical subjects in Power Plant Engineering (now Power Engineering) and Design News magazines. Key was also a member of the American Society of Civil Engineers and Architects, the National Science Teachers Association, the American Society for Engineering Education, and the Los Angeles College Teachers Association, and was listed in The International Yearbook and Statesman's Who's Who, Who's Who in the West, and Who's Who in Commerce and Industry.

Two other books, by Key, are Elementary Engineering, McGraw Hill, 1960. PRINCIPLES OF ELECTRICITY, Barns and Noble, 1968 (3 weeks before he passed).

== Bibliography ==
=== Fiction ===
- Mars Mountain (1934)
- The Red Ace (1930)
- Lake Tempest (1934)
- Earth Sees Mars (1934)

=== Non-fiction ===
- Elementary Engineering Mechanics (1960)
- Principles of Electricity for Students of Physics and Engineering {1967}
