= Space marine =

Type of soldier in military science fiction

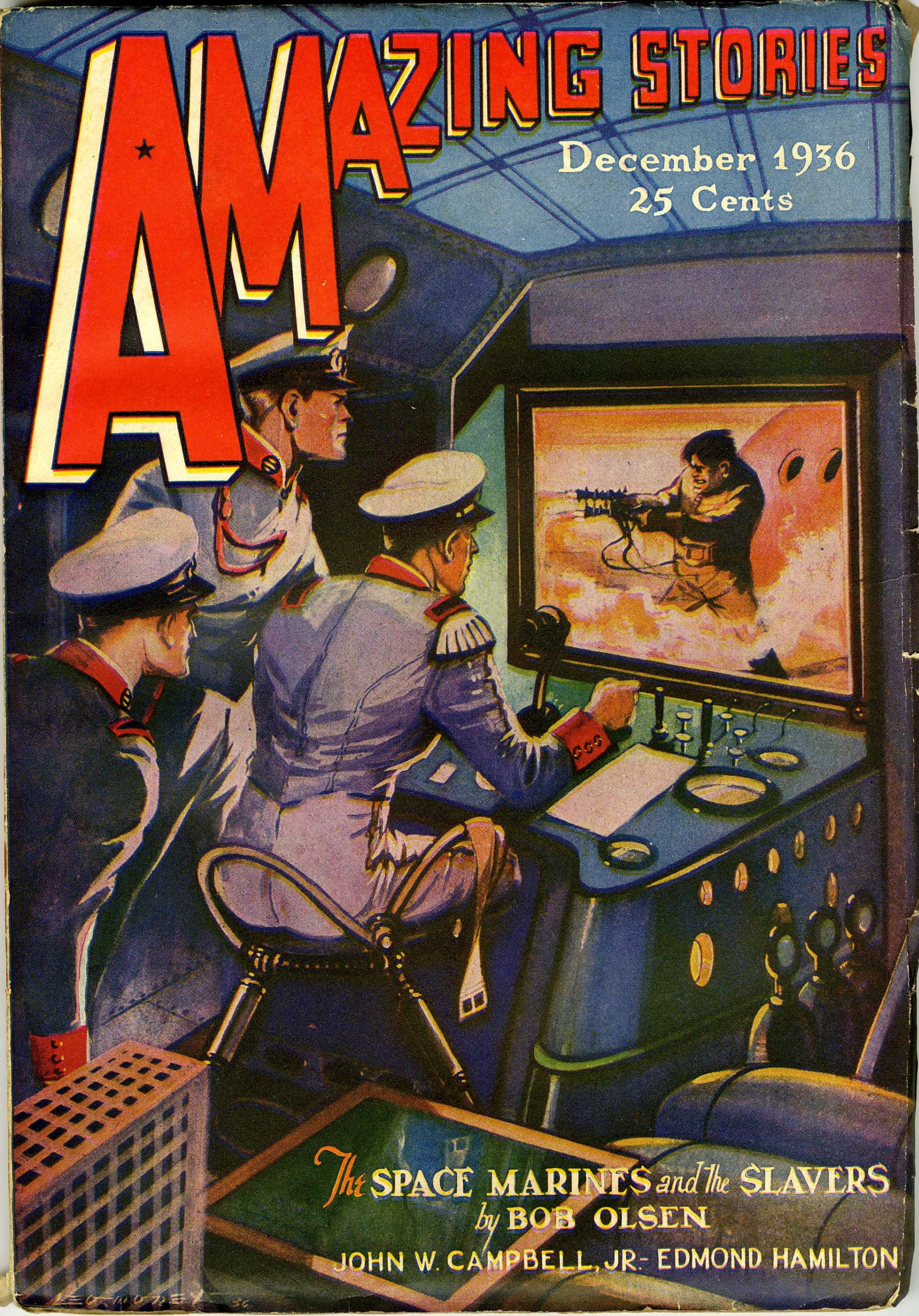
Amazing Stories December 1936, an early illustration of space marines

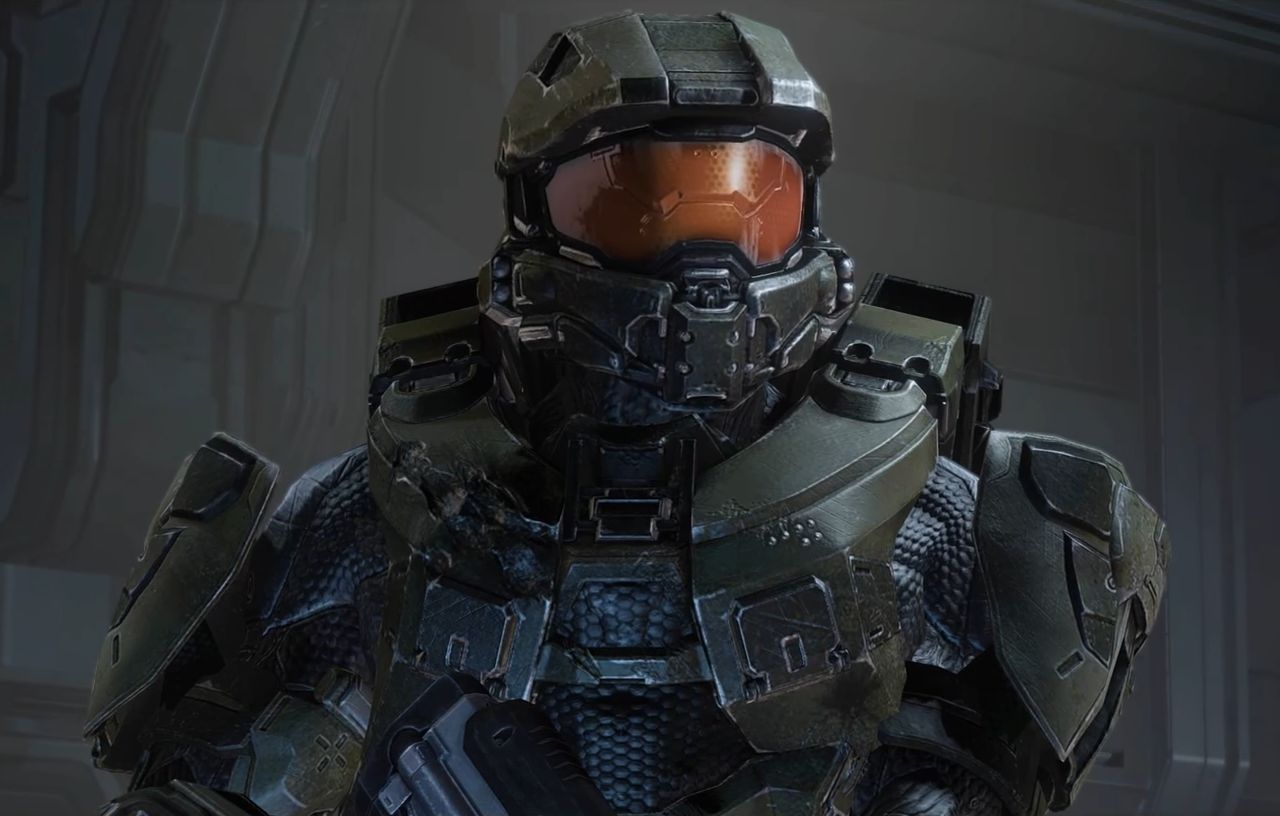
Master Chief from the Halo franchise is an example of this type of character.

In military science fiction, a space marine is a character archetype describing a technologically advanced spacefaring soldier. Fictional space marine forces operate in conjunction with a space navy or other spacecraft fleet, comparable to real-life overseas operations by watercraft-based marines or naval infantry.

== History ==
The earliest known use of the term "space marine" was by Bob Olsen in his short story "Captain Brink of the Space Marines" (Amazing Stories, Volume 7, Number 8, November 1932), a light-hearted work whose title is a play on the song "Captain Jinks of the Horse Marines", and in which the protagonists were marines of the "Earth Republic Space Navy" on mission to rescue celebrity twins from aliens on Titan. Olsen published a novella sequel four years later, "The Space Marines and the Slavers" (Amazing Stories, Volume 10, Number 13, December 1936), featuring the same characters using a spaceship with active camouflage to free hostages from Martian space pirates on Ganymede.

A more widely known early example was E. E. Smith's Lensman series. While the first story, Triplanetary and most later sequels (Second Stage Lensmen, Children of the Lens and The Vortex Blaster) do not mention them, passing mentions of marines are made in Galactic Patrol (Note: "Helmuth is after us, foot, horse, and marines.") (Astounding Stories, September 1937 – February 1938) and Gray Lensman (Note: "'Don't be a dope,' a captain of Marines muttered in reply.") (Note: "... have a boat-load of good, tough marines on hand ...") (Astounding Stories, October 1939 – January 1940), and a more direct mention is made in First Lensman (1950): "Dronvire of Rigel Four in the lead, closely followed by Costigan, Northrop, Kinnison the Younger, and a platoon of armed and armored Space Marines!".

The phrase "space marines" appears in Robert A. Heinlein's "Misfit" (Note: "The parade ground voice of a First Sergeant of Space Marines cut through the fog and drizzle ...") (1939) and is again used in "The Long Watch" (Note: "Space marines, arms reversed and heads bowed, stood guard around [the coffin]...") (1949) which expands on a story from his earlier novel Space Cadet (1948), in all cases before Smith had used the phrase. Heinlein's Starship Troopers (1959) is considered the defining work for the concept, although it does not use the term "space marine". The actors playing the Colonial Marines in Aliens (1986) were required to read Starship Troopers as part of their training prior to filming. Heinlein intended for the capsule troopers of the Mobile Infantry to be an amalgam of the shipborne aspect of the US Marine Corps relocated to space and coupled with the battlefield delivery and mission profile of US Army paratroopers.

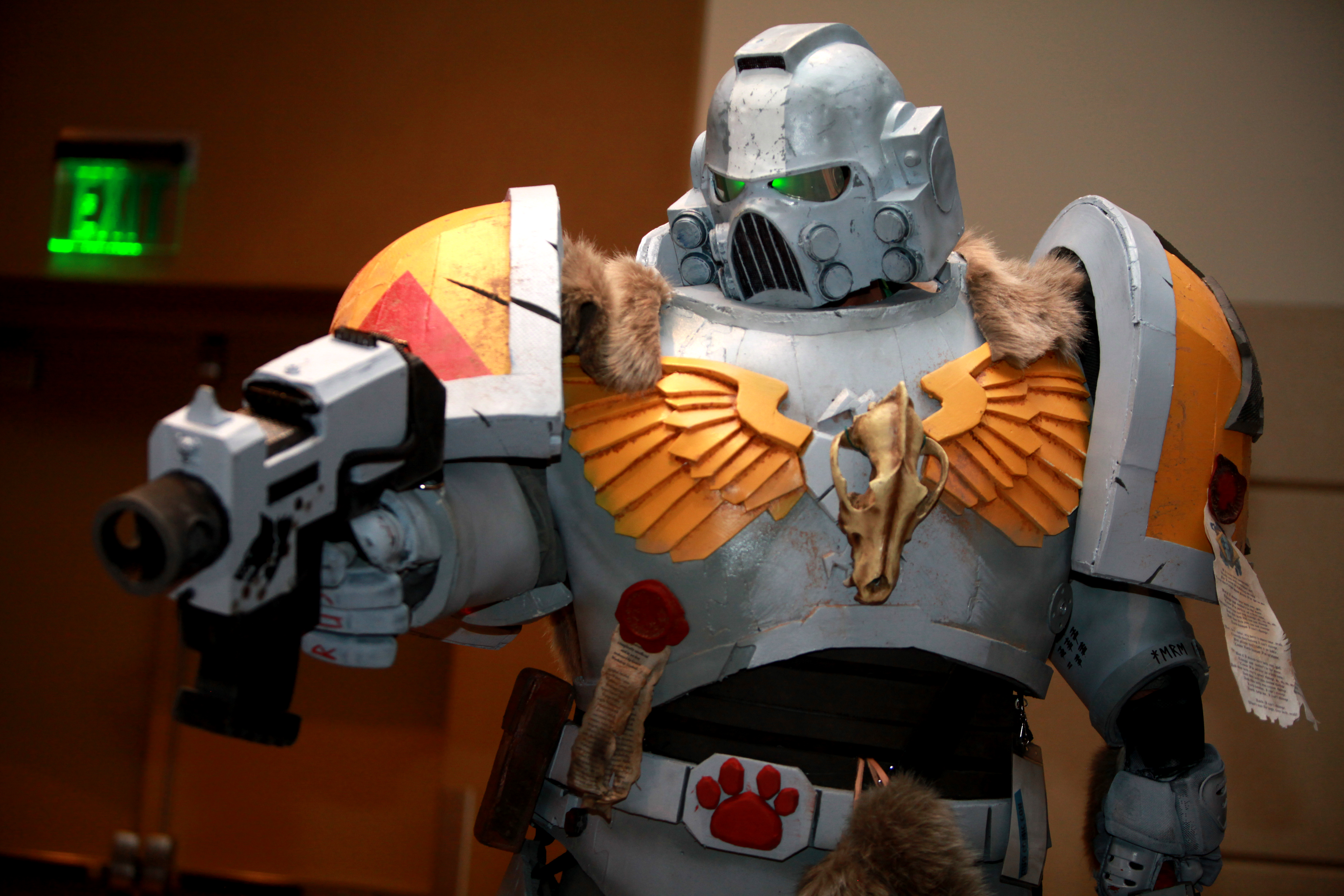
Games Workshop garnered controversy after claiming that the use of the term "space marine" infringed on their trademark.

As a gaming concept, space marines play a major role in the Warhammer 40,000 miniatures wargame universe, in which they are genetically altered super-soldiers and the most powerful fighting forces available to the Imperium of Man. In computer games, playing a space marine in action games was popularized by id Software's Doom series, first published in 1993. It is a convenient game back-story as it excuses the presence of the character on a hostile alien world with little support and heavy weaponry. Some critics have suggested it has been overused to the point of being an action game cliché.

In December 2012, online retailer Amazon removed the e-book Spots the Space Marine by M.C.A. Hogarth at the request of games company Games Workshop. They claimed the use of the phrase "space marine" infringed on their trademark of the term for their game Warhammer 40,000. In February 2013, the row received widespread publicity, with authors such as Cory Doctorow, Charles Stross and John Scalzi supporting Hogarth, and Amazon.com then restored the e-book for sale.

== Non-fiction aspects ==
The United States Air Force's Project Hot Eagle considers the use of spacecraft to deliver Marines to a target on the ground. Editors of the Defence Technology International magazine outline the aims of the project as follows: "Within minutes of bursting into the atmosphere beyond the speed of sound – and dispatching that ominous sonic boom – a small squad of Marines could be on the ground and ready for action within 2 hours."

== See also ==
- List of media featuring space marines
- Space force
- Supersoldier
