= The History of Civilization =

1961 novel boxset by Edward Elmer Smith

- Author: Edward E. Smith, Ph.D.
- Illustrator: A. J. Donnell and Ric Binkley
- Language: English
- Series: Lensman series
- Genre: Science fiction novel
- Publisher: Fantasy Press
- Publication date: 1961
- Publication place: United States
- Media type: Print (hardback)
- Pages: 6 volumes
- OCLC: 18892200

The History of Civilization is a boxed set of science fiction novels by author Edward E. Smith, Ph.D. It contains the six novels of Smith's Lensman series. The set was published in 1961 by Fantasy Press in an edition of 75 copies. Each volume was printed from the original Fantasy Press plates, but with a new title page giving the name of the set. They were bound in red half-leather, numbered and signed by Smith.

== Contents ==
- Volume 1 Triplanetary
- Volume 2 First Lensman
- Volume 3 Galactic Patrol
- Volume 4 Gray Lensman
- Volume 5 Second Stage Lensmen
- Volume 6 Children of the Lens

== Reprints ==
Old Earth Books reprinted the set in 1998 in a limited edition of 100 copies, bound in leather with a slipcase.
