= Lensman (disambiguation) =

Lensman or the Lensman series is a science fiction book series by Edward Elmer Smith

- First Lensman, the second novel of the series, published in 1950
- Gray Lensman, the fourth book in the series, published in 1951
- Second Stage Lensmen, originally published in four parts, November 1941 – February 1942

Lensman may also refer to:

- Lensman (1984 film), an anime movie based on the Lensman novels
- Galactic Patrol Lensman, an anime television series based on the Lensman novels
- "Backstage Lensman", a short story parody of the Lensman series by Randall Garrett, first written in 1949
- Lensman microscope, designed by Rick Dickinson
- Lensman (game), a game based on the Lensman novels
- Lensmann, a feudal title in Norway which today is used to describe law-enforcement position
