= Wolf–Lundmark–Melotte =

Irregular galaxy in the Local Group

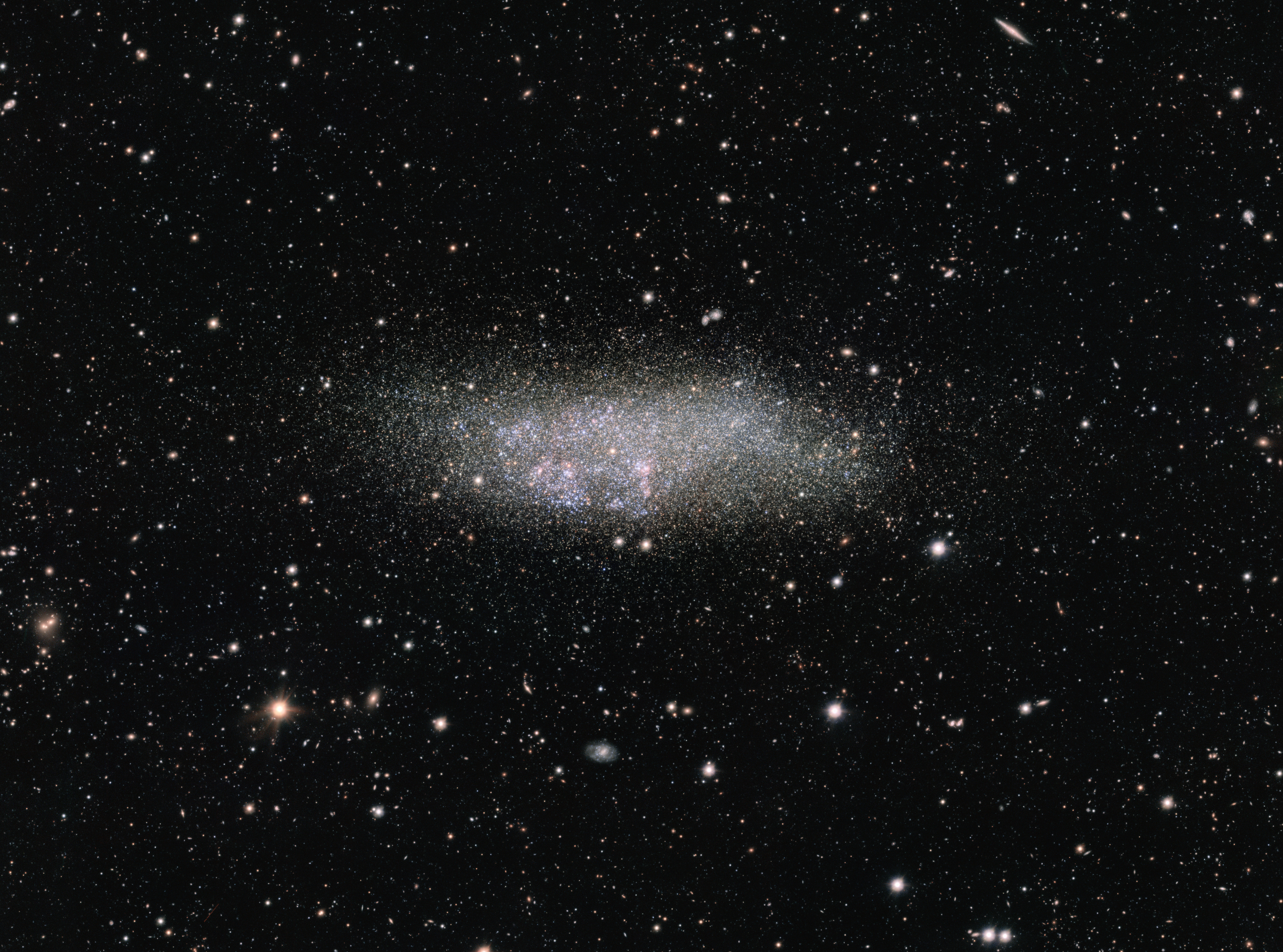
- The galaxy Wolf–Lundmark–Melotte (WLM), imaged by VLT

Observation data (J2000 epoch)
- Constellation: Cetus
- Right ascension: 00^{h} 01^{m} 58.1^{s}
- Declination: −15° 27′ 39″
- Redshift: −122±2 km/s
- Distance: 3,226 ± 88 kly (989 ± 27 kpc)
- Apparent magnitude (V): 11.0

Characteristics
- Type: IB(s)m
- Apparent size (V): 11.5′ × 4.2′

Other designations
- WLM, DDO 221, UGCA 444, PGC 143

The Wolf–Lundmark–Melotte Galaxy (WLM) is a barred irregular galaxy discovered in 1909 by Max Wolf, located on the outer edges of the Local Group. The discovery of the nature of the galaxy was accredited to Knut Lundmark and Philibert Jacques Melotte in 1926. It is located in the constellation of Cetus.

== Properties ==
Wolf–Lundmark–Melotte is a rotating disk that is seen edge-on. It is relatively isolated from the rest of the Local Group, and does not seem to show much evidence of interaction. However, the rotation curve of Wolf–Lundmark–Melotte is asymmetrical, in that the receding side and approaching side of the galaxy are rotating in different ways.

Although isolated, Wolf–Lundmark–Melotte shows evidence of ram pressure stripping. It is far outside of the virial radius of the Milky Way, so it is possible that Wolf–Lundmark–Melotte is currently passing through some relatively dense medium.

== Star formation ==
In 1994, A. E. Dolphin used the Hubble Space Telescope to create a color–magnitude diagram for WLM. It showed that around half of all the star formation in this galaxy occurred during a starburst that started ~13 Gyr ago. During the starburst, the metallicity of WLM rose from [Fe/H] ~ −2.2 to [Fe/H] −1.3. There being no horizontal-branch population, Dolphin concludes that no more than ~20 M_{☉} per Myr of star formation occurred in the period from 12 to 15 Gyr ago. From 2.5 to 9 Gyr ago, the mean rate of star formation was 100 to 200 M_{☉} per Myr. Being at the edge of the Local Group has also protected WLM from interactions and mergers with other galaxies, giving it a "pristine" stellar population and state that make it particularly useful for comparative studies.

WLM is currently forming stars, as evidenced by clumps of newly formed stars visible in ultraviolet light. These clumps are about 20 to 100 light-years (7 to 30 parsecs) in size. The youngest clumps are found in the southern half of the galaxy, which has more star formation.

In 2015, interferometric observations from ALMA detected CO in the low metallicity dwarf galaxy WLM revealed dense cloud cores. These results suggest that the CO clouds in WLM are normal in terms of density, pressure and column density, which explains why they lie on the standard correlations. They also appear to be marginally self-bound by gravity, suggesting that they are related to star formation. Their properties are typical for parsec-size molecular cloud cores in the solar neighbourhood.

== Astronomical objects ==
=== Globular cluster ===
WLM has one known globular cluster (WLM-1) at 00^{h} 01^{m} 29.5^{s} −15° 27′ 51″ that Hodge et al. (1999) determined as having an absolute magnitude of −8.8 and a metallicity of –1.5, with an age of ~15 billion years. This cluster has a luminosity that is slightly over the average for all globulars. The seeming lack of faint low-mass globular clusters cannot be explained by the weak tidal forces of the WLM system.

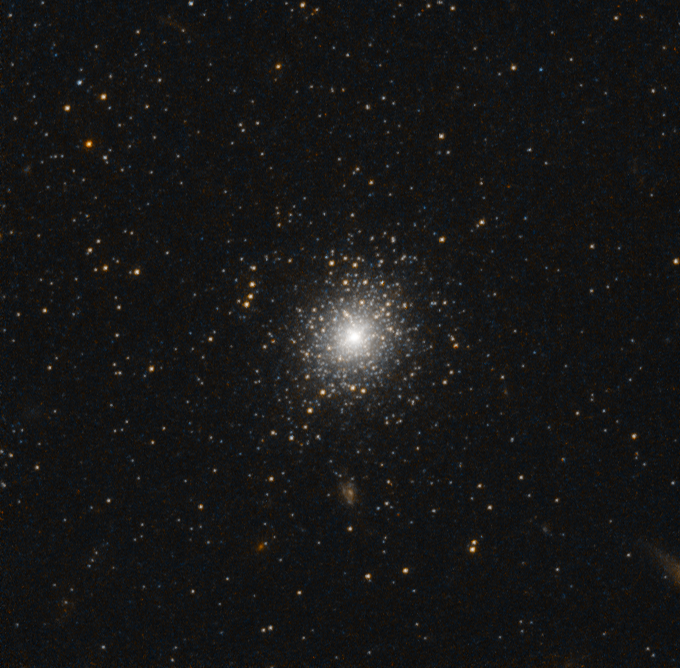
WLM globular cluster imaged by the Hubble Space Telescope

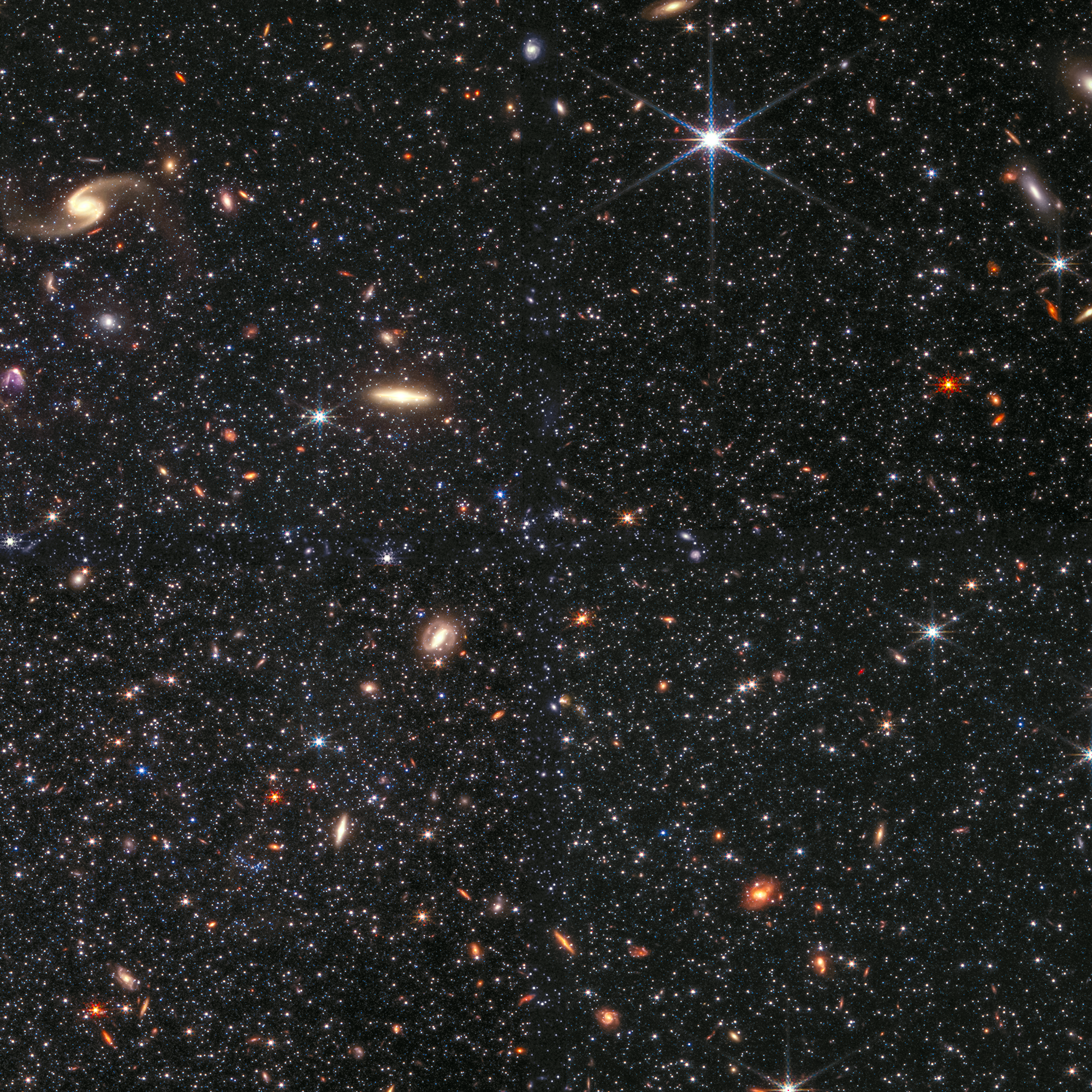
A portion of the dwarf galaxy Wolf–Lundmark–Melotte (WLM) captured by the JWST's NIRCam. Credit: NASA, ESA, CSA

=== Star ===
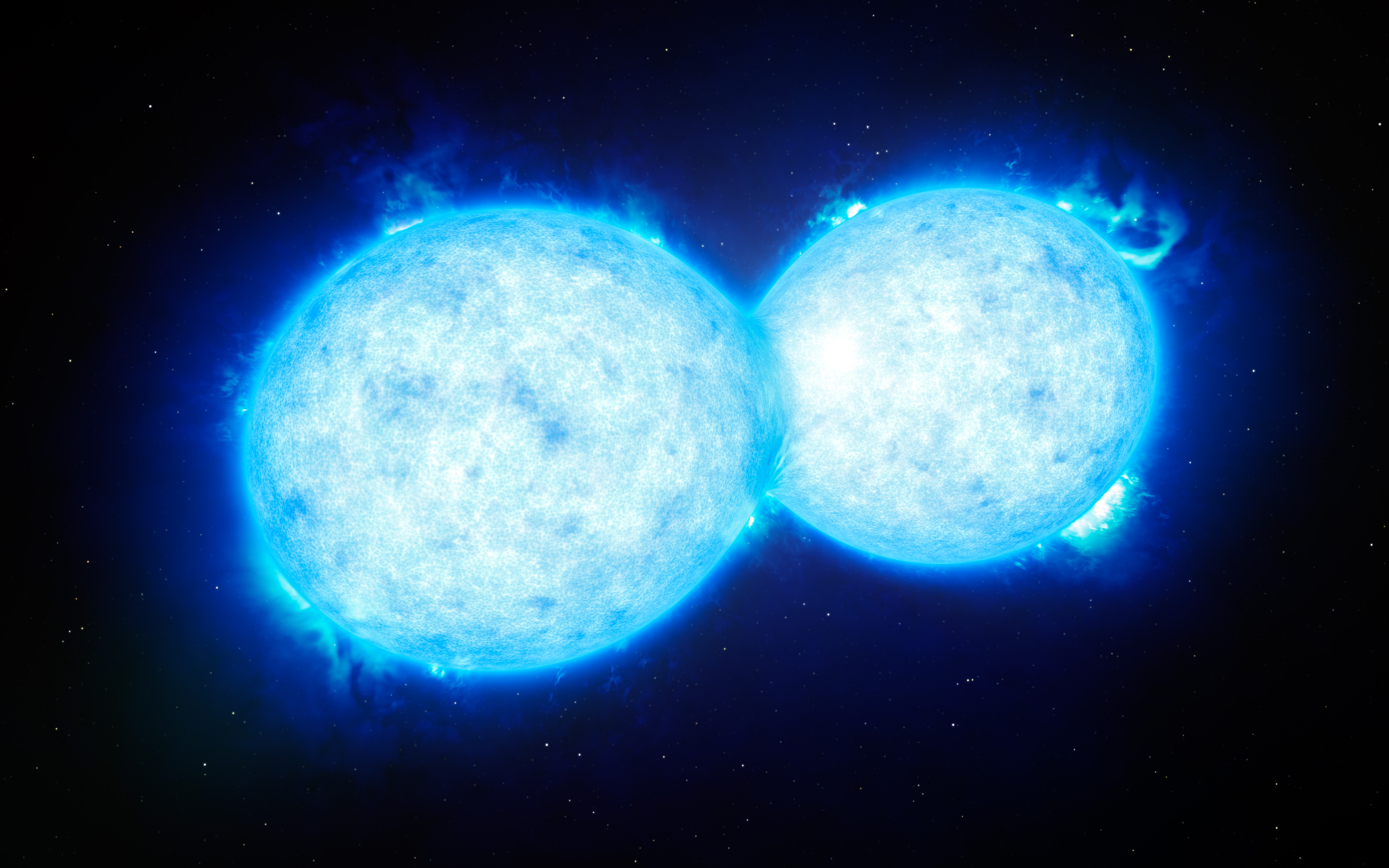
Artistic representation of contact binary star VFTS 352. WLM-CB1 is similar

WLM-CB1 is a massive candidate contact binary system identified in 2024 through archival time-series photometric observations conducted with the Hubble Space Telescope (HST) and the James Webb Space Telescope (JWST). It is notable as the first observed massive contact binary at a metallicity significantly lower than that of the Small Magellanic Cloud (SMC), with an estimated metallicity of [Fe/H] ≈ -1.85 (or 0.14 Z⊙). It is located at 00^{h} 02^{m} 00.23^{s} −15° 31′ 05.20″. The Primary companion (WLM-CB1a) has a mass of 16+2
−3 M⊙ and has a radius of 5.9 R⊙ and the Secondary component (WLM-CB1b) has a mass of 7+5
−3 M⊙ and has a radius of 3.9 R⊙.

== References in popular culture ==
In E. E. Smith's Lensman novels, the "Second Galaxy" is identified as "Lundmark's Nebula". However, some believe the "Second Galaxy" may not be the Wolf–Lundmark–Melotte galaxy, since the first chapter of the first novel in the series (Triplanetary) and the series-establishing material appearing at the beginning of subsequent novels states that the "Second Galaxy" and the "First Galaxy" (the Milky Way) collided and passed through each other "edge-on" during the "planet-forming era"—implying that the "Lundmark's Nebula" of the series must necessarily be obscured from view by the Milky Way; however, according to others, it could have passed through at an angle and thus be identified with the galaxy described in this article; some have stated that this is the galaxy that E.E. Smith was thinking of when he wrote the series. However, the distance to Lundmark's nebula is defined quite precisely in Gray Lensman as approximately 24 million parsecs, much larger than the distance to Wolf–Lundmark–Melotte (approximately 930,000 parsecs). Additionally, in Second Stage Lensmen multiple references are made to the spiral arms of Lundmark's Nebula. Wolf–Lundmark–Melotte does not possess such structures. At the time of writing of these books, the name of Lundmark was associated with such classifications and Smith may have elected to use this as a "believable" name for an entirely fictional galaxy.

At the time the Lensman series was written, most astronomers favored the tidal theory of Solar System formation, which required that planets be formed by the close approach of another star. In order to produce the massive numbers of planets necessary to evolve into galactic civilizations in both the Milky Way and Lundmark's Nebula, as portrayed in the Lensman series, E.E. Smith thought it would have been necessary for another galaxy to have passed through the Milky Way to produce the large number of close encounters necessary to form so many planets.

The Doctor Who novel Synthespians™ by Craig Hinton refers to the New Earth Republic of the 101st Century and beyond, which spearheads a programme of colonisation, sending sleeper ships to the Wolf–Lundmark–Melotte galaxy and Andromeda.
