= William B. Ellern =

American novelist

William B. Ellern (November 30, 1933 – November 18, 2023) was an American engineer and science fiction author.

Ellern was born in Portland, Oregon to William C. Ellern and May Eileen Ellern. He worked as an engineer, including for the Jet Propulsion Laboratory, Raytheon, Boeing, Hughes Aircraft and Northrop Corporation.

In July 1965, he asked for, and received, permission from E. E. Smith to extend the Lensman series of novels. After that he produced several science-fiction stories, including "Moon Prospector" (Analog Science Fiction and Fact, 1966), "New Lensman" (serialized in 14 parts in Perry Rhodan #61-74, 1975) and "Triplanetary Agent" (serialized in 6 parts in Perry Rhodan #100-105, 1978). There is also a fourth story, unpublished.

In 1976, the collection New Lensman was published, which contained "Moon Prospector" along with the "New Lensman" serial from Perry Rhodan. "Triplanetary Agent" has yet to be reprinted in book form.

Ellern served on the board of directors of the Los Angeles Science Fantasy Society until January 2009.

Ellern married Anne Morrel. He had four children, William A., Scott A., Gillian D. and Lorita E.
