= Sustain (disambiguation) =

Sustain is a parameter of musical sound in time.

Sustain may also refer to:

- Sustain (album), a 2007 album by ska punk band Buck-O-Nine
- Sustain (composition) a 2018 orchestral composition by American composer Andrew Norman
- Sustained (law), a ruling to disallow the question, testimony, or evidence, issued by a judge in the law of the United States of America
- SUSTAIN (military), a concept in airborne warfare
- Sustainment (military), an aspect of logistics
  - Sustainment (United States military)
    - Principles of sustainment, US Army doctrine
    - Sustainment Brigade, a type of US Army unit
- USS Sustain (AM-119), an Auk-class minesweeper

== See also ==
- Sustainability
- Sustainer (disambiguation)
- SustainUS, a non-profit youth advocacy group
