= 1937 in science fiction =

The year 1937 was marked, in science fiction, by the following events.

== Births and deaths ==
=== Births ===
- February 19 : Terry Carr, American writer and editor (died 1987)
- February 22 : Joanna Russ, American writer (died 2011)
- April 9 : Barrington J. Bayley, British writer (died 2008)
- May 13 : Roger Zelazny, American writer (died 1995)
- May 27 : Gérard Klein, French writer and editor
- September 19 : Jean-Pierre Andrevon, French writer

== Literary releases ==
=== Novels ===
- (in French) La Cité des asphyxiés, by Régis Messac.
- Star Maker, by Olaf Stapledon.
- Galactic Patrol, by Edward Elmer Smith.
- Swastika Night by Katharine Burdekin.

=== Short stories ===
- Travel by Wire!, Arthur C. Clarke's first published story

=== Comics ===
- (in French) Futuropolis, by René Pellos.

== Movies ==
- Night Key, by Lloyd Corrigan.

== Awards ==
The main science-fiction Awards known at the present time did not exist at this time.

== See also ==
- 1937 in science
