= Kinnison =

Kinnison is a surname. Notable people with the name include:

- Kimball Kinnison, fictional hero of E.E. Smith's Lensmen series of novels
- Terry Kinnison, a neighbor involved in the history of the 1992 siege at Ruby Ridge, Idaho
- William A. Kinnison, past president of Wittenberg University, Ohio
