= Sustainer =

Sustainer may refer to:

- Fernandes Sustainer, a guitar accessory
- God the Sustainer, the concept of a God who sustains and upholds everything in existence

== See also ==
- Sustain (disambiguation)
- Sustainability
- The Sustainer - House journal of the Royal Logistic Corps
