= Subspace Encounter =

1983 novel by Edward Elmer Smith

- First edition (publ. Berkley Books; Cover art by Mark Bright
- Author: E. E. Smith
- Language: English
- Publication date: 1983

Subspace Encounter is a 1983 science fiction novel by American writer E. E. Smith, a posthumously published sequel to his Subspace Explorers.

== Plot summary ==
The book describes two "spaces" that exist simultaneously in the universe, each of three spatial dimensions, and each occupied by human beings of roughly equal technological standing. The people in the two "spaces" have no awareness of each other, but each has developed faster-than-light transportation that relies on navigation through a fourth dimension that the two spaces share. Through their joint use of the fourth dimension, psychics (called "psiontists") in the two spaces become aware of each other, and meet to exchange technologies. The residents of one of the spaces use their superior weaponry and psychic abilities to help the residents of the other defeat a Hitler-like leader who plans to kill or enslave all those who do not belong to his "Garshan" race.

The book was published almost twenty years after Smith's death, and edited by Lloyd Arthur Eshbach.

== Reception ==
Dave Langford reviewed Subspace Encounter for White Dwarf #57, and stated that "one doesn't read Smith for literary graces, but this one is far inferior to the equally awfully written Lensman books because our hyperbrained Earthlings have it all too easy. Kim Kinnison used to suffer for his victories (eg erethism, amputation, infection with hideous alien fungi): this lot gets their on a plate."

== Reviews ==
- Review by W. D. Stevens (1985) in Fantasy Review, January 1985
