= M. C. A. Hogarth =

American novelist

- Born: United States
- Occupations: Writer, illustrator
- Writing career
- Pen name: Maggie de Alarcon, Micah Hogarth, MCAH
- Period: 1990s–present
- Website: mcahogarth.org

Maggie C. A. Hogarth (née de Alarcon) is an American writer and artist who works in the science fiction, fantasy, and anthropomorphic animal genres. The Internet Speculative Fiction Database catalogs her illustrations as by Maggie de Alarcon (1990 to 1997) and Micah Hogarth (1997 and 1998).

In May 2015, after working on SFWA's indie committee, Hogarth was elected Vice President of SFWA; she served in that capacity for three years before stepping down.

== Biography ==
Hogarth was born in the United States, the daughter of two Cuban political exiles. As of December 2013, she lives in Florida, US.

=== "Space Marine" controversy ===
In mid-December 2012, Games Workshop made a complaint to Amazon.com about Hogarth's novel Spots the Space Marine (a near-future military science fiction novel about real marines). Games Workshop indicated that the work infringed on their trademark of the words "space marine", and, as a result, Amazon blocked sales of the book.

This led to an internet backlash from commentators such as Cory Doctorow and digital rights group the Electronic Frontier Foundation, who questioned the right of Games Workshop to trademark the term. Subsequently, Spots the Space Marine reappeared on Amazon, and Games Workshop issued no further legal action.

== Honors and awards ==
Hogarth was a guest of honor at the Midwest FurFest furry convention in 2003 and 2009. She was also the guest of honor at the inaugural Son of SilverCon in 2023.

Her short story "Freedom, Spiced and Drunk" made the Tiptree Award's secondary reading list in 2002. Her short story "Unspeakable" won the Strange Horizons Reader's Choice award in 2002 and was a finalist for the Gaylactic Spectrum Award in the short story category in 2003. Her short story "In the Line of Duty" was the winner of the 2003 Ursa Major Award for Best Anthropomorphic Short Fiction. In 2004, her story The Flight of the Godkin Griffin was nominated in the Best Other Work category of the Gaylactic Spectrum Awards.

== Bibliography ==
Type	Genre	Title	Year
Collection	Science Fiction	Alysha's Fall	2000
Novel	Science Fiction	The Worth of a Shell	2010
Collection	Science Fiction	Clays Beneath the Skies	2011
Novel	Science Fiction	Even the Wingless	2011
Novel	Science Fiction	Pearl in the Void	2013
Novel	Science Fiction	A Bloom in the North	2013
Novel	Science Fiction	Mindtouch	2013
Novel	Science Fiction	Mindline	2013
Novel	Science Fiction	Dreamhearth	2017
Novel	Science Fiction	Dreamstorm	2018
Novel	Science Fiction	Family	2011
Novel	Science Fiction	Some Things Transcend	2014
Novel	Science Fiction	Amulet Rampant	2016
Novel	Science Fiction	Only the Open	2016
Novel	Science Fiction	In Extremis	2017
Novel	Science Fiction	From Ruins	2017
Collection	Science Fiction	Major Pieces	2019
Collection	Science Fiction	The Aphorisms of Kherishdar	2012
Collection	Science Fiction	The Admonishments of Kherishdar	2012
Novel	Science Fiction	Black Blossom	2012
Novel	Science Fiction	Kherishdar's Exception	2019
Novel	Fantasy	Flight of the Godkin Griffin	2012
Novel	Fantasy	The Godson's Triumph	2013
Novel	Science Fiction	Earthrise	2013
Novel	Science Fiction	Rose Point	2013
Novel	Science Fiction	Laisrathera	2014
Novel	Science Fiction	A Rose Point Holiday	2016
Novel	Fantasy	An Heir to Thorns and Steel	2015
Novel	Fantasy	By Vow and Royal Bloodshed	2015
Novel	Fantasy	On Wings of Bone and Glass	2015
Novel	Romance	Thief of Songs	2015
Novel	Romance	Cantor for Pearls	2016
Novel	Science Fiction	Healer's Wedding	2019
Novel	Science Fiction	Farmer's Crown	2019
Novel	Science Fiction	Heartskein	2020
Novel	Science Fiction	Fathers' Honor	2020
Collection	Science Fiction	In the Court of Dragons	2020
Novel	Science Fiction	Dragons' Fealty	2021
Novel	Science Fiction	Scions' Flight	2021
Collection	Science Fiction	To the Court of Love	2023
Novel	Science Fiction	Zafiil (FireBorn UnPainted)	2022
Novel	Science Fiction	Zafiil (FireDancer's Hand)	2022
Novella	LitRPG	Haley's Cozy System Armageddon	2022
Novella	LitRPG	Haley and the Catfish Invasion	2022
Novella	LitRPG	Haley and the Spooky Dungeon	2022
Novella	LitRPG	Haley and Nana's Best House	2022
Novella	LitRPG	Haley and the Miraculous Potion	2022
Novella	LitRPG	Haley and the Town of Refuge	2023
Novel	Science Fiction	An Exile Aboard Ship	2023
Novel	Science Fiction	Spots the Space Marine	2011
Novel	Fantasy	A Rosary of Stones and Thorns	2012
Novel	Science Fiction	Girl on Fire	2018
Collection	Science Fiction	Claws and Starships	2011
Collection	Science Fiction	To Discover and Preserve	2021
Collection	Science Fiction	Sleigh Bells and Starships	2023
Novel	Science Fiction	Second	2014
Novel	Science Fiction	Sword of the Alliance	2018
Novel	Science Fiction	Who is Willing	2017
Novel	Science Fiction	Either Side of the Strand	2015
Novel	Science Fiction	Faith in the Service	2019
Novel	Science Fiction	In Good Company	2022
Graphic Novel	Nonfiction	The Three Jaguars: A Comic About Business, Art, and Life	2015
Book	Nonfiction	Business for the Right-Brained: A Guide for Artists, Writers, Musicians, Dancers, Crafters, and All the Other Dreamers	2018
Book	Nonfiction	From Spark to Finish: Running Your Kickstarter Campaign	2012

In addition, short stories by the author have been published in Raconteur Press anthologies.
