= Subspace Explorers =

1965 novel by Edward Elmer Smith

- Dust-jacket from the first edition
- Author: Edward E. Smith
- Illustrator: Roy G. Krenkel (frontispiece)
- Language: English
- Series: Subspace
- Genre: Science fiction
- Publisher: Canaveral Press
- Publication date: 1965
- Publication place: United States
- Media type: Print (hardback)
- Pages: 278
- OCLC: 1234616
- Followed by: Subspace Encounter

Subspace Explorers is a science fiction novel by American writer E. E. "Doc" Smith. It was first published in 1965 by Canaveral Press in an edition of 1,460 copies. The novel is an expansion of Smith's story "Subspace Survivors" which first appeared in the July 1960 issue of the magazine Astounding.

== Plot introduction ==
It is essentially in three overlapping parts:

- A space catastrophe and its results
- The discovery and scientific study of psionics
- A war between the corrupt and shortsighted (including Labour, politicians, Soviet-style communists and greedy capitalists) and those who can see a bit further (mostly tradesmen, professionals, and businessmen).

The war is essentially an extension of the Cold War ongoing at the time of publication, extending into space, and ending with the total defeat of Communism.

== Principle of enlightened self-interest ==
The principle of enlightened self-interest is a philosophy that has existed for hundreds of years.

In the course of the book, Doc Smith extends this principle into an economic formula used for calculating profits and bonuses. After describing a deadly planet-wide strike, he discusses the ensuing development of this economic principle.

Capital must make enough profit to attract investors, and wants to make as much more than that minimum as it can. Labor must make a living, and wants as much more than that minimum as it can get. Between those two minima lies the line of dispute, which is the locus of all points of reasonable and practicable settlement. Somewhere on that line lies a point, which can be computed from the Law of Diminishing Returns as base, at which Capital's net profit, Labor's net annual income, and the public's benefit, will all three combine to produce the maximum summated good.

Later, he says:

Every employee, from top to bottom, received an annual basic salary plus a bonus. This bonus varied with the net profit of the firm, and each employee's actual ability.

== Reception ==
Charles R. Tanner reviewed the novel negatively, faulting in particular its primitive political slant: "Unless one is a fanatic far-righter, he gets pretty tired of this long before he reaches the end of the book. And Doc's widely known inability to get his hero into any real trouble is made obvious again and again".

== See also ==
- Incentivisation
- Meritocracy

== Sources ==
- Chalker, Jack L.; Mark Owings (1998). The Science-Fantasy Publishers: A Bibliographic History, 1923-1998. Westminster, MD and Baltimore: Mirage Press, Ltd. p. 133.
- Tuck, Donald H. (1978). The Encyclopedia of Science Fiction and Fantasy. Chicago: Advent. p. 398. ISBN 0-911682-22-8.
