= The Vortex Blaster =

1960 novel by Edward E. Smith

- Dust-jacket from the Gnome Press edition
- Author: Edward E. Smith, Ph.D.
- Cover artist: W.I. Van der Poel, Jr.
- Language: English
- Genre: Science fiction
- Publisher: Fantasy Press
- Publication date: 1960
- Publication place: United States
- Media type: Print (hardback)
- Pages: 191
- OCLC: 1508976

The Vortex Blaster is a collection of three science fiction short stories by American writer Edward E. Smith. It was simultaneously published in 1960 by Gnome Press in an edition of 3,000 copies and by Fantasy Press in an edition of 341 copies. The book was originally intended to be published by Fantasy Press, but was handed over to Gnome Press when Fantasy Press folded. Lloyd Eshbach, of Fantasy Press, who was responsible for the printing of both editions, printed the extra copies for his longtime customers. The stories originally appeared in the magazines Comet and Astonishing Stories.

In 1968, Pyramid Books issued a paperback edition under the title Masters of the Vortex, promoting it as "the final adventure in the famous Lensman series." While the stories are set in the same universe as the Lensman novels, they are only tangentially related. They reference events that happen in the Lensman series, but only “off stage”. No characters from the other Lensmen books show up in this book, though key characters such as Kimball Kinnison and Port Admiral Haynes are referred to. From the events spoken of in this book it apparently falls between Second Stage Lensmen and Children of the Lens.

== Plot summary ==
The hero of the book is Neal "Storm" Cloud. Although the story happens in the “Lensman” universe, he is not a Lensman, having failed his Lensman's exam. Instead he is a nuclear engineer with a mathematical mind. He is regarded as a intelligent individual and a quick mathematician. Present in his universe there are self-sustaining vortices of atomic energy. These are like a small piece of the heart of a star. A churning vortex of heat and light that slowly grows while consuming whatever it is in contact with. In theory they can be blown out by a precise amount of explosives, placed at an exact spot in the vortex, at exactly the right time. The conflict is, it takes the most advanced computers available hours to calculate the factors needed, and only seconds are available to get the correct amount of explosives on target. Additionally, if you try to blow one out, but don't get the factors right, all you do is split the vortex into many separate vortices and scatter them far and wide, and soon each is as dangerous as the original. Although Storm Cloud, being a nuclear engineer and renowned mathematician, should be able to calculate the factors and extinguish a vortex, but, in practice he can't. It would be very dangerous and Storm has a wife and kids, and putting himself in that kind of danger ties his mind up with worry so much that he just can't do it.

Then things change in a major way. Cloud's family is tragically killed when a misguided attempt to blow out a vortex lands one of the fragments right on his house. Devastated by the loss of his family, Cloud takes a leave of absence from the Radiation Lab where he works studying the vortices. As he drives he is struck with an idea for "blowing out" a vortex. It is slightly technical (Smith explains it so it can be easily followed), but the general idea is that Cloud's brain works so fast that he can calculate exactly where the center of the vortex will be at a moment in time and how big an explosive is needed, then hit it with a bomb that is set at the exact strength to actually extinguish the vortex instead of blowing it apart and making more vortices.

This works, and it makes Cloud a very popular guy. As it continues the book tells of Cloud's new job as the universe's one and only vortex blaster. This job takes him from planet to planet where he blows out vortices, matches wits against drug dealers and gangsters, meets new life forms, and acquires a crew for his small scout ship. His adventures are many and varied, and the lifeforms he meets are strange and interesting.

Eventually the Galactic Patrol decides that having only one “Vortex Blaster” is inviting disaster. If something happens to Storm Cloud, they are at the mercy of the loose vortices again. As a result, Dr. Cloud is called back to Tellus (what the Earth is called in Smith's stories) and given a new ship. A specially modified, light cruiser (called Vortex Blaster II ) outfitted to carry everything that is needed to extinguish vortices. He is also introduced to Joan Janowick, the leading computer expert of Civilization. Her job is to build a computer that can reproduce whatever it was that Storm Cloud does and blow out vortices like he can. Working closely with Joan on a series of ever faster computers, his eyes soon turn more and more toward his pretty, super smart, and self-taught psychic co-worker and his heart begins to heal. As they fall in love, he bonds psionically with Joan, a pivotal point in the novel, as this leads him to find and communicate with the pure-energy alien beings that have been unknowingly causing the problems. The original vortices are found to be the incubators that an alien species uses to breed and raise its young! That makes the Vortex Blaster an inadvertent murderer of children, a fact that does cause him anguish. In the end an agreement is reached, the aliens close down the "incubators" and move their offspring to vortices the Patrol has helped set up on uninhabited planets. As the story ends, "Storm" Cloud, the Vortex Blaster, is out of a job.

== Contents ==
- "The Vortex Blaster"
- "Storm Cloud on Deka"
- "The Vortex Blaster Makes War"

Dust-jacket by Edd Cartier from the Fantasy Press edition

== Reception ==
Galaxy reviewer Floyd C. Gale rated the book four stars out of five, stating that "while the modern trend of SF has passed good Doc Smith by" he still got "a huge bang out of this super-duper yarn."

== Sources ==
- Chalker, Jack L.; Mark Owings (1998). The Science-Fantasy Publishers: A Bibliographic History, 1923-1998. Westminster, MD and Baltimore: Mirage Press, Ltd. pp. 240, 308.
- Contento, William G. "Index to Science Fiction Anthologies and Collections".
- Tuck, Donald H. (1978). The Encyclopedia of Science Fiction and Fantasy. Chicago: Advent. p. 398. ISBN 0-911682-22-8.
