= Lensman (game) =

Lensman is a wargame first published in 1969. In Lensman, which was designed by Philip N. Pritchard, players explore, develop and engage in combat in a space setting based on the Lensman series. Upon its release, it was the first science fiction wargame to be available commercially. Lensman was generally praised for its gameplay, but criticized for its complex rules.

== Background ==
Lensman is based on the Lensman series of novels by E. E. Smith.

== Publication history ==
Lensman was first published in 1969 and was designed by Philip N. Pritchard. The second edition was released later that year by Spartan International. A third edition was released in 2010 as Phil Pritchard's Lensman.

== Gameplay ==
The game depicts a battle between Arisians and Eddorians on a two-dimensional space map. Players can explore the area, develop worlds, and fight. Combat can occur on strategic and tactical levels, the latter using rules developed from the Jutland (1967).

== Reception ==
An entry from The Encyclopedia of Science Fiction stated that the game was considered innovative upon its release, and criticized the rules as "somewhat arbitrary" and "densely written", but praised the game's significance that "lies in its historical importance to the development of sf Wargames," which included Triplanetary.

Scott Rusch reviewed Lensman in The Space Gamer No. 4. Rusch commented that "Although some of the rules are a little vague, the game plays well, if a bit slow, and it exploits the novels well enough to give you that 'you are there' feeling."

Marc W. Miller comments: "Lensman remained true to its inspiration, detailing interstellar battleships like the dreadnaught and the mauler, and showing us a space map with familiar star names strewn about. But on a deeper level, Phil Pritchard offered up an exhaustive treatment of the strategic economic wargame that had dominated the form for the 20 years prior to its publication. His was not only the first of the science-fiction wargames, it also laid the foundation for several distinct evolutionary lines of wargame design."

== Significance ==
It was the first science fiction wargame to be available commercially, and is considered an important influence for future games from that genre.
