= Star Smashers of the Galaxy Rangers =

1973 novel by Harry Harrison

- Cover of the first edition
- Author: Harry Harrison
- Language: English
- Genre: Science fiction
- Publisher: Putnam
- Publication date: 1973
- Publication place: United States
- Media type: Print (Hardcover and Paperback)
- Pages: 212
- ISBN: 978-1932100839

Star Smashers of the Galaxy Rangers is a 1973 comic science fiction novel by American writer Harry Harrison. It is a parody of the space opera genre and in particular, the Lensman and Skylark series of E. E. "Doc" Smith. The main characters are homages to Tom Swift Jr. and his buddy, Bud Barclay. It also includes a homage to Larry Niven's Ringworld (1970).

== Plot ==
Two college students, Chuck van Chider and his friend Jerry Courtenay, accidentally invent a device that can transport them through space, powered by a substance called "Cheddite", which is created by irradiating cheddar cheese.

Chuck, Jerry, their apparent mutual love interest Sally Goodfellow, and their janitor-turned-KGB spy Old John find themselves transported to Titan, a moon of Saturn, where they must contend with the native Titanians. Later, through a bizarre chain of events, they are flung into the far reaches of the galaxy, where they become involved in an intergalactic war that could change the universe forever. By the end of the novel, they have returned to Earth, where Chuck and Jerry are revealed as gay lovers.

== Reception ==
Science fiction writer Theodore Sturgeon, describing the novel as "a Tom Swiftian, gee-whiz parody of the very worst that our severest and most ignorant critics lay on us," concluded that "I love this kind of thing at short-short length."

Wayne Barlowe included the Garnishee of Star Smashers of the Galaxy Rangers as one of the alien species he covered in Barlowe's Guide to Extraterrestrials (1979).

== Sources ==
- Harrison, H. (1973). Star Smashers of the Galaxy Rangers. G.P. Putnam's Sons. ISBN 0-441-78361-9.
