= Galactic Patrol (novel) =

1937 novel by Edward Elmer Smith

- Dust-jacket from the first edition
- Author: Edward E. Smith, Ph.D.
- Cover artist: Ric Binkley
- Language: English
- Series: Lensman series
- Genre: Science fiction
- Publication date: 1937
- Publication place: United States
- OCLC: 1059230
- Preceded by: First Lensman
- Followed by: Grey Lensman

Galactic Patrol is a science fiction novel by American author E. E. Smith. The novel was originally serialized in the magazine Astounding in 1937. The stories in this volume were the first parts written of the original Lensman saga. It was later published in book form in 1950 by Fantasy Press.

Although portions of Triplanetary were written earlier, they were not originally part of the Lensman story and were only later revised to connect them to the rest of the series. First Lensman was written later to bridge the events in Triplanetary to those in Galactic Patrol.

== Plot synopsis ==
Galactic Patrol introduces Kimball Kinnison, who will be the hero of the next three books – Gray Lensman, Second Stage Lensmen and, to a lesser extent, Children of the Lens. Kinnison and Clarissa MacDougall are the penultimates of the human breeding program the Arisians set up many eons earlier.

The book deals with the earliest stages of Kinnison's career, starting with his graduation as a Lensman from the Patrol's academy. Organized pirates, known as Boskonians, have gained a great advantage with a new type of space drive, making their ships far faster than anything the Patrol can build. That is, with the exception of one ship, the Britannia. New and experimental, built to be the fastest thing in space, she has abandoned the traditional ray armament of a space ship for an offensive weapon much older – explosive artillery, fired at an opponent held in place by unbreakable tractor beams. Her mission is to capture a Boskonian ship of the new type intact enough to get the secret of her speed (hence the artillery, which the scientists of the patrol think can damage another ship enough to disable it without destroying the information they require). The experimental nature of her weapon means that she would be useless to a man experienced only in using the standard weapons of the time, so she is given to the inexperienced Kinnison to command.

Kinnison is successful in capturing a ship, but has to flee the converging pirate raiders. He tries to evade his pursuers and return the priceless information to Tellus (Earth). In the process, Kinnison finds and frees a previously unknown, mentally enslaved race (the Velantians) from their masters (the Delgonian overlords), making valuable allies and adding a new member race to civilization. He also destroys several pirate ships, completely frustrates the main villain, "Helmuth speaking for Boskone", and deduces the location of one of the pirates' secret bases.

Kinnison successfully returns to Earth in a captured pirate ship and is promoted to the exalted rank of Unattached Lensman. Unattached Lensmen (commonly called "Gray Lensmen" because their uniform is made of plain gray leather) are endowed with virtually unlimited power and authority. He immediately sets out to infiltrate what he believes to be an important pirate base. Unfortunately, Kinnison is in over his head and the telepathically capable "Wheelmen" who man the base discover and almost kill him before he can escape. While in the hospital recovering, Kinnison is assigned the pretty, but tough, nurse Clarissa MacDougall. He behaves badly and is rude and condescending to her, blindly lashing out because he blames himself for his abject failure with the Wheelmen. Kinnison, once recovered, goes to Arisia to learn how better to use his Lens. Kinnison is the first Lensman to be accepted for further training by the Arisians, and leaves weeks later many times stronger and with numerous additional capabilities. He is now a Second Stage Lensman.

For practice, Kinnison tries out these capabilities by infiltrating a Patrol base and trying to control the mind of a base member from a distance. After he reveals himself to the base commander, he is asked to judge a murder case that the local authorities have been unable to solve. He then reads the minds of the two accused men, finds which one is guilty, and using his mental powers, executes the culprit.

Using the information that Kinnison brought back about the new space drive, the Galactic Patrol quickly rebuilds its ships and goes out pirate hunting again. The Boskonians are being beaten back with the new ships when suddenly all their ships disappear from space. When they appear again, they have also been rebuilt and are now equal to the best that civilization has to offer. The bloody war goes on. Ships and men die, but neither side can gain a decisive advantage.

Kinnison locates the headquarters of Helmuth who "speaks for Boskone" and, with the help of the Grand Fleet of the Galactic Patrol, destroys it and kills Helmuth.

== Reception ==
New York Times reviewer Basil Davenport declared that Galactic Patrol was "far above the interplanetary cowboy and Indian school" because of "Smith's ability to create planets with truly original climates and inhabitants" as integral parts of his story. P. Schuyler Miller, reviewing the same 1950 edition favorably for Astounding, declared that "What John Ford is to horse-opera – Grade A, homogenized – Doc Smith is to space-opera."

== See also ==
- 1937 in science fiction

== Sources ==
- Chalker, Jack L.; Mark Owings (1998). The Science-Fantasy Publishers: A Bibliographic History, 1923–1998. Westminster, MD and Baltimore: Mirage Press, Ltd. p. 237.
- Brown, Charles N.; William G. Contento. "The Locus Index to Science Fiction (1984–1998)".
- Tuck, Donald H. (1978). The Encyclopedia of Science Fiction and Fantasy. Chicago: Advent. pp. 397–398. ISBN 0-911682-22-8.
