= SUSTAIN (military) =

US Marine Corps concept using suborbital point-to-point spaceplanes to drop troops

Small Unit Space Transport and INsertion or SUSTAIN is a concept first proposed in 2002 by the United States Air Force and United States Marine Corps to deploy Marines via spaceflight to any location on Earth.

Project Hot Eagle, launched by the Defense Advanced Research Projects Agency and the Air Force Research Laboratory, is an investigation into the development and use of suborbital spacecraft to fulfill this vision. Hot Eagle would use a craft based on a design similar to Space Ship One, which could launch a squad on a suborbital trajectory in two stages and deliver them anywhere on two hours' notice.

Delivery of soldiers by rocket has been proposed before, including by General John B. Medaris, head of the Army Ballistic Missile Agency in the 1950s. The lander itself is designed to hold a 13-man squad and land in almost any terrain at any time, avoiding diplomatic concern for airspace rights.

== See also ==
- Space marine
