= Lensman series =

1948–54 series of science-fiction novels by E. E. "Doc" Smith

Lensman
- Dust jacket from the first edition
- Triplanetary (1948); First Lensman (1950); Galactic Patrol (1950); Grey Lensman (1951); Second Stage Lensmen (1953); Children of the Lens (1954)
- Author: Edward Elmer "Doc" Smith, Ph.D.
- Country: United States
- Language: English
- Genre: Science fiction
- Publisher: Fantasy Press
- Media type: Print (hardcover and paperback); Audiobook

The Lensman series is a series of science fiction novels by American author E. E. "Doc" Smith. It was a runner-up for the 1966 Hugo Award for Best All-Time Series, losing to the Foundation series by Isaac Asimov. The fictional universe features many planets, intelligent species, and regions.

== Plot ==
The series begins with Triplanetary, beginning two billion years before the present time and continuing into the near future. The universe has no life-forms aside from the ancient Arisians, and few planets besides the Arisians' native world. The peaceful Arisians have foregone physical skills in order to develop contemplative mental power. The underlying assumption for this series, based on theories of stellar evolution extant at the time of the books' writing, is that planets form only rarely, and therefore our First and Second Galaxies, with their many billions of planets, are unique.

The Eddorians, a dictatorial, power-hungry race, come into our universe from an alien space-time continuum after observing that our galaxy and a sister galaxy (the Second Galaxy) are passing through each other. This will result in the formation of billions of planets and the development of life upon some of them. Dominance over these life forms would offer the Eddorians an opportunity to satisfy their lust for power and control.

Although the Eddorians have developed mental powers almost equal to those of the Arisians, they rely instead for the most part on physical power, which has come to be exercised on their behalf by a hierarchy of underling races. They see the many races in the universe, with which the Arisians were intending to build a peaceful civilization, as fodder for their power drive.

The Arisians detect the Eddorians' invasion of our universe and realize that the two races are too evenly matched for either to destroy the other without being destroyed themselves. The Eddorians do not detect the Arisians, who begin a covert breeding program on every world that can produce intelligent life, with particular emphasis on the four planets: Earth (Tellus), Velantia III, Rigel IV, and Palain VII, in the hope of creating a race that is capable of destroying the Eddorians.

Triplanetary incorporates the early history of that breeding program on Earth, illustrated with the lives of several warriors and soldiers, from ancient times to the discovery of the first interstellar space drive. It adds an additional short novel (originally published with the Triplanetary name) which is transitional to the novel First Lensman. It details some of the interactions and natures of two distinct breeding lines, one bearing some variant of the name "Kinnison", and another distinguished by possessing "red-bronze-auburn hair and gold-flecked, tawny eyes". The two lines do not co-mingle until the Arisian breeding plan brings them together.

The second book, First Lensman, concerns the early formation of the Galactic Patrol and the first Lens, given to First Lensman Virgil Samms of "Tellus" (Earth). Samms and Roderick Kinnison are members of the two breeding lines and they are both natural leaders, intelligent, forceful, and capable. The Arisians make it known that if Samms, the head of the Triplanetary Service, visits the Arisian planetary system he will be given the tool he needs to build the Galactic Patrol. That tool is the Lens. The Arisians further promise him that no entity unworthy of the Lens will ever be permitted to wear it, but that he and his successors will have to discover for themselves most of its abilities.

The Lens gives its wearer a variety of mental capabilities, including those needed to enforce the law on alien planets, and to bridge the communication gap between different life-forms. It can provide mind-reading and telepathic abilities. It cannot be worn by anyone other than its owner, will kill any other wearer, and even a brief touch is extremely painful.

Using the Lens as a means to test mental qualities and identify individuals able to help him, Virgil Samms visits races and species in other star systems, recruiting the best of them and forming the nucleus of a Galactic Patrol. Their opponents are discovered to be a widespread civilization based on dominance hierarchies and using organized crime to assume control of new planets.

The series contains some of the largest-scale space battles ever written. Entire worlds are almost casually destroyed. Huge fleets of spaceships fight bloody wars of attrition. Alien races of two galaxies sort themselves into the allied, Lens-bearing adherents of "Civilization" and the enemy "Boskone".

Centuries pass, and eventually the final generations of the breeding program are born. On each of the four "best" planets, a single individual realizes the limits of his Arisian training and perceives the need to return to seek "second stage" training, which, it is later shown, include the ability to slay by mental force alone; a "sense of perception" which allows seeing by direct awareness without the use of the visual sense; the ability to control minds undetectably, including the ability to alter memories untraceably; the ability to perfectly split attention in order to perform multiple tasks with simultaneous focus on each; and the ability to better integrate their minds for superior thinking.

As the breeding program nears its conclusion, humans are selected as the best choice; at the same time, the breeding programs of the other three planets are terminated, and their penultimates never meet their planned mates. Kimball Kinnison meets and marries the product of the complementary human breeding program, Clarrissa MacDougall. She is a beautiful, curvaceous, red-haired nurse, who eventually becomes the first human female to receive her own Lens. Their children, a boy and two pairs of twin sisters, grow up to be the five Children of the Lens. In their breeding, "almost every strain of weakness in humanity is finally removed". They are born already possessing the powers taught to second-stage Lensmen. They are the only beings of Civilization ever to see Arisia as it truly is, and the only individuals developed over all the existence of billions of years able finally to penetrate the Eddorians' defense screens.

After undergoing advanced training, they are described as "third-stage" Lensmen, transcending humanity with mental scope and perceptions impossible for any normal person. Although newly adult, they are now expected to be more competent than the Arisians and to develop their own techniques and abilities "about which we [the Arisians] know nothing".

The key discovery comes when they try mind-merging. They discover they can merge their minds to effectively form one mental entity called the Unit. The Arisians describe this as the "most nearly perfect creation the universe has ever seen" and state that they, who created it, are themselves almost entirely ignorant of its powers.

The Children of the Lens, together with the mental power of unknown millions of Lensmen of the Galactic Patrol, constitute the Arisians' intended means to destroy the Eddorians and make the universe safe for Civilization. The Galactic Patrol, summoned to work together in this way for the first time, contains billions of beings who in total can generate immense mental force. The Arisians add their own tremendous mental force to this. The Unit focuses the accumulated power onto one tiny point of the Eddorians' shields. The Eddorian shields are destroyed along with the Eddorian High Council. It is stated that this was the only thing the Arisians could not have done by themselves, but without its accomplishment the Eddorians would have eventually turned the tide and beaten the Arisians.

The Arisians remove themselves from the Cosmos in order to leave the Children of the Lens uninhibited in their future as the new guardians of Civilization.

== Publication history ==
Originally, the series consisted of the four novels Galactic Patrol, Gray Lensman, Second Stage Lensmen, and Children of the Lens, published between 1937 and 1948 in the magazine Astounding Stories (retitled Astounding Science Fiction in March 1938). In 1948, at the suggestion of Lloyd Arthur Eshbach (publisher of the original editions of the Lensman books as part of the Fantasy Press imprint), Smith rewrote his 1934 story Triplanetary to fit in with the Lensman series. First Lensman was written in 1950 to act as a link between Triplanetary and Galactic Patrol and finally, in the years up to 1954, Smith revised the rest of the series to remove inconsistencies between the original Lensman chronology and Triplanetary.

Except for the two prequel novels, the stories first appeared as serials, almost all of which were serialized under the editorship of John W. Campbell. They were later collected and reworked into the better-known series of books. The complete series in narrative sequence with original publication dates is as follows.

1. Triplanetary (1948, originally published in four parts, January–April 1934, in Amazing Stories)
2. First Lensman (1950, Fantasy Press)
3. Galactic Patrol (1950, originally published in six parts, September 1937 – February 1938, in Astounding Stories)
4. Grey Lensman (1951, originally published in four parts, October 1939 – January 1940, Astounding Science Fiction)
5. Second Stage Lensmen (1953, originally published in four parts, November 1941 – February 1942, Astounding Science Fiction)
6. Children of the Lens (1954, originally published in four parts, November 1947 – February 1948, Astounding Science Fiction)

Side stories
The Vortex Blaster (1960, republished as Masters of the Vortex in 1968)

== Sequels ==
Using the same fictional universe, but not concerning the central plot, Smith wrote the Vortex Blaster stories, including "Storm Cloud on Deka" (June 1942) and "The Vortex Blaster Makes War" (October 1942) for Comet Stories, but the magazine closed after publishing Vortex Blaster (July 1941) and the rest were first published in Astonishing Stories. These stories and later additions were collected and published by Gnome Press as The Vortex Blaster in 1960 and later reprinted by Pyramid Books as Masters of the Vortex in 1968. They are set in the time between Second Stage Lensman and Children of the Lens.

In "Larger Than Life", a tribute to Smith written by Robert A. Heinlein and included in Expanded Universe, Heinlein writes:

The Lensman [series] was left unfinished. There was to have been at least a seventh volume. As always, Doc had worked it out in great detail, but never (so far as I know) wrote it down ... because it was unpublishable—then. But he told me the ending orally and in private. I shan't repeat it; it is not my story. Possibly somewhere there is a manuscript—I hope so! All I will say is that the ending develops by inescapable logic from clues in Children of the Lens.

On July 14, 1965, Smith gave written permission to William B. Ellern to continue the Lensman series, which led to the publishing of "Moon Prospector" in 1966, New Lensman in 1975, which contained "Moon Prospector", and Triplanetary Agent in 1978.

Three additional Lensmen novels that feature the alien Second-Stage Lensmen, known as the Second-Stage Lensman Trilogy, were written by David Kyle, published in paperback between 1980 and 1983 and reissued in 2004:

- The Dragon Lensman (Worsel, the Velantian)
- Lensman from Rigel (Tregonsee, the Rigellian)
- Z-Lensman (Nadreck the Palainian)
- A fourth novel, which was to have told the story of the Red Lensman, was discussed, but never completed.

The events in these books take place between Second-Stage Lensmen and Children of the Lens and refer to events and characters in Vortex Blaster.

== Adaptations ==
=== Lensman (1984 film) ===
Lensman: Secret of the Lens (SF新世紀レンズマン, SF Shinseiki Renzuman) is a 1984 Japanese animated film based on the Lensman novels. The movie is a loose adaptation of the series. It was dubbed by Harmony Gold in 1988. This was re-dubbed by Streamline Pictures in 1990 with most of the same voice actors.

=== Galactic Patrol Lensman ===
Galactic Patrol Lensman (GALACTIC PATROL レンズマン) is a Japanese anime television series based on the Lensman novels. The 25-episode series aired from October 6, 1984 to August 8, 1985 in Japan.

=== Comics ===
==== In Japan ====
Both the 1984 long-running theatrical animation and the animated TV series were adapted into manga. The movie's adaptation was created by Moribi Murano and divided into three volumes. The TV series adaptation by Mitsuru Miura was serialized in Weekly Shōnen Magazine and then reprinted in three tankōbon pocket volumes. No English translation of these two manga has been published so far.

==== Eternity Comics (1990–1991) ====
Initially, Eternity's Lensman comics run consisted almost entirely of adaptations of the Lensman TV episodes, but they also began writing additional material.

- Lensman: The Secret of the Lens

Six issues, written by Paul O'Conner, drawn by Tim Eldred, ink by Paul Young, cover art by Jason Waltrip.

- Lensman: War of the Galaxies

Seven issues, written by Paul O'Conner and drawn and inks by Tim Eldred.

- Lensman: Galactic Patrol

Five issues, written by Tim Eldred, drawn by Tim Eldred and inks by Paul Young and Ken Branch.

=== Film ===
In 2008, Ron Howard's Imagine Entertainment and Universal Pictures began negotiations with the author's estate for rights to film the Lensman series. The negotiations were for an 18-month renewable option. At the WonderCon convention in San Francisco in February, J. Michael Straczynski, the creator of Babylon 5, confirmed that Howard had acquired the rights and also hinted that he was involved in the project. Although the work on the project began that June, Straczynski later wrote in April 2014 that Universal had scrapped the project, citing excessive cost, and that the rights had reverted to the estate.

=== Games ===
The series has been adapted into the board war games Lensman and Triplanetary. The first of these was designed by Philip N. Pritchard.

GURPS Lensman: Starkly Astounding Space-Opera Adventure for the GURPS roleplaying system was produced in 1993 by Steve Jackson Games.

== Homages and parodies ==
With Smith's knowledge, the parody "Backstage Lensman" was written by Randall Garrett in 1949. Garrett also referred to the Lenses in his Lord Darcy stories, in which similar lenses are the badges of the King's Messengers, invented by the wizard "Sir Edward Elmer".

Harry Harrison wrote the humorous and comprehensive parody Star Smashers of the Galaxy Rangers in 1973.

In the DC Comics universe, the Green Lantern Corps bears many parallels to the Lensmen, though the original editor (Julius Schwartz) denied any connection. Later writers would add characters that directly referenced the Lensman series, such as the extraterrestrial Green Lanterns Arisia and Eddore.

In Robert A. Heinlein's The Number of the Beast, the protagonists encounter a Lensman. The novel's alternate version, The Pursuit of the Pankera, has an extended version of the Lensman sequence.

In the popular trading card game Magic: The Gathering, the Dominion Bracelet is a reference to The Lens.

== See also ==
- Wolf–Lundmark–Melotte—a galaxy that may be the "Second Galaxy" mentioned in the series.
