= Backstage Lensman =

- Short story by Randall Garrett
- Country: United States
- Language: English
- Genre: Science fiction

Publication
- Published in: Analog Science Fiction and Fact
- Publication type: Magazine
- Media type: Print (Paperback)
- Publication date: June 1978
- Series: Lensman

"Backstage Lensman" is a short story by Randall Garrett, a parody or pastiche of the Lensman series of E.E. 'Doc' Smith. It was first written in 1949, lost and then rewritten in 1978.

Garrett claimed that "Doc read the first version of 'Backstage Lensman' and laughed all through the convention. It was his suggestion that I call the spaceship Dentless rather than Dauntless."

== Publications ==
- Analog, June 1978
- Takeoff, a collection of short fiction and poems by Randall Garrett, 1980
- Shaggy B.E.M. Stories, an anthology edited by Mike Resnick, 1988
