= Triplanetary (board game) =

1973 Science fiction board game

Space Combat in the Solar System 2001
- Second edition box cover by Rich Banner, 1981
- Designers: Marc W. Miller; John Harshman
- Publishers: Game Designers' Workshop 1973, 1981; Steve Jackson Games 1991
- Publication: 1973; 52 years ago
- Genres: science fiction board wargame

Triplanetary is a science fiction board wargame originally published by Game Designers' Workshop in 1973. The game is a simulation of space ship travel and combat within the Solar System in the early 21st Century.

== History ==
=== First edition ===
Triplanetary was designed by Marc W. Miller and John Harshman, loosely based on novels and short stories from the Golden Age of Science Fiction, particularly the Future History works of Robert Heinlein. Triplanetary was originally conceived as the first part of a proposed series of games that was to be named "The Stars! The Stars!" As Miller related, a late-night session of Lensman with Harshman using blank hex-grid battle board combat "inspired the design for Triplanetary, with its image of our solar system and use of vector movement".

In 1976, GDW released Triplanetary Variant V/2, an expansion of the suggested "Prospecting" scenario that was part of the original errata sheets.

=== Second edition ===
GDW published a second edition of the game in 1981. The packaging was changed from the cardboard tube to a standard box. The paper map and acetate overlay were replaced by a plastic-coated map, but players still plotted their vectors using a supplied grease pencil. A few changes were made to the rules, mainly from the originally published errata sheet. Several changes were made to the scenarios: two were dropped, four were added and the other four were modified; the total number of scenarios increased from six to eight. This edition had a box cover by Rich Banner.

=== Third edition ===
In 1989, Steve Jackson acquired the rights to the game, with ambitions to release a new version of the game in 1991 that would tighten up a number of rules to improve play. After various delays, the third edition was finally released by Steve Jackson Games in 2018.

== Contents ==
First edition rulebook cover

The game was originally packaged in a square cardboard tube, which contained a 16-page book of rules (with four pages of errata and clarifications that included two additional scenarios); a hex map of the inner Solar System; a clear acetate overlay for the map, a grease pencil, a set of cardboard counters representing the various spaceships, and a 6-sided die. The map included the Sun, Mercury, Venus, Earth and the Moon, Mars, two of the largest asteroids in the Asteroid belt as well as a hex for a secret asteroid base, and Jupiter, along with the four largest Jovian moons. For game play purposes, the placement of the Earth's Moon and the Jovian moons were not to scale.

== Gameplay ==
The clear acetate overlay allowed each player to plot the movement vectors of their ships. Each ship could accelerate during the turn, which then modified the vector one hex in any direction. The ships continued to follow their current vector from turn to turn, which could only be modified by acceleration or by entering the "gravity field" of a planet. For simplification purposes, this gravity field consisted of the six hexes surrounding the planet. Moons had a weaker gravity that only affected a course when ships pass through two adjacent hexes Acceleration consumed part of a ship's fuel supply, and players were required to track the current fuel remaining on each ship. If all the fuel was consumed, a ship would be unable to accelerate. Ships could refuel by landing on friendly planets, orbiting a base, or passing slowly through an asteroid base. They could also refuel by matching speed with another ship (such as a tanker) and transferring fuel.

Each game was played in a series of turns that alternated between each of the players. Each turn a player followed a sequence of five phases:

1. Astrogation — plot the movement vector of each ship.
2. Ordnance — launch mines and torpedoes from ships.
3. Movement — follow plotted course to new location.
4. Combat — attack enemy ships in range, including using mines and torpedoes; roll for space hazards.
5. Resupply — perform various logistical activities, as well as looting and rescue.

Ship counters displayed the vessel silhouette, an identifier number, the combat rating, fuel capacity, and the cargo capacity. The counters were printed in several colors to represent different sides in each conflict.

Combat used a damage table that was based on the ratio of the attacker ship combat strength to that of the defender. The odds ranged from 1:2 to 4:1. A six-sided dice roll was used to determine the results of an attack, with one subtracted from the roll for each hex of range between the ships. Before the results are applied, the ship being attacked can optionally fire upon its attackers. The results of an attack are expressed in a number of turns the ship is disabled, or, for high odds and a favorable roll, the ship is destroyed. Higher dice rolls resulted in more damage. If the cumulative damage to a ship required more than 5 turns to repair, the ship was destroyed. Torpedoes and mines also had their own combat damage tables that were used when the course of a mine or torpedo intersected a ship. There were also damage results for ramming attacks, as well as for moving too rapidly through asteroid hexes.

Some scenarios use hidden counters, so that ships and planets could only identify enemy vessels that came within range. Planets could detect ship types up to five hexes away, while ships could scan a distance of three hexes.

=== Scenarios ===
The game came with six scenarios:

- Grand Tour — A multi-player race about the planets, to familiarize the players with the vector movement system.
- Escape — One player attempts to escape a tyrannical government by fleeing the Solar System, while the other tries to stop the escape.
- Lateral 7 — Pirates try to nab a wealthy liner while avoiding the navy.
- Interplanetary War — Earth colonies rebel from the rule of the mother planet.
- Alien Invasion — Terran forces try to stop an invading fleet of alien barbarians.
- Piracy — Pirates try to loot merchant transports while Space Patrol tries to neutralize their efforts.

The errate sheet also listed two more suggested scenarios:

- Prospecting — Economic scenario of mining asteroids.
- Retribution — Follow up to the Escape scenario.

== Reception ==
In the December 1974 issue of Airfix Magazine, Bruce Quarrie gave a positive review of the game and its mechanics, concluding, "Since it is our experience that the majority of wargamers enjoy science fiction and vice-versa, we can see this game catching on in quite a big way. Great fun!"

Two reviews of the original game and its variant appeared in 1976 issues of The Space Gamer. In Issue 4, Scott Rusch gave the original version of Triplanetary a very positive review, saying, "It's quite a flexible game, and it's fun. It's even fairly accurate, which is something most tactical space games can't claim. I heartily recommend it." Several months later, in Issue 9, Kelly Moorman gave a strong recommendation to the Triplanetary Variant V/2, saying, ""I would recommend this variant to anyone interested in a very realistic space-economic-tactical game."

In his 1977 book The Comprehensive Guide to Board Wargaming, Nicholas Palmer thought the game had "a relatively realistic scope [...] the system is not difficult, though it takes a little getting used to." He noted that the scenarios provided "a long and intricate game."

In the July 1981 edition of Dragon, Tony Watson welcomed the return of Triplanetary as one of the best SF games on the market. He admitted that the game wasn't perfect, especially the messy map caused by continuously adding grease pencil trails during a long scenario. And although the vector movement system was accurate, Watson pointed out that the planets never move, although they should be orbiting around the Sun. "The designer has apparently decided to sacrifice this bit of realism for the sake of playability, and it seems to make a great deal of sense." He concluded, "Triplanetary is a marvelously well conceived game that plays well and is a lot of fun. It is varied and interesting, and fairly dripping with the feel of the old-style SF novels many of us grew up with. Even eight years after its initial appearance, [it] compares favorably with the plethora of other SF titles on the market."

In the July 1981 edition of The Space Gamer (Issue No. 41), William A. Barton reviewed the 1981 edition of Triplanetary, and noted the disappearance of two scenarios from the original list, "Invasion" and "Piracy". Barton felt the editing of the new rules in was not clean, stating, "GDW should release an errata sheet."

== See also ==
- Attack Vector: Tactical - a similar hex based space game that attempts to add three dimensional space movement and targeting rules, as well as realistic inertial dynamics.
- Galac-Tac
- Starweb
