= Grey Lensman =

1939 novel by Edward Elmer Smith

- Dust-jacket from the first edition. The picture was taken from the cover of Astounding Science-Fiction, October 1939, in which the first episode of the serialized story originally appeared.
- Author: Edward E. Smith, Ph.D.
- Illustrator: Ric Binkley
- Cover artist: Hubert Rogers
- Language: English
- Series: Lensman series
- Genre: Science fiction
- Publisher: Fantasy Press
- Publication date: 1951
- Publication place: United States
- Media type: Print (Hardback)
- Pages: 306
- OCLC: 1051169
- Preceded by: Galactic Patrol
- Followed by: Second Stage Lensmen

Grey Lensman (originally Gray Lensman) is a science fiction novel by American writer E. E. Smith. It was first published in book form in 1951 by Fantasy Press in an edition of 5,096 copies. The novel was originally serialized in the magazine Astounding in 1939. Grey Lensman is the fourth (originally the second) book in the Lensman series and the second to focus on the adventures of Lensman Kimball Kinnison.

== Plot synopsis ==
The action in Grey Lensman picks up immediately where Galactic Patrol left off, in the middle of the battle to destroy Helmuth's Main Base and, it is hoped, fully end the threat of Boskone. After the base falls, Kinnison finds some clues that lead him to think that Helmuth was perhaps not the head of Boskone after all. The clues lead Kinnison to mount an expedition aboard the newly constructed super-dreadnought Dauntless, into the Second Galaxy where he thinks the true head of Boskone might reside. The Dauntless locates a planet under attack and comes to its aid, destroying the Boskonian forces and discovering that the entire planet is capable of going "free" (that is, inertialess, the method used in the Lensman books to achieve interstellar and intergalactic space travel). The Lensman returns to the First Galaxy with the space-faring planet and its grateful residents.

Kinnison decides that since the Patrol is not yet strong enough to attack the Second Galaxy militarily, he will follow leads to the upper levels of Boskone through the traffic in the illegal drug thionite.

The novel then follows Kinnison as he tries to infiltrate the Boskonian drug network. Along the way, Kinnison learns something else new: as a Second Stage Lensman he no longer needs his Lens to do Lensman things such as read minds or communicate telepathically, although he works better while wearing it. Kinnison suffers some setbacks, and has to assume different identities, eventually one requiring him to drink and use drugs. Even though he tries to drink while actually letting the people around him empty the bottles, and uses the least harmful drug he can, it still takes him a while to get over their effects. Eventually he uncovers the information he was looking for: the name and the location of Jalte, the boss of all Boskonian drug traffic in the First Galaxy.

There is a minor interlude in which the Delgonian Overlords seem to have returned. Because he had fought the Overlords before, Kinnison is asked to lead the expedition to hunt them down, and the reptilian Worsel comes along. The Delgonians are dispatched in fairly short order, but only after the loss of many good men. Kinnison agonizes over the casualties that they suffered because, although he and Worsel were mentally strong enough to resist the Overlords, his men were not.

Realizing that the Patrol will need new and much more powerful weapons before it can take on Boskone in the Second Galaxy, Kinnison convenes 50 of the greatest scientists in the galaxy to work on new weapon-development projects. The weapon they invent, whose theory requires the development of a wholly new mathematics, is called a "negasphere", composed of something combining the attributes of antimatter and negative matter. It totally consumes absolutely anything it touches, in mutual annihilation. They plan to make a negasphere of planetary dimensions and use it against the leaders of Boskone.

Kinnison infiltrates Jalte's base and gets the information he had been hoping for since his trip to the Second Galaxy: the location of the leaders of Boskone, a group made up of members of a race called the Eich. He and Worsel set out on what amounts to an almost suicide mission to infiltrate Jarnevon, the homeworld of the Eich. Kinnison is captured and tortured. Unknown to the Eich, Worsel is hiding close by and finds a way to rescue Kinnison, and they get away. Infected by something that requires the Patrol doctors to amputate all four limbs, blinded, and tortured almost to death, Kinnison is nonetheless saved, but he will most likely be a basket case.

Earlier in the book, a Posenian physician called "Phillips" was financed by the Patrol to try to develop a way to allow higher beings to regenerate body parts in the same way that lower animals (starfish, flatworms, salamanders, etc.) can. When Kinnison was injured, Phillips was ready to try his procedure on humans. It works and Kinnison is brought back to full health. During his convalescence Clarissa MacDougall is again his nurse, and their love grows stronger.

He then leads an expedition to destroy Jalte's base, using the negasphere. He continues to the Boskonian home ground in the Second Galaxy, to destroy their fleet and then the Eich's home base using a "nutcracker"—a pair of planets with diametrically opposed velocities, released to crush Jarnevon between them. And so pass the Eich and the Council of Boskone. It is thought that finally the long struggle is finished and Civilization is triumphant.

Kinnison and MacDougall make plans to get married and the book ends with them walking off, hand in hand, into a bright and happy future.

== Reception ==
Groff Conklin gave the novel's first edition a scathing review in Galaxy, describing it as a "primitive artifact" which "simply gives [me] alternate waves of incredulous laughter and dull, acid boredom." P. Schuyler Miller reviewed the novel favorably, saying "Whatever [Smith's] yarns have, Grey Lensman has more of, in greater abundance and variety, than any of the rest." One newspaper reviewer described it as "Science fiction of the highest calibre."

== Sources ==
- Chalker, Jack L.; Mark Owings (1998). The Science-Fantasy Publishers: A Bibliographic History, 1923-1998. Westminster, MD and Baltimore: Mirage Press, Ltd. p. 238.
- Brown, Charles N.; William G. Contento. "The Locus Index to Science Fiction (1984-1998)".
- Tuck, Donald H. (1978). The Encyclopedia of Science Fiction and Fantasy. Chicago: Advent. pp. 397–398. ISBN 0-911682-22-8.
- Ellik, Ron and Bill Evans (1966). The Universes of E.E. Smith. Chicago: Advent:Publishers. ISBN 0-911682-03-1.
