= Triplanetary (novel) =

1934 novel by Edward Elmer Smith

- Dust-jacket from the first edition
- Author: Edward E. Smith, Ph.D.
- Illustrator: A. J. Donnell
- Cover artist: A. J. Donnell
- Language: English
- Series: Lensman series
- Genre: Science fiction
- Publisher: Fantasy Press
- Publication date: 1934, 1948
- Publication place: United States
- Media type: Print (Hardback)
- Pages: 287
- OCLC: 1225609
- Followed by: First Lensman

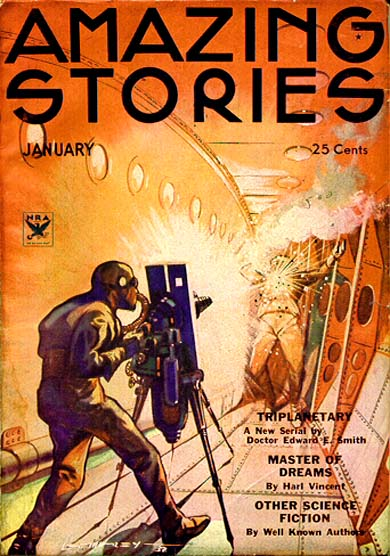
The first installment of Triplanetary took the cover of the January 1934 issue of Amazing Stories, illustrated by Leo Morey.

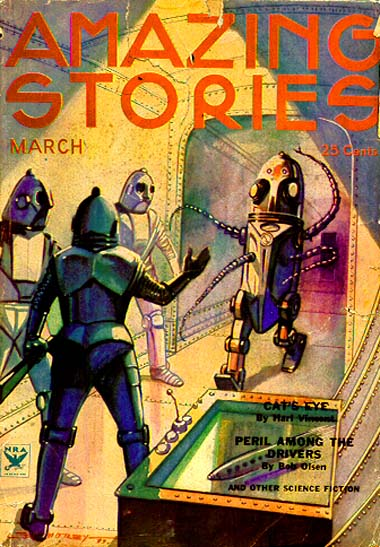
Another Morey cover illustrated the third installment in the March 1934 Amazing Stories.

Triplanetary is a science fiction novel and space opera by American writer E. E. Smith. It was first serialized in the magazine Amazing Stories in 1934. After the original four novels of the Lensman series were published, Smith expanded and reworked Triplanetary into the first of two prequels for the series. The fix-up novel Triplanetary was published in book form in 1948 by Fantasy Press. The second prequel, First Lensman, was a new original novel published in 1950 by Fantasy Press.

The novel covers several episodes in an eons-long human breeding project by the super-intelligences of the Arisians. This alien race is breeding two genetic lines to become the ultimate weapon in Arisia's cosmic war with their arch-enemies, the Eddorians. The initial chapters cover the Kinnison genetic line during the fall of Atlantis and Nero's reign in Rome. These tales were inserted into the novel following the serialized release, along with chapters covering members of the Kinnison line in World Wars One, Two, and Three.

The final chapter of Triplanetary tells of the discovery of the inertialess drive that allows faster-than-light travel. Patrolman Conway Costigan and his friends engage in a space battle with Gray Roger the pirate gangster. This conflict is complicated by the arrival of the technologically superior, extra-Solar, amphibian-like Nevians, resulting in the first interstellar war involving humans. In this story Virgil Samms and Roderick Kinnison, important members of the two breeding lines, are introduced.

== Plot synopsis ==
=== Background ===
Triplanetary is a prologue to the Lensman series. It consists of two parts. The first explains the series background, which consists of a conflict between the evil Eddorians and the benevolent Arisians. This conflict is carried out throughout the history of an oblivious humankind on Earth. The Arisians undertake a eugenics project to breed two human genetic lines that are intended to become the ultimate weapon in Arisia's cosmic war with Eddore.

The author takes five defining chapters to cover the background of the Kinnison line: the destruction of Atlantis in a nuclear war, an attempted coup in Rome against the Eddorian-controlled Nero, the First and Second World Wars, and, finally, a nuclear Third World War. In each of these periods he tells part of the story of the two families who will be of importance later on, and who will produce the two people whose children will be the culmination of the human breeding line, Kimball Kinnison and Clarissa MacDougall. One genetic line is surnamed "Kinnison" or some close variation. The other line is distinguished by having "red-bronze-auburn hair" and unusually colored "gold-flecked, tawny eyes".

The final part of the book, which was originally published as a magazine story, takes up the tale after civilization has been rebuilt with the covert help of the Arisians. Humanity has explored the Solar System and formed the Triplanetary League, which consists of an alliance of Earth with the governments of Mars and Venus. Prior to the start of the main story, humans have set up in-system colonies and fought the first interplanetary war against the Adepts of North Polar Jupiter.

=== Main story ===
As the story begins, interplanetary commerce is plagued by pirates. The fleet of these pirates is led by Gray Roger, a surviving Adept of North Polar Jupiter. Unbeknownst to the Patrol, Gray Roger is actually Gharlane of Eddore. The pirate fleet and the Triplanetary Patrol are in the midst of a large-scale engagement when an alien race known as the Nevians show up. The Nevians are the dominant, amphibious race of the planet Nevia, located many light years distant from the Sun. Their planet is in a galactic region that has very little iron, which they use as an energy source, so they set out with a spaceship to try to obtain more.

The Nevians decide that humans are inferior beings, and carve up both fleets using a ray that extracts every atom of free or combined iron in both sides' ships and personnel into a red, liquid "allotropic iron". The iron is used in this form by the Nevians to power their interstellar ships and their power plants at home. The use of this ray means the death of nearly every person in both fleets. Roger survives the battle and flees to start a new operation on a distant world.

After absorbing the fleets, the Nevian ship goes on to the Earth and the same action is taken against the city of Pittsburgh before the ship heads for home. A Triplanetary Patrol agent named Conway Costigan is captured by the Nevians, along with his love interest, Clio Marsden, and an old space-hand and friend, Captain Bradley. Costigan is actually an undercover operative of Triplanetary Intelligence and uses a secret technology called an ultrawave spy ray to examine the Nevian technology. He reports home to Earth scientists.

On Earth, Patrol scientists are working feverishly on their new "Super Ship", the Boise. This ship has mankind's first inertialess drive and can travel faster than light. Using Costigan's reports, human scientists figure out Nevian technology, improve upon it, and install it on the Boise. After forcing a second Nevian ship to flee, the Boise heads for Nevia. On the way, the Boise locates the new pirate base. After much fighting, Roger is defeated by a resurgent Patrol armed with both human and Nevian technology.

The three humans captured by the Nevians are taken home to Nevia and put on display as zoological specimens. Costigan and his companions stage several escape attempts, but are repeatedly foiled. Finally they escape, having destroyed a Nevian city with a chemical weapon, and head for Earth, being chased by the first Nevian ship. The Boise reaches them before the Nevians do, and Costigan and his companions are rescued. The Nevians are then fought to a stalemate. A peace is negotiated and the Nevians are forced to acknowledge humans as equals.

== Publication history ==
Triplanetary was first serialized in the magazine Amazing Stories in 1934. Following the success of his Lensman series, Smith expanded and reworked the novel into the first of two Lensman prequels. Triplanetary was published in book form in 1948 by Fantasy Press in an edition of 4,941 copies. The second prequel was a new original novel, First Lensman, published in 1950 by Fantasy Press.

Major changes to the original version were new introductory chapters concerning the history of the benevolent super-race, the Arisians (who resemble giant human brains) and their enemies, the demonic super-race, the Eddorians (who resemble amoebas). Smith also introduced the idea that the original novel's villain, Gray Roger, had always been secretly Gharlane of Eddore, but disguised in human form. It is also explained that Gharlane had previously disguised himself as Nero.

== Reception ==
P. Schuyler Miller, reviewing the 1948 edition, praised the novel as the opening of "an epic which has no parallel in science fiction". Algis Budrys said that Triplanetary "validated the melding of engineers' dreams and pulp grandiosity, dubbed 'superscience fiction'". Everett F. Bleiler, however, characterized the novel as "old-fashioned space opera, with a typical romance"; he faulted Smith's modifications to fit the story into his Lensman continuity as "far from convincing".

== See also ==
- Space diving
- Bergenholm space drive

== Sources ==
- Chalker, Jack L.; Mark Owings (1998). The Science-Fantasy Publishers: A Bibliographic History, 1923-1998. Westminster, MD and Baltimore: Mirage Press, Ltd. p. 235.
- Brown, Charles N.; William G. Contento. "The Locus Index to Science Fiction (1984-1998)".
- Tuck, Donald H. (1978). The Encyclopedia of Science Fiction and Fantasy. Chicago: Advent. p. 398. ISBN 0-911682-22-8.
- Ellik, Ron & Bill Evans (1966). The Universes of E.E. Smith. Chicago: Advent:Publishers. ISBN 0-911682-03-1.
