= Second Stage Lensmen =

1953 novel by Edward E. Smith

- Dust-jacket from the first edition
- Author: Edward E. Smith, Ph.D.
- Illustrator: Ric Binkley
- Cover artist: Ric Binkley
- Language: English
- Series: Lensman series
- Genre: Science fiction
- Publisher: Fantasy Press
- Publication date: 1953
- Publication place: United States
- Media type: Print (Hardback)
- Pages: 307
- OCLC: 1225493
- Preceded by: Gray Lensman
- Followed by: Children of the Lens

Second Stage Lensmen is a science fiction novel by author Edward E. Smith. It was first published in book form in 1953 by Fantasy Press in an edition of 4,934 copies. The novel was originally serialized in the magazine Astounding beginning in 1941. Second Stage Lensmen is the fifth volume in the Lensman series, and the last to feature Kimball Kinnison as the most powerful Lensman in the service of the Galactic Patrol. Second Stage Lensmen also features the first female Lensman, Clarissa MacDougall. The story mainly focuses upon the exploits of the "Second Stage" Lensmen: those who have gone through the advanced Arisian training Kinnison underwent in Galactic Patrol. These four superior Lensmen, Kinnison, Worsel, Tregonsee, and Nadreck, and to a slightly lesser degree MacDougall, are armed with mental powers allowing them to control the minds of others and see, hear, and feel without using their physical senses (the "sense of perception"). This elite cadre allows Civilization to tip the balance against Boskone as Second Stage Lensmen abilities are ideally suited to spying and information gathering.

== Plot synopsis ==
The story picks up immediately where Gray Lensman left off as Kimball and Clarissa are heading off to get ready for their impending marriage. Mentor of Arisia stops them by commanding Kim to "think" before he acts, and Kim, of course, immediately realizes that the Boskonian organization was probably not destroyed when Jarnevon was cracked between two other planets and still poses a grave threat to Civilization. The wedding is put on hold as Kinnison and the other Lensmen set about coming up with a defense for the expected attack upon Earth. Since one of the themes of the series is that as soon as one side develops a particular weapon, the other soon figures out how to duplicate it; the Lensmen assume that Earth will be subjected to an attack using either a negasphere (negative energy that consumes anything it touches) or two high velocity planets, used like a nutcracker. Earth is attacked, and by the slimmest margin, the enemy fleet is defeated. As before in this series, the ultimate weapon featured in the previous book becomes the standard for the opening stages of this one, and newer, more powerful weaponry must be developed to deal with the new danger. In this case the weapon developed is the “Sunbeam”, where the entire output of the sun is converted to an energy beam and used to vaporize much of the Boskonian fleet when it shows up. By now everyone has "thought screens" (developed by the Velantians) rendering the ability of the Lensmen to read others' minds only useful when the opposition is captured or sloppy, so the Lensmen must find new ways to gather information.

Kinnison's investigations take him to the planet of Lyrane II, ruled by a matriarchy of women who have advanced mental abilities, but apparently little or no art, literature, music, or other cultural assets. The Lyranian who meets Kinnison when he lands immediately tries to mentally kill him, as does every other Lyranian. Kinnison handles their mental attacks easily. They don't want to cooperate in handing over the "zwilnik" (the series' slang for a Boskonian drug dealer) he came for, but knowing they can't stop him from taking her, they let them go. After Kinnison's ship leaves, Lyrane II comes under attack by two Boskonian ships and the matriarchs, who are helpless against thought screened pirates with advanced weapons, have to call Kinnison and the Patrol to come back and help them.

On the way back to Tellus (Earth) with the zwilnik, Kinnison decides that, in some way, Lyrane II is connected with Boskone. He knows that no male, except a Lensman, could survive a minute in that man-hating culture, and even a Lensman would have to spend all his time protecting himself. Only a female could be effective, but there were no female Lensmen. Kinnison makes the decision, after consulting Mentor, that the best person for the job is Clarissa MacDougall. She flatly refuses to have any contact with Mentor, so it's up to Kinnison to give her the mental training needed to make her (almost) a Second Stage Lensman. Mentor sees to it that her Lens is delivered, and as Civilization's first female Lensman, she goes to Lyrane II to try to find its link, if any, to Boskone.

After sending Clarissa to Lyrane II, Kinnison and Nadreck set about following a lead to the main Boskonian threat by tracing an enemy communications line leading into the second galaxy. The Galactic Patrol is by now ready to begin a full-scale invasion of the second galaxy, so Port Admiral Haynes mobilizes the Grand Fleet. With the patrol invading their home galaxy in overwhelming force, the Boskonians are too busy to worry about a communications line, so Kinnison and Nadreck trace it all the way back to the Thrallis system. Nadreck takes on the Boskonian headquarters on the frigid world of Onlo and sets about carefully fomenting discord by tampering with the minds of the various Onlonians he finds there. Kinnison infiltrates Thrale, inhabited by a near-human race that forms the core race around which Boskone's strength is built.

Kinnison infiltrates the Tyrant of Thrale's personal guards. Since advancement within Boskonia is based on deceit and assassination, and as a second stage Lensman is much better at anything needing intelligence than the average Boskonian, he soon rises to a position just under the Tyrant. Soon he finds a way to assassinate the Tyrant and take his place. only to find the real power is in the hands of Fossten, the Prime Minister. Kinnison must not give the mentally super-powerful prime-minister any reason to doubt that he is anything but a loyal member of Boskonia, so he does just what the former Tyrant was planning to do, he directs the construction of a massive fleet to attack the Patrol's foothold in the Second Galaxy: the massively fortified planet of Klovia.

He keeps the Patrol advised of the construction and the progress of the fleet via his Lens, so when Thrale launches its attack, they sail into a carefully planned trap. Since the Boskonian fleet that attacked Earth was completely destroyed by the Sunbeam, and no word of the weapon could be sent back to Boskonia, the Tyrant's fleet sailed directly into the path of the Sunbeam, and between Sunbeam and the Patrol's Grand Fleet, it was totally destroyed. The ship Kinnison and Fossten were on wasn't destroyed because Kinnison disabled its drive and it dropped out of the fleet just before the battle was joined.

While the patrol was taking care of the Boskonian fleet, Kimball faces off against Fossten. A battle royal ensues, deadly to the crew members even though it was fought with mental weapons. The spent forces bouncing off the mental shields of the two combatants were enough to destroy the minds of all the crew members of the ship. Kinnison at last beats down Fossten's mental shield and what he sees before him is basically just a brain, looking enough like Mentor of Arisia to be his brother. Kinnison sends a lensed thought to Mentor and asks what an Arisian is doing leading Boskone? Mentor's explanation satisfies Kinnison so he never realizes that in actuality, he has just defeated and destroyed Gharlane of Eddore, the entity who, as Nero, Gray Roger, and many others, was responsible for most of the death and misery in Earth's history. Mentor has used his mental power to make Kinnison see what he thinks is an Arisian instead of Gharlane's actual form. The time has not yet come for any member of Civilization to see what the ultimate leaders of Boskone actually are.

Kimball Kinnison returns to Thrale with agents of the Patrol to begin the slow and painful process of bringing Thrale and the rest of Boskonia into Civilization. While Kinnison is taking over the warm-blooded, oxygen-breathing part of Boskonia, Nadreck is doing the same with the Onlonians, leaders of the frigid world dwellers of Boskonia. Nadreck isn't Kinnison and goes about it in a completely different way, but the results are the same and Onlo falls. Civilization and the Galactic Patrol are now in control of both the first and second galaxy.

The book ends with Kinnison being made Galactic Coordinator of the Second Galaxy and finally marrying Clarissa MacDougall.

== Reception ==
Reviewing the 1953 edition, Groff Conklin described Smith's writing as "pretty dull going for people who want a bit more than thud and blunder." P. Schuyler Miller called the novel "space opera to the nth degree," saying "you either like it a lot—though you probably won't believe a word of it—or you can't stand it at all".

== Sources ==
- Chalker, Jack L.; Mark Owings (1998). The Science-Fantasy Publishers: A Bibliographic History, 1923-1998. Westminster, MD and Baltimore: Mirage Press, Ltd. p. 239.
- Brown, Charles N.; William G. Contento. "The Locus Index to Science Fiction (1984-1998)".
- Tuck, Donald H. (1978). The Encyclopedia of Science Fiction and Fantasy. Chicago: Advent. p. 398. ISBN 0-911682-22-8.
- Ellik, Ron and Bill Evans (1966). The Universes of E.E. Smith. Chicago: Advent:Publishers. ISBN 0-911682-03-1.
