= Children of the Lens (novel) =

1947 novel by Edward Elmer Smith

- Dust-jacket from the first edition
- Author: Edward E. Smith, Ph.D.
- Illustrator: Ric Binkley
- Cover artist: Ric Binkley
- Language: English
- Series: Lensman series
- Genre: Science fiction
- Publisher: Fantasy Press
- Publication date: 1954
- Publication place: United States
- Pages: 293
- OCLC: 1225830
- Preceded by: Second Stage Lensmen

Children of the Lens is a science fiction novel by American author E. E. Smith. It was originally serialized in the magazine Astounding beginning in 1947, and was first published in book form in 1954 by Fantasy Press in an edition of 4,874 copies. It is the last book in Smith's Lensman series.

The Children of the Lens are the culmination of the Arisian breeding program, and are to be their weapons in the final assault on Eddore. The book introduces the five Kinnison children: Kit, Camilla, Constance, Karen, and Kathryn. Born with the abilities that Second Stage Lensmen possess only through years of intensive training, they become the Third Stage Lensmen with abilities that even the Arisians do not fully understand. Here, battles between massive fleets and super-weapons no longer have the main role. The battles may be just as intense, but most are more low-key, with brains and subtle maneuvering being more important than who has the biggest fleets and most powerful weapons.

== Plot synopsis ==
Children of the Lens is the sixth and final book in the Lensman series. The story takes place twenty years after the close of Second Stage Lensmen, and focuses on the five children of Kimball and Clarrissa Kinnison: a boy and two pairs of twin girls. As Kimball and Clarrissa are both Lensmen, their offspring are dubbed the "Children of the Lens". They are also the ultimate product of a two-billion-year-long Arisian breeding program that has molded them into "third-level" minds with such potential power that not even the Arisians themselves fully understand their capabilities.

The story of the children is intertwined with the story of the five Second Stage Lensmen: Kimball, Worsel, Nadreck, Tregonsee, and Clarrissa (who becomes a full Second Stage Lensman). Spurred into action by a series of seeming untraceable terrorist attacks, and other unexplainable events in both the First and Second Galaxy, Kimball asks the other Second Stage Lensmen to help him trace down the source of the troubles. Each of these Lensmen rushes to his aid and each pursues the task from a different angle. The Second Stage Lensmen address the problem in their usual style: Kimball is energetic and direct, Nadreck is cautious and thorough, Clarrissa gets sent to Lyrane II again, and so on. They are each assisted, more or less covertly, by one of the children but seem unable to get a grip on the problems. One at a time, each of the children realizes that they need additional training, and travel to Arisia to obtain it. They are then able to help their Lensman complete their missions. All of the lensmen are led to essentially the same conclusion: the hitherto unknown planet of Ploor is the location of the race controlling the remnants of Boskone.

As with the other books in the series, the technology in this book far surpasses the technology of the previous books. Whereas in earlier books free planets were set astride target planets and used like giant nut-crackers or negative energy "negaspheres" were the ultimate in weaponry, unique items constructed with great difficulty, in Children of the Lens these weapons are deployed in the hundreds by both sides. The Eddorians develop their own version of the Lens, permitting the creation of "Black Lensmen" who, because of the basic flaws in the way the Eddorians deal with their subject races, turn out to be surprisingly ineffective. The hyperspace tubes, rare in earlier books, are now the standard way to insert an invading fleet into enemy territory. Not only are the massive fleets of Civilization equipped with single-shot "primary" and "secondary" beam weapons, they now have super-atomic (total conversion of mass to energy) bombs, also deployed by the thousands. The Patrol eventually revisits the strange alternate universe called "Nth space", where nothing goes slower than light. There they render two superluminal planets inertialess to use as the ultimate weapons in destroying both Ploor and its sun. Soon two Patrol hyperspace tubes open, one aimed at Ploor and another one aimed at its sun. The Ploorians are confident that their world's defenses are powerful enough to handle anything the Patrol can throw at them. The two planets, traveling faster than light, erupt from the ends of the tubes and strike the planet and its sun, whereupon the Ploorian solar system simply ceases to exist.

After the destruction of Ploor, Mentor of Arisia alerts the children to the Eddorian threat, pointing out that unless they are dealt with quickly, they too will figure out the secret of obtaining superluminal planet busters and destroy Arisia, Earth, and Klovia in short order. The Eddorians must be destroyed immediately.

Mentor sends out a call to every living Lensman and using the combined mental energy of all the Lensmen in two galaxies, the entire Arisian race, and the Children of the Lens they prepare to launch a mental bolt against the Eddorians. The children have learned to form a five-fold super-mind called "The Unit". This was what the long Arisian breeding program was trying to achieve. The Unit is so advanced that even the Arisians don't know what it is capable of doing.

The mental bolt, with the massed power of every Lensman, every Arisian, and the Children of the Lens behind it, and guided by the Unit strikes, and penetrates, Eddore's defenses. With the failure of those defenses, the ancient enemies of Civilization are defeated and cease to exist. The long struggle against the Eddorians is finally over. At this point, Mentor reveals that the Arisians are passing on to the next plane of existence, their job as the guardians of Civilization finished. They have succeeded in developing a race far better than they to protect the galaxies, the Kinnison children. With this statement, the voice of Mentor, the last Arisian, fades and they are gone.

In an epilogue, Kit Kinnison leaves a message in a time capsule for a future civilization, presumably under threat from a new enemy, but so far in the future that the events of the long struggle between Civilization and Boskone may have been forgotten. This message tells the story of the war against Boskone and tells how to contact the Children of the Lens.

== Reception ==
While Galaxy reviewer Groff Conklin faulted the novel for its "style varying from the irritating to the infantile" and "its characters [not] much more than cardboard cutouts," he acknowledged that the Lensman series, "a sort of overblown fairy tales for modern juveniles," was "a pretty solid achievement." Anthony Boucher, saying that he found Smith's works unreadable, nevertheless noted that "I know a number of rational people who insist that they represent the acme of hypergalactic adventure." P. Schuyler Miller noted that even though "by this time superlatives have exhausted superlatives in the intergalactic slugging match between Good and Evil," Smith managed to remain convincing to his readers.

== Sequels ==
In "Larger Than Life", a tribute to E.E. Smith included in his Expanded Universe, American author Robert A. Heinlein wrote:

The Lensman [series] was left unfinished. There was to have been at least a seventh volume. As always, Doc had worked it out in great detail, but never (so far as I know) wrote it down because it was unpublishable then. But he told me the ending orally and in private. I shan't repeat it, it is not my story. Possibly somewhere there is a manuscript, I hope so! All I will say is that the ending develops by inescapable logic from clues in Children of the Lens.

== Publication history ==
The novel was originally serialized in the magazine Astounding beginning in 1947. Astounding editor John W. Campbell Jr. was reportedly reluctant to publish it, finding it antiquated. He was persuaded to run it by a science fiction fan named Ed Wood who pointed out how important the story had been to the magazine before it became established.

== Sources ==
- Chalker, Jack L.; Mark Owings (1998). The Science-Fantasy Publishers: A Bibliographic History, 1923-1998. Westminster, MD and Baltimore: Mirage Press, Ltd. pp. 239–240.
- Brown, Charles N.; William G. Contento. "The Locus Index to Science Fiction (1984-1998)".
- Tuck, Donald H. (1978). The Encyclopedia of Science Fiction and Fantasy. Chicago: Advent. p. 397. ISBN 0-911682-22-8.
- Ellik, Ron and Bill Evans (1966). The Universes of E.E. Smith. Chicago: Advent:Publishers. ISBN 0-911682-03-1.
