= E. E. Smith =

Food engineer and science-fiction author (1890–1965)

- Smith c. 1960
- Born: Edward Elmer Smith; May 2, 1890; Sheboygan, Wisconsin, US
- Died: August 31, 1965 (aged 75); Seaside, Oregon, US
- Education: University of Idaho, George Washington University
- Occupations: Food engineer, writer
- Spouse: Jeanne MacDougall (m. 1915)
- Children: 3
- Writing career
- Pen name: E. E. "Doc" Smith
- Period: 1928–1965 (published writer)
- Genre: Science fiction (notably space opera)

Edward Elmer Smith (May 2, 1890 – August 31, 1965) was an American food engineer (specializing in doughnut and pastry mixes) and science-fiction author, best known for the Lensman and Skylark series. He is sometimes called the father of space opera.

== Biography ==
=== Family and education ===
Edward Elmer Smith was born in Sheboygan, Wisconsin, on May 2, 1890, to Fred Jay Smith and Caroline Mills Smith, both staunch Presbyterians of British ancestry. His mother was a teacher born in Michigan in February 1855; his father was a sailor, born in Maine in January 1855 to an English father. They moved to Spokane, Washington, the winter after Edward Elmer was born, where Mr. Smith was working as a contractor in 1900. In 1902, the family moved to Seneaquoteen, near the Pend Oreille River, in Kootenai County, Idaho. He had four siblings, Rachel M. born September 1882, Daniel M. born January 1884, Mary Elizabeth born February 1886 (all of whom were born in Michigan), and Walter E. born July 1891 in Washington. In 1910, Fred and Caroline Smith and their son Walter were living in the Markham Precinct of Bonner County, Idaho; Fred is listed in census records as a farmer.

Smith worked mainly as a manual laborer until he injured his wrist while fleeing from a fire at the age of 19. He attended the University of Idaho. (Many years later he would be installed in the 1984 Class of the University of Idaho Alumni Hall of Fame.) He entered its prep school in 1907, and graduated with a bachelor’s degree in chemical engineering in 1914; later he got an MS in 1917 and a PhD in 1918 from George Washington University. He was president of the Chemistry Club, the Chess Club, and the Mandolin and Guitar Club, and captain of the Drill and Rifle Team; he also sang the bass lead in Gilbert and Sullivan operettas. His undergraduate thesis was Some Clays of Idaho, co-written with classmate Chester Fowler Smith, who died in California of tuberculosis the following year, after taking a teaching fellowship at Berkeley. Whether the two were related is not known.

On October 5, 1915, in Boise, Idaho he married Jeanne Craig MacDougall, the sister of his college roommate, Allen Scott (Scotty) MacDougall. (Her sister was named Clarissa MacLean MacDougall; the heroine of the Lensman novels would later be named Clarrissa MacDougall.) Jeanne MacDougall was born in Glasgow, Scotland; her parents were Donald Scott MacDougall, a violinist, and Jessica Craig MacLean. Her father had moved to Boise when the children were young, and later sent for his family; he died while they were en route in 1905. Jeanne's mother, who remarried businessman and retired politician John F. Kessler in 1914 worked at, and later owned, a boarding house on Ridenbaugh Street.

The Smiths had three children. Roderick N., born June 3, 1918, in the District of Columbia, was employed as a design engineer at Lockheed Aircraft. Verna Jean (later Verna Smith Trestrail), born August 25, 1920, in Michigan, was E. E. Smith's literary executor until her death in 1994. (Her son Kim Trestrail is now the executor.) Robert A. Heinlein in part dedicated his 1982 novel Friday to Verna. Clarissa M. (later Clarissa Wilcox), was born December 13, 1921, in Michigan.

=== Early chemical career and the beginning of Skylark ===
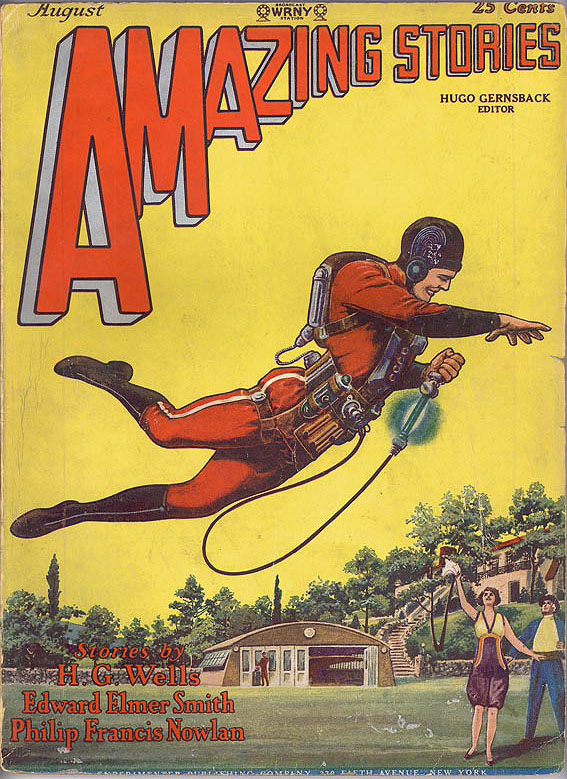
A scene from the first installment of The Skylark of Space, August 1928

After college, Smith was a junior chemist for the National Bureau of Standards in Washington, D.C., developing standards for butter and for oysters, while studying food chemistry at George Washington University. During World War I, he "wanted to fly a Jenny biplane, but chemists were too scarce. (Or were Jennies too valuable?)" He ended up being sent to the Commission for Relief in Belgium headed by Herbert Hoover.

One evening in 1915, the Smiths were visiting a former classmate from the University of Idaho, Dr. Carl Garby (1890–1928) who had also moved to Washington, D.C. He lived nearby in the Seaton Place Apartments with his wife, Lee Hawkins Garby. A long discussion about journeys into outer space ensued, and it was suggested that Smith should write down his ideas and speculations as a story about interstellar travel. Although he was interested, Smith believed after some thought that some romantic elements would be required and he was uncomfortable with that.

Lee Garby offered to take care of the love interest and the romantic dialogue, and Smith decided to give it a try. The sources of inspirations for the main characters in the novel were themselves; the "Seatons" and "Cranes" were based on the Smiths and Garbys, respectively. About one third of The Skylark of Space was completed by the end of 1916, when Smith and Garby gradually abandoned work on it.

Smith earned his master's degree in chemistry from the George Washington University in 1917, studying under Dr. Charles E. Munroe, whom Smith called "probably the greatest high-explosives man yet to live". Smith completed his PhD in chemical engineering in 1918, with a food engineering focus. His dissertation, The effect of bleaching with oxides of nitrogen upon the baking quality and commercial value of wheat flour, was published in 1919.

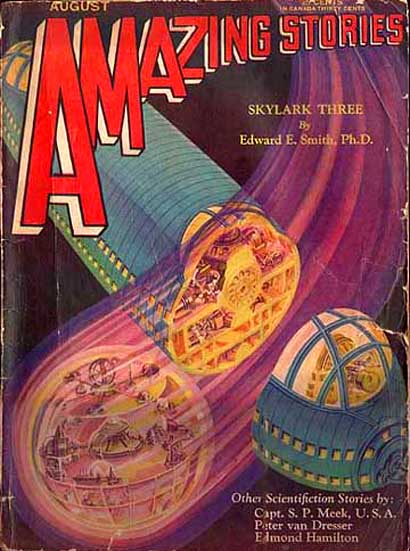
The serial novel Skylark Three began as Amazing Stories cover story (August 1930)

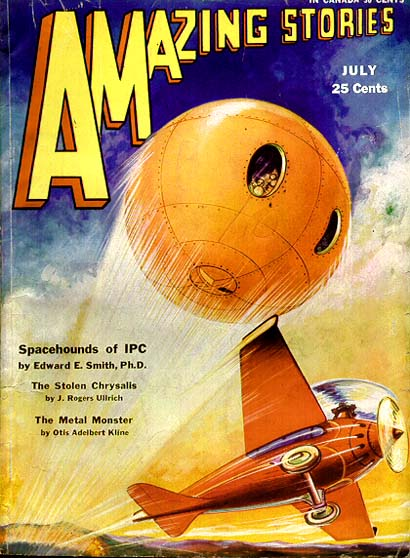
Spacehounds of IPC was also serialized in Amazing Stories.

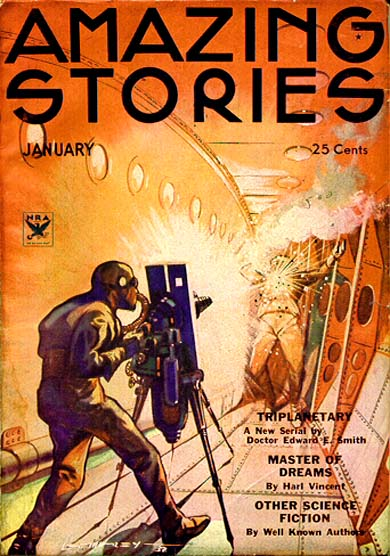
Triplanetary was the last of Smith's 1930s novels to be serialized in Amazing Stories; his Lensman novels were published in Astounding Stories.

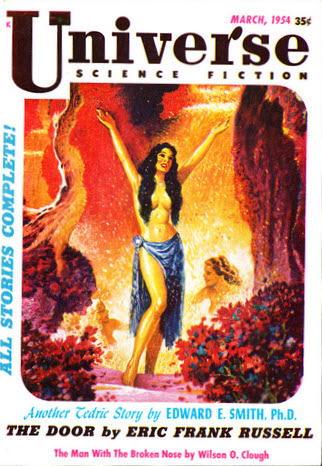
Smith's novelette "Lord Tedric", the cover story in the March 1954 issue of Universe Science Fiction, was novelized by Gordon Eklund nearly 25 years later.

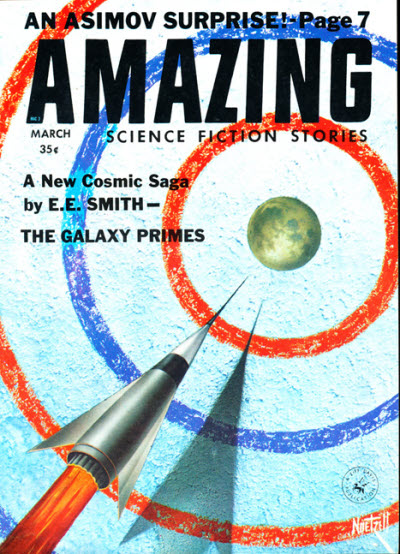
Smith's novel The Galaxy Primes was serialized in Amazing Stories in 1959.

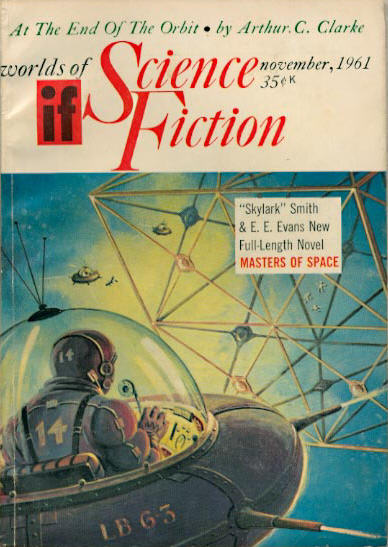
After E. Everett Evans died in 1958, Smith completed his unfinished novel, Masters of Space. The novel was serialized in If.

=== Writing Skylark ===
In 1919, Smith was hired as chief chemist for F. W. Stock & Sons of Hillsdale, Michigan, at one time the largest family-owned mill east of the Mississippi, working on doughnut mixes.

One evening late in 1919, after moving to Michigan, Smith was looking after his child (presumably Roderick) while his wife attended a movie. He resumed work on The Skylark of Space, finishing it in the spring of 1920. He submitted it to many book publishers and magazines, spending more in postage than he would eventually receive for its publication. Bob Davis, editor of Argosy, sent an encouraging rejection letter in 1922, saying that he liked the novel personally, but that it was too far out for his readers. Finally, upon seeing the April 1927 issue of Amazing Stories, he submitted it to that magazine. It was accepted, initially for $75, later raised to $125. It was published as a three-part serial in the August to October 1928 issues and it was such a success that associate editor Sloane requested a sequel before the second installment had been published. (According to Warner, but no other source, Smith began work on the sequel, Skylark Three, before the first book was accepted.)

Garby, whose husband died in 1928, was not interested in further collaboration, so Smith began work on Skylark Three alone. It was published as another three-part serial, in the August to October 1930 issues of Amazing, introduced as the cover story for August. This was as far as he had planned to take the Skylark series. It was praised in Amazing's letter column, and he was paid ¾¢ per word, surpassing Amazing's previous record of half a cent.

=== Names used for publications ===
The original magazine stories mostly have his name as Edward E. Smith, Ph.D.. But more recent editions usually give his name as either E. E. Doc Smith or E. E. "Doc" Smith.

=== The early 1930s: between Skylark and Lensman ===
Smith then began work on what he intended as a new series, starting with Spacehounds of IPC, which he finished in the autumn of 1930. In this novel, he took pains to avoid the scientific impossibilities which had bothered some readers of the Skylark novels. Even in 1938, after he had written Galactic Patrol, Smith considered it his finest work. He later said of it, "This was really scientific fiction; not, like the Skylarks, pseudo-science". Even at the end of his career, he considered it his only work of true science fiction. It was published in the July through September 1931 issues of Amazing, with Sloane making unauthorized changes. Fan letters in the magazine complained about the novel's containment within the Solar System, and Sloane sided with the readers. So when Harry Bates, editor of Astounding Stories, offered Smith 2¢/word—payable on publication—for his next story, he agreed. This meant that it could not be a sequel to Spacehounds.

This book would be Triplanetary, "in which scientific detail would not be bothered about, and in which his imagination would run riot." Indeed, characters within the story point out its psychological and scientific implausibilities, and sometimes even seem to suggest self-parody. At other times, they are conspicuously silent about obvious implausibilities. The January 1933 issue of Astounding announced that Triplanetary would appear in the March issue, and that issue's cover illustrated a scene from the story, but Astounding's financial difficulties prevented the story from appearing. Smith then submitted the manuscript to Wonder Stories, whose new editor, 17-year-old Charles D. Hornig, rejected it, later boasting about the rejection in a fanzine. He finally submitted it to Amazing, which published it beginning in January 1934, but for only half a cent a word. Shortly after it was accepted, F. Orlin Tremaine, the new editor of the revived Astounding, offered one cent a word for Triplanetary. When he learned that he was too late, he suggested a third Skylark novel instead.

In the winter of 1933–34, Smith worked on The Skylark of Valeron, but he felt that the story was getting out of control. He sent his first draft to Tremaine, with a distraught note asking for suggestions. Tremaine accepted the rough draft for $850, and announced it in the June 1934 issue, with a full-page editorial and a three-quarter-page advertisement. The novel was published in the August 1934 through February 1935 issues. Astounding's circulation rose by 10,000 for the first issue, and its two main competitors, Amazing and Wonder Stories, fell into financial difficulties, both skipping issues within a year.

=== The Lensman series ===
In January 1936, a time period where he was already an established science-fiction writer, he took a job for salary plus profit-sharing as production manager at Dawn Donut Co. of Jackson, Michigan. This initially entailed almost a year's worth of 18-hour days and seven-day workweeks. Individuals who knew Smith confirmed that he had a role in developing mixes for doughnuts and other pastries, but the contention that he developed the first process for making powdered sugar adhere to doughnuts cannot be substantiated. Smith was reportedly dislocated from his job at Dawn Donuts by prewar rationing in early 1940.

Smith had been contemplating writing a "space-police novel" since early 1927; once he had "the Lensmen's universe fairly well set up", he reviewed his science-fiction collection for "cops-and-robbers" stories. He cites Clinton Constantinescue's "War of the Universe" as a negative example, and Starzl and Williamson as positive ones. Tremaine responded extremely positively to a brief description of the idea.

Once Dawn Donuts became profitable in late 1936, Smith wrote an 85-page outline for what became the four core Lensman novels. In early 1937, Tremaine committed to buying them. Segmenting the story into four novels required considerable effort to avoid dangling loose ends. Smith cited Edgar Rice Burroughs as a negative example. After the outline was complete, he wrote a more detailed outline of Galactic Patrol, plus a detailed graph of its structure, with "peaks of emotional intensity and the valleys of characterization and background material." He notes, however, that he was never able to follow any of his outlines at all closely, as the "characters get away from me and do exactly as they damn please." After completing the rough draft of Galactic Patrol, he wrote the concluding chapter of the last book in the series, Children of the Lens. Galactic Patrol was published in the September 1937 through February 1938 issues of Astounding. Unlike the revised book edition, it was not set in the same universe as Triplanetary.

Gray Lensman, the fourth book in the series, appeared in Astounding's October 1939 through January 1940 issues. Gray Lensman was extremely well received, as was its cover illustration. Campbell's editorial in the December issue suggested that the October issue was the best issue of Astounding ever, and Gray Lensman was first place in the Analytical Laboratory statistics "by a lightyear", with three runners-up in a distant tie for second place. The cover was also praised by readers in Brass Tacks, and Campbell noted, "We got a letter from E. E. Smith saying he and [cover artist] Hubert Rogers agreed on how Kinnison looked."

Smith was the guest of honor at Chicon I, the second World Science Fiction Convention, held in Chicago over Labor Day weekend 1940, giving a speech on the importance of science fiction fandom entitled "What Does This Convention Mean?" He attended the convention's masquerade as C. L. Moore's Northwest Smith, and met fans living near him in Michigan, who would later form the Galactic Roamers, which previewed and advised him on his future work.

After Pearl Harbor, Smith discovered he "was one year over age for reinstatement" into the US Army. Instead he worked on high explosives at the Kingsbury Ordnance Plant in La Port, Indiana, at first as a chemical engineer, but gradually worked his way up to chief. In late 1943 he became head of the Inspection Division, and was fired in early 1944.

Smith spent the next few years working on "light farm machinery and heavy tanks for Allis-Chalmers," after which he was hired as manager of the Cereal Mix Division of J. W. Allen & Co., where he worked until his professional retirement in 1957.

=== Retirement and late writing ===
After Smith retired, he and his wife lived in Clearwater, Florida in the fall and winter, driving the smaller of their two trailers to Seaside, Oregon, each April, often stopping at science fiction conventions on the way (Smith did not like to fly). In 1963, he was presented the inaugural First Fandom Hall of Fame award at the 21st World Science Fiction Convention in Washington, D.C. Some of his biography is captured in an essay by Robert A. Heinlein, which was reprinted in the collection Expanded Universe in 1980. A more detailed, although allegedly error-ridden biography is in Sam Moskowitz's Seekers of Tomorrow.

Robert Heinlein and Smith were friends. (Heinlein dedicated his 1958 novel Methuselah's Children "To Edward E. Smith, PhD".) Heinlein reported that E. E. Smith perhaps took his "unrealistic" heroes from life, citing as an example the extreme competence of the hero of Spacehounds of IPC. He reported that E. E. Smith was a large, blond, athletic, very intelligent, very gallant man, married to a remarkably beautiful, intelligent, red-haired woman named MacDougal (thus perhaps the prototypes of 'Kimball Kinnison' and 'Clarissa MacDougal'). In Heinlein's essay, he reports that he began to suspect Smith might be a sort of "superman" when he asked Smith for help in purchasing a car. Smith tested the car by driving it on a back road at illegally high speeds with their heads pressed tightly against the roof columns to listen for chassis squeaks by bone conduction—a process apparently improvised on the spot.

In his novels written after his professional retirement, Galaxy Primes (working title: "The Girl With The Green Hair"), Subspace Explorers, and Subspace Encounter, E. E. Smith explores themes of telepathy and other mental abilities collectively called "psionics", and of the conflict between libertarian and socialistic/communistic influences in the colonization of other planets. Galaxy Primes was written after critics such as Groff Conklin and P. Schuyler Miller in the early '50s accused his fiction of being passé, and he made an attempt to do something more in line with the concepts about which Astounding editor John W. Campbell encouraged his writers to make stories. Despite this, it was rejected by Campbell, and it was eventually published by Amazing Stories in 1959.

Subspace Safari, an unpublished novel intended as a sequel to the novelette "Subspace Survivors", was completed in 1962. Campbell requested substantial revisions before publishing it in Astounding, but Smith declined to make the changes. Because the manuscript incorporated material from the earlier novelette, it could not readily be published elsewhere. Smith subsequently reworked the material, and decided he couldn't fit it all in one book. The first part, Subspace Explorers, was published in 1965, and Smith began work on a sequel. He later set this aside in order to write the fourth Skylark novel, Skylark DuQuesne, which appeared in the June to October 1965 issues of If, introduced by editor Frederik Pohl with a summary of the earlier installments. Smith died before completing the sequel to Subspace Explorers. In 1978, Lloyd Arthur Eshbach was shown a copy of the unfinished manuscript. He then contacted Smith's daughter for more material, and she was able to locate the earlier Subspace Safari. Using this as the basis for Subspace Encounter, Eshbach completed the novel, which was published in 1983.

His late story "The Imperial Stars" (1964), featuring a troupe of circus performers involved in sabotage in a galactic empire, recaptured some of the atmosphere from his earlier works and was intended as the first in a new series, with outlines of later parts rumored to still exist. In fact, the Imperial Stars characters and concepts were continued by author Stephen Goldin as the "Family D'Alembert series". While the book covers indicate the series was written by Smith and Goldin together, Goldin only ever had Smith's original novella to expand upon.

=== Lord Tedric ===
Smith published two novelettes entitled "Tedric" in Other Worlds Science Fiction Stories (1953) and "Lord Tedric" in Universe Science Fiction (1954). These were almost completely forgotten until after Smith's death. In 1975, a compendium of Smith's works was published, entitled The Best of E. E. "Doc" Smith, containing these two short stories, excerpts from several of his major works, and another short story first published in Worlds of If in 1964 entitled "The Imperial Stars".

In Smith's original short stories, Tedric was a smith (both blacksmith and whitesmith) residing in a small town near a castle in a situation roughly equivalent to England of the 1200s. He received instruction in advanced metallurgy from a time-traveler who wanted to change the situation in his own time by modifying certain events of the past. From this instruction, he was able to build better suits of armor and help defeat the villains of the piece. Unlike Eklund's later novels based on these short stories, the original Tedric never left his own time or planet, and fought purely local enemies of his own time period.

A few years later and 13 years after Smith's death, Verna Smith arranged with Gordon Eklund to publish another novel of the same name about the same fictional character, introducing it as "a new series conceived by E. E. 'Doc' Smith". Eklund later went on to publish the other novels in the series, one or two under the pseudonym "E. E. 'Doc' Smith" or "E. E. Smith". The protagonist possesses heroic qualities similar to those of the heroes in Smith's original novels and can communicate with an extra-dimensional race of beings known as the Scientists, whose archenemy is Fra Villion, a mysterious character described as a dark knight, skilled in whip-sword combat, and evil genius behind the creation of a planetoid-sized "iron sphere" armed with a weapon capable of destroying planets. As a result, Smith is believed by many to be the unacknowledged progenitor of themes that would appear in Star Wars. In fact, however, these appear in the sequels written by others after Smith's death.

== Critical opinion ==
Smith's novels are generally considered to be classic space operas, and he is sometimes called the first of the three "novas" of 20th-century science fiction (with Stanley G. Weinbaum and Robert A. Heinlein as the second and third novas).

Heinlein credited him for being his main influence:

I have learned from many writers—from Verne and Wells and Campbell and Sinclair Lewis, et al.—but I have learned more from you than from any of the others and perhaps more than for all the others put together ...

Smith expressed a preference for inventing fictional technologies that were not strictly impossible (so far as the science of the day was aware) but highly unlikely: "the more highly improbable a concept is—short of being contrary to mathematics whose fundamental operations involve no neglect of infinitesimals—the better I like it" was his phrase.

Lensman was one of five finalists when the 1966 World Science Fiction Convention judged Isaac Asimov's Foundation the Best All-Time Series.

The Science Fiction and Fantasy Hall of Fame inducted Smith in 2004.

== Extending the Lensman universe ==
Vortex Blasters (also known as Masters of the Vortex) is set in the same universe as the Lensman novels. It is an extension to the main storyline which takes place between Galactic Patrol and Children of the Lens, and introduces a different type of psionics from that used by the Lensmen. Spacehounds of IPC is not a part of the series, despite occasional erroneous statements to the contrary. (It is listed as a novel in the series in some paperback editions of the 1970s.)

== Influence on science and the military ==
Smith was widely read by scientists and engineers from the 1930s into the 1970s. Literary precursors of ideas which arguably entered the military-scientific complex include SDI (Triplanetary), stealth (Gray Lensman), the OODA loop, C3-based warfare, and the AWACS (Gray Lensman).

An inarguable influence was described in a June 11, 1947, letter to Smith from John W. Campbell (the editor of Astounding, where much of the Lensman series was originally published). In it, Campbell relayed Captain Cal Laning's acknowledgment that he had used Smith's ideas for displaying the battlespace situation (called the "tank" in the stories) in the design of the United States Navy's ships' Combat Information Centers. "The entire set-up was taken specifically, directly, and consciously from the Directrix. In your story, you reached the situation the Navy was in—more communication channels than integration techniques to handle it. You proposed such an integrating technique and proved how advantageous it could be. You, sir, were 100% right. As the Japanese Navy—not the hypothetical Boskonian fleet—learned at an appalling cost."

One underlying theme of the later Lensman novels was the difficulty in maintaining military secrecy—as advanced capabilities are revealed, the opposing side can often duplicate them. This point was also discussed extensively by John Campbell in his letter to Smith. Also in the later Lensman novels, and particular after the "Battle of Klovia" broke the Boskonian's power base at the end of Second Stage Lensmen, the Boskonian forces and particularly Kandron of Onlo reverted to terroristic tactics to attempt to demoralize Civilization, thus providing an early literary glimpse into this modern problem of both law enforcement and military response. The use of "Vee-two" gas by the pirates attacking the Hyperion in Triplanetary (in both magazine and book appearances) also suggests anticipation of the terrorist uses of poison gases. However, Smith lived through WWI, when the use of poison gas on troops was well known to the populace; extending the assumption that pirates might use it if they could obtain it was no great extension of the present-day knowledge.

The beginning of the story Skylark of Space describes in relative detail the protagonist's research into separation of platinum group residues, subsequent experiments involving electrolysis, and the discovery of a process evocative of cold fusion (over 50 years before Stanley Pons and Martin Fleischmann). He describes a nuclear process yielding large amounts of energy and producing only negligible radioactive waste—which then goes on to form the basis of the adventures in the Skylark books. Smith's general description of the process of discovery is highly evocative of Röntgen's descriptions of his discovery of the X-ray.

Another theme of the Skylark novels involves precursors of modern information technology. The humanoid aliens encountered in the first novel have developed a primitive technology called the "mechanical educator", which allows direct conversion of brain waves into intelligible thought for transmission to others or for electrical storage. By the third novel in the series, Skylark of Valeron, this technology has grown into an "Electronic Brain" which is capable of computation on all "bands" of energy—electromagnetism, gravity, and "tachyonic" energy and radiation bands included. This is itself derived from a discussion of reductionist atomic theory in the second novel, Skylark Three, which brings to mind modern quark and sub-quark theories of elementary particle physics.

== Literary influences ==
In his 1947 essay "The Epic of Space", Smith listed (by last name only) authors he enjoyed reading: John W. Campbell, L. Sprague de Camp, Robert A. Heinlein, Murray Leinster, H. P. Lovecraft, and A. Merritt (specifically The Ship of Ishtar, The Moon Pool, The Snake Mother, and Dwellers in the Mirage, as well as the character John Kenton), C. L. Moore (specifically "Jirel of Joiry"), Roman Frederick Starzl, John Taine, A. E. van Vogt, Stanley G. Weinbaum (specifically "Tweerl"), and Jack Williamson. In a passage on his preparation for writing the Lensman novels, he notes that Clinton Constantinescu's "War of the Universe" was not a masterpiece, but says that Starzl and Williamson were masters; this suggests that Starzl's Interplanetary Flying Patrol may have been an influence on Smith's Triplanetary Patrol, later the Galactic Patrol. The feeding of the Overlords of Delgon upon the life-force of their victims at the end of chapter five of Galactic Patrol seems a clear allusion to chapter 29 of The Moon Pool, Merritt's account of the Taithu and the power of love in chapters 29 and 34 also bear some resemblance to the end of Children of the Lens. Smith also mentions Edgar Rice Burroughs, complaining about loose ends at the end of one of his novels.

Smith acknowledges the help of the Galactic Roamers writers' workshop, plus E. Everett Evans, Ed Counts, an unnamed aeronautical engineer, Dr. James Enright, and Dr. Richard W. Dodson. Smith's daughter, Verna, lists the following authors as visitors to the Smith household in her youth: Lloyd Arthur Eshbach, Heinlein, Dave Kyle, Bob Tucker, Williamson, Pohl, Merritt, and the Galactic Roamers. Smith cites Bigelow's Theoretical Chemistry–Fundamentals as a justification for the possibility of the inertialess drive. Also, an extended reference is made to Rudyard Kipling's "Ballad of Boh Da Thone" in Gray Lensman (chapter 22, "Regeneration", in a conversation between Kinnison and MacDougall). Again in Gray Lensman, Smith quotes from Merritt's Dwellers in the Mirage, even name-checking the author:

He could not even pray, with immortal Merritt's Dwayanu, "Luka - turn your wheel so that I need not slay this woman!"

Sam Moskowitz's biographical essay on Smith in Seekers of Tomorrow states that he regularly read Argosy magazine, and everything by H. G. Wells, Jules Verne, H. Rider Haggard, Edgar Allan Poe, and Edgar Rice Burroughs. Moskowitz also notes that Smith's "reading enthusiasms included poetry, philosophy, ancient and medieval history, and all of English literature". (Smith's grandson notes that he spoke, and sang, German.)

Both Moskowitz and Smith's daughter Verna Smith Trestrail report that Smith had a troubled relationship with John Campbell, the editor of Astounding. Smith's most successful works were published under Campbell, but the degree of influence is uncertain. The original outline for the Lensman series had been accepted by F. Orlin Tremaine, and Smith angered Campbell by showing loyalty to Tremaine at his new magazine, Comet, when he sold him "The Vortex Blaster" in 1941. Campbell's announcement of Children of the Lens, in 1947, was less than enthusiastic. Campbell later said that he published it only reluctantly, though he praised it privately, and bought little from Smith thereafter.

== Derivative works and influence on popular culture ==
- Randall Garrett wrote a parody entitled "Backstage Lensman" which Smith reportedly enjoyed. Harry Harrison also parodied Smith's work in the novel Star Smashers of the Galaxy Rangers and the short story "Space Rats of the CCC".
- Arthur C. Clarke's space battle in Earthlight was based on the attack on the Mardonalian fortress in chapter seven of Skylark Three.
- Steve 'Slug' Russell wrote one of the first computer games, Spacewar!, with inspiration from the space battles from the Lensman series.
- The Japanese Lensman anime is more an imitation of Star Wars than a translation of the Lensman novels. Efforts to print translations of the associated manga in the United States in the early 1990s without payment of royalties to the Smith family were successfully blocked in court by Verna Smith Trestrail with the help of several California science-fiction authors and fans.
- In his biography, George Lucas reveals that the Lensman novels were a major influence on his youth. J. Michael Straczynski, creator of the science-fiction television series Babylon 5, also has acknowledged the influence of the Lensman books.
- Superman creator Jerry Siegel was impressed, at an early age, with the optimistic vision of the future presented in Skylark of Space.
- An attempt to create a feature film based on the Lensman series by Ron Howard's Imagine Entertainment and Universal Studios began in 2008 with J. Michael Straczynski, the creator of Babylon 5, as writer, but in 2014 the project was scrapped because of budget limitations.
- In her short Pliocene Companion book, author Julian May explained that a major character in her Exile series written in the early 1980s, Marc Remillard, was strongly influenced by Smith's villain character from Skylark DuQuesne, Marc DuQuesne. This was somewhat of a tribute to Smith. May had written an early science fiction short story called "Dune Roller" in 1950, and had attended several science fiction conventions in the early '50s, where she met and came to know Smith personally.
- The 2019 album All Aboard the Skylark by Hawkwind is named after the stories.

== Appearances in fiction ==
Smith appears as a character in the 2006 novel The Chinatown Death Cloud Peril by Paul Malmont. The novel describes friendship and rivalry among pulp writers of the 1930s. He also appears as "Lensman Ted Smith" in the 1980 novel The Number of the Beast and as "Commander Ted Smith" in the 1985 novel The Cat Who Walks Through Walls, both by Robert A. Heinlein. It is also suggested that he was one of the inspirations for Heinlein's character Lazarus Long.

== Bibliography ==
=== Lensman ===
1. Triplanetary (1948)
2. First Lensman (1950)
3. Galactic Patrol (1950)
4. Gray Lensman (1951)
5. Second Stage Lensmen (1953)
6. The Vortex Blaster (1960)
7. Children of the Lens (1954)

=== Skylark ===
1. The Skylark of Space (1946)
2. Skylark Three (1948)
3. Skylark of Valeron (1949)
4. Skylark DuQuesne (1966)

=== Subspace ===
1. Subspace Explorers (1965)
2. Subspace Encounter (1983)
