= List of space opera media =

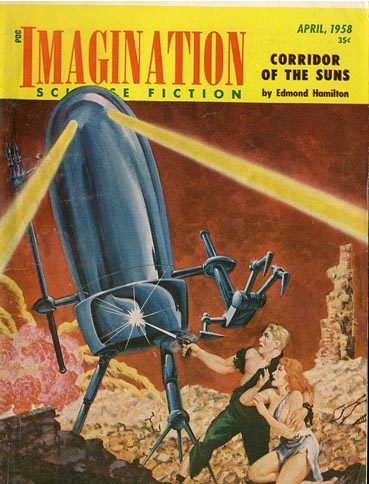
Cover of the science-fiction magazine Imagination, April 1958

Space opera is a subgenre of science fiction that David G. Hartwell and Kathryn Cramer define as "colorful, dramatic, large-scale science fiction adventure, competently and sometimes beautifully written, usually focused on a sympathetic, heroic central character and plot action, and usually set in the relatively distant future, and in space or on other worlds, characteristically optimistic in tone. It often deals with war, piracy, military virtues, and very large-scale action, large stakes."

The following are works that independent commentators have characterized as space opera, ordered chronologically by date of first publication.

== Print ==
These are works of print media.

=== Novels and series ===
- A True Story (c. 150) by Lucian of Samosata
- Somnium (1634) by Johannes Kepler
- Edison's Conquest of Mars (1898) by Garrett P. Serviss
- The Struggle for Empire: A Story of the Year 2236 (1900) by Robert William Cole
- Barsoom (1912-1943) by Edgar Rice Burroughs
- Armageddon 2419 A.D. (Buck Rogers) (1928) by Philip Francis Nowlan
- The Skylark series (1928–1965) by E. E. "Doc" Smith
- Arcot, Wade and Morey (1930–32) by John W. Campbell
- The Lensman series (1934-1948) and The Vortex Blaster (1960) by E. E. Smith
- Empire (1945-1951), and Foundation series (1942–1999) by Isaac Asimov
- Federation series (1952–1964) by H. Beam Piper
- Starship Troopers (1959) by Robert A. Heinlein
- Known Space (1964–present) by Larry Niven
- Dune (1965–present) by Frank Herbert
- The Dag Fletcher series (1966–1976) by John Rankine
- The Dumarest Saga (1967-2008) by E.C. Tubb
- The Cap Kennedy series (1973-1983) by E.C. Tubb (writing as Gregory Kern)
- Alliance-Union universe series (1976–present) and Foreigner universe (1994–present) series by C. J. Cherryh
- The Hitchhiker's Guide to the Galaxy series (1978–present)
- The Uplift Universe novels (1980–98) by David Brin
- Legend of the Galactic Heroes (1982–1989) by Yoshiki Tanaka
- The War Against the Chtorr (1983–present) by David Gerrold
- The Ender's Game series (1985–present) by Orson Scott Card
- Culture series (1987–2012) and The Algebraist (2004) by Iain M. Banks
- Vorkosigan Saga (1987–present) by Lois McMaster Bujold
- Liaden universe series (1988–present) by Sharon Lee and Steve Miller
- Hyperion Cantos series (1989–1996) by Dan Simmons
- The Gap Cycle series (1990–1996) by Stephen R. Donaldson
- Star Wolf (1990–2004) by David Gerrold
- Honorverse series (1992–present) by David Weber
- The Zones of Thought series (1992–present) by Vernor Vinge
- Mars Trilogy (Red, Green, and Blue Mars) (1993–1999) by Kim Stanley Robinson
- Seafort Saga series (1994–2001) by David Feintuch
- Skolian Saga series (1995–present) by Catherine Asaro
- Crest of the Stars series (1996–present) by Hiroyuki Morioka
- Revelation Space series (2001–present) by Alastair Reynolds
- The Golden Oecumene series (2001–2003) by John C. Wright
- Dread Empire's Fall (2002–2005) by Walter Jon Williams
- Saga of Seven Suns (2002–2008) and The Saga of Shadows (2014–present) by Kevin J. Anderson
- Singularity Sky, Iron Sunrise and Saturn's Children (2003–present) by Charles Stross
- Commonwealth Saga (2004–2005) and The Night's Dawn Trilogy (1996–1999) by Peter F. Hamilton
- The Lost Fleet (2006–present) by Jack Campbell
- Remembrance of Earth's Past (2006-2010) by Liu Cixin
- Spiral Arm series (2008–2013) by Michael F. Flynn
- Humanities Fire (2009-2016) by Michael Cobley
- The Expanse (2011–2022) by James S. A. Corey
- A Confusion of Princes (2012) by Garth Nix
- The Illuminae Files series (2013-2016) and Aurora Cycle series (2019–present) by Amie Kaufman and Jay Kristoff
- Imperial Radch (2013–2015) by Ann Leckie
- The Long Way to a Small, Angry Planet (2014) by Becky Chambers
- The Red Rising trilogy (2014-2016) by Pierce Brown; followed by the tetralogy beginning with Iron Gold (2018)
- Expeditionary Force (2016–present) by Craig Alanson
- The Collapsing Empire: The Interdependency series (2017-2020) by John Scalzi
- The Sun Eater (2018–2025) by Christopher Ruocchio
- A Memory Called Empire (2019) by Arkady Martine
- Dragon Pearl (2019) by Yoon Ha Lee
- The Sun Chronicles (2019–present) by Kate Elliott
- The Common Saga (2020–present) by Jeremy Szal
- The Splinter in the Sky (2023) by Kemi Ashing-Giwa

=== Anthologies and collections ===
- Space Opera (1974) by Brian Aldiss
- The Space Opera Renaissance (2006) by David G. Hartwell and Kathryn Cramer
- The New Space Opera (2007) by Gardner Dozois and Jonathan Strahan (2007)
- The New Space Opera 2 (2009) by Gardner Dozois and Jonathan Strahan

=== Short fiction ===
- Buck Rogers series (1928–present) by Philip Francis Nowlan and others
- Perry Rhodan series (1961–present) in German by K. H. Scheer and Clark Darlton.
- Berserker series (1967–2005) by Fred Saberhagen
- Graff series (2021-2023) by Carrie Vaughn.

=== Comics and manga ===
- Buck Rogers (1929-1967)
- Flash Gordon series (1934–present) by Alex Raymond and others
- Dan Dare (1950–2008), created by Frank Hampson
- Perry Rhodan (1961–present), created by K. H. Scheer and Walter Ernsting
- Lone Sloane (1966), created by Philippe Druillet
- Valérian and Laureline (1967–present) by Pierre Christin and Jean-Claude Mézières
- Guardians of the Galaxy (1969–present) by Marvel Comics
- Adam Warlock (1975–1977) by Jim Starlin
- Space Adventure Cobra (1978–1984) by Buichi Terasawa
- Mobile Suit Gundam (1979–1980) by Yoshiyuki Tomino
- Dreadstar (1980–1988) by Jim Starlin
- The Incal (1981–present) by Alejandro Jodorowsky
- Nexus (1981–present) by Mike Baron and Steve Rude
- Atari Force (1982–1986) by Gerry Conway, Roy Thomas, Ross Andru, Gil Kane, Dick Giordano, Mike DeCarlo, José Luis García-López, Eduardo Barreto, Keith Giffen, Robert Loren Fleming, and Karl Kesel
- Starstruck (1982–2010) by Elaine Lee and Michael Kaluta
- Starjammers (1990; 1995–1996; 2004–2005) by Terry Kavanagh; Warren Ellis; Kevin J. Anderson
- Metabarons (1992–2003) by Alejandro Jodorowsky
- The Cyann Cycle (1993–present) by François Bourgeon
- War of Kings (2009) by Dan Abnett, C. B. Cebulski, Andy Lanning, and Christopher Yost
- Saga (2012–present) by Brian K. Vaughan and Fiona Staples
- Samurai 8: The Tale of Hachimaru (2019–2020) by Masashi Kishimoto
- Schlock Mercenary (2000-2020) by Howard Taylor
- The Amory Wars (2004–present) by Claudio Sanchez
- HK (1996-2012) by Kevin Hérault and Jean-David Morvan.
- Imperial (2025) by Jonathan Hickman

== Film and television ==
=== Film series ===
- Flash Gordon (1936–1980; 3 serial films and one feature film based on comic strip)
- Super Giant (1957-1959; 9 films)
- Dr. Who (Dalek films) (1965–1966; 2 films)
- Planet of the Apes (1968–present; 10 films)
- Space Odyssey (1968-1984; 2 films)
- Star Wars (1977–present; 14 films)
- Star Trek (1979–present; 14 films)
- Dune (1984–present; 3 films)
- Transformers (1986–present; 8 films based on Toyline)
- Avatar (2009–present; 3 films)
- Guardians of the Galaxy (2014–2023; 3 films)
- Rebel Moon (2023–present; 2 films)

=== One-shot films ===
- Warning from Space (1956)
- The Mysterians (1957)
- Battle in Outer Space (1959)
- Gorath (1962)
- Barbarella (1968)
- Solaris (1972)
- Silent Running (1972)
- Dark Star (1974)
- Flesh Gordon (1974)
- Starcrash (1978)
- The Black Hole (1979)
- Buck Rogers in the 25th Century (1979)
- Battle Beyond the Stars (1980)
- The Last Starfighter (1984)
- Starchaser: The Legend of Orin (1985)
- Spaceballs (1987)
- Stargate (1994)
- The Fifth Element (1997)
- Galaxy Quest (1999)
- Titan A.E. (2000)
- Treasure Planet (2002)
- Serenity (2005)
- The Hitchhiker's Guide to the Galaxy (2005)
- WALL-E (2008)
- John Carter (2012)
- Ender's Game (2013)
- Jupiter Ascending (2015)
- Thor: Ragnarok (2017)
- Valerian and the City of a Thousand Planets (2017)
- Cosmoball (2020)
- John Vardar vs the Galaxy (2024)

=== Television ===
- Space Patrol (March 1950 to February 1955)
- Rocky Jones, Space Ranger (1954)
- Commando Cody: Sky Marshal of the Universe (1955)
- Flash Gordon (1954–2008)
- Planet Prince (1958-1959)
- Fireball XL5 (1962–1963)
- Space Patrol (1962–1963)
- Doctor Who (1963–present)
- Lost in Space (1965–1968, 2018–2021)
- Star Trek (1966–present)
- Space Ghost (1966–1967)
- Space: 1999 (1975–1977)
- Blake's 7 (1978–1981)
- Battlestar Galactica (1978–2013)
- Buck Rogers in the 25th Century (1979–1981)
- The Hitchhiker's Guide to the Galaxy (1981)
- The Transformers (1984–1987)
- Star Wars (1985–present)
- SilverHawks (1986)
- Frank Herbert's Dune and Frank Herbert's Children of Dune (2000–2003)
- Red Dwarf (1988–present)
- Babylon 5 (1993–1998)
- Space: Above and Beyond (1995, one season)
- Lexx (1997–2002)
- Stargate (1997–2011)
- Shadow Raiders (1998–1999)
- Crusade (1999)
- Lavender Castle (1999–2000)
- Farscape (1999-2003)
- Futurama (1999–present)
- Zenon trilogy (1999-2004)
- Andromeda (2000–2005)
- Firefly (2002)
- Halo (since 2001, started from video game)
- Spaceballs: The Animated Series (2008–2009)
- Killjoys (2015–2019)
- Dark Matter (2015–2017)
- The Expanse (2015–2022)
- The Orville (2017–2019)
- Final Space (2018–2021)
- Another Life (2019–2022)
- Vagrant Queen (2020)
- Foundation (2021–present)

=== Anime ===
- Prince Planet (1965) created by Eiken
- Cyborg 009 (1966) created by Toei Animation
- Gatchaman (1972) created by Tatsunoko Production
- Space Battleship Yamato (1974–present) created by Yoshinobu Nishizaki and Leiji Matsumoto
- Space Pirate Captain Harlock (1978-2014), Galaxy Express 999 (1978-2005), Queen Emeraldas (1998-1999), and Queen Millennia (1981-1982) created by Leiji Matsumoto
- Gundam (1979–present) created by Yoshiyuki Tomino and Hajime Yatate
- Dirty Pair (1980-2018) created by Haruka Takachiho
- Toward the Terra (1980–2007) original manga series by Keiko Takemiya
- Macross (1982–present) created by Shoji Kawamori, and its U.S. counterpart Robotech (1985-2013) adapted by Carl Macek
- Space Adventure Cobra (1982–2010) created by Buichi Terasawa
- Armored Trooper VOTOMS (1983–1984) created by Ryosuke Takahashi
- Odin: Photon Sailer Starlight (1985) created by Yoshinobu Nishizaki
- Legend of the Galactic Heroes (1988–present) original novel by Yoshiki Tanaka
- Tenchi Muyo! (1992–2014) created by Masaki Kajishima and Hiroki Hayashi
- The Irresponsible Captain Tylor (1993–present) original light novel by Hitoshi Yoshioka
- Ginga Sengoku Gun'yūden Rai (1994–1995)
- Martian Successor Nadesico (1996–1997) created by Kia Asamiya
- Cowboy Bebop (1998) created by Shinichirō Watanabe
- Outlaw Star and Angel Links (1998–1999) created by Takehiko Itō
- Crest of the Stars, Banner of the Stars, Seikai no Danshō (1999–2005) created by Hiroyuki Morioka
- Vandread (2000–2002) created by Gonzo and Media Factory
- Sonic X (2003–2004) based on Sonic the Hedgehog created by TMS Entertainment
- Starship Operators (2005) produced by J.C.Staff, original Manga series by Ryo Mizuno
- Heroic Age (2007) created by Tow Ubukata
- Time Jam: Valerian & Laureline (2007-2008) based on Valérian and Laureline created by Pierre Christin and Jean-Claude Mézières.
- Tytania (2008–2009) original light novel by Yoshiki Tanaka
- Space Dandy (2014)
- Aldnoah.Zero (2014)
- Knights of Sidonia (2015)

=== Actual Play Tabletop Role-playing Games (TTRPGs) ===
- The Nautilus Ark: A Johnson Corp Odyssey (2021) Critical Role one-shot (Mothership/Alien: The Roleplaying Game homebrew)
- A Starstruck Odyssey (2022) Dimension 20 campaign (Dungeons and Dragons 5th edition)

== Radio ==
- Buck Rogers in the 25th Century (1932-1947)
- The Hitchhiker's Guide to the Galaxy (1978–present)
- Space Patrol (4 October 1952 to 19 March 1955)

== Podcasts ==
- Sparks Nevada, Marshall on Mars by Thrilling Adventure Hour
- Mission to Zyxx by Maximum Fun
- Wolf 359 by Kinda Evil Genius Productions

== Games ==
=== Social ===
- Outernauts (2012–2016) created by Insomniac Games

=== Tabletop ===
==== Boardgames / Wargames ====
- Stellar Conquest (1974)
- BattleTech (1984–present) FASA Corporation
- Renegade Legion (1989–1993) FASA Corporation
- Twilight Imperium (1998–present) Fantasy Flight Games
- Risk: Star Wars: Clone Wars Edition (2005) Hasbro, Winning Moves
- Risk: Star Wars Original Trilogy Edition (2006) Hasbro, Winning Moves
- Race for the Galaxy (2007–present) Rio Grande Games
- Eclipse (2011) Asmodee
- Space Empires: 4X (2011) GMT Games
- Risk: Mass Effect Galaxy at War Edition (2013) Hasbro, Winning Moves

==== Roleplaying Games ====
- Traveller (1977–present) Game Designers' Workshop - The classic and quintessential Space Opera roleplaying game.
- Space Opera (1980–present) Fantasy Games Unlimited
- 2300 AD (1986) Game Designers' Workshop - Hard Science Fiction version of Twilight: 2000.
- Space: 1889 (1988-2011) Game Designers' Workshop - Steampunk Space Opera.
- Battlelords of the 23rd Century (1990–Present) Optimus Design Studios
- Rifts Phase World (1990–present) Palladium Books
- Fading Suns (1996-) Holistic Design
- Alternity (1998-2000) TSR
- GURPS Transhuman Space (2002) Steve Jackson Games - Transhumanist Space Opera.
- D6 Space Opera / D6 Space (2003/2004–present) West End Games - Generic version of the D6-based system used for Star Wars: The Roleplaying Game (1987-1998) and Shatterzone (?-1997).
- Serenity and Firefly RPGs (2005-2015) Margaret Weis Productions, Ltd
- Eclipse Phase (2009–present) Catalyst Game Labs / Posthuman Studios
- Forbidden Stars (2015) Fantasy Flight Games
- Starfinder Roleplaying Game (2017–present) Paizo Publishing - Science Fiction version of Pathfinder.

==== Collectable Card Games ====
- Star Trek Customizable Card Game (1994-2007) Decipher, Inc.
- Star Wars Customizable Card Game (1995-2001) Decipher, Inc.
- WARS Trading Card Game (2004-2005) Decipher, Inc. - Generic version of the SW:CCG.

=== Video Games ===
- Elite (1984–present) created by David Braben and Ian Bell
- Metroid (1986–present) created by Nintendo
- Starflight (1986-1991) created by Binary Systems and Electronic Arts
- Phantasy Star (1987–present) created by Sega.
- F-Zero (1990) created by Nintendo.
- Star Control (1990-1996) created by Toys for Bob and Legend Entertainment
- Wing Commander (1990–2007) created by Origin Systems, Inc.
- Master of Orion (1993–present) created by Simtex
- Star Fox (series) (1993–present) created by Nintendo
- Marathon Trilogy (1994-1996) created by Bungie
- Mega Man V (1994) created by Capcom
- Star Ocean (1996–present) created by tri-Ace
- StarCraft (1998–present) created by Blizzard Entertainment
- Sid Meier's Alpha Centauri (1999) created by Firaxis Games
- X (game series) (1999–present) created by Egosoft
- Homeworld (1999–2003) created by Relic Entertainment
- Starlancer (2000) and Freelancer (2003) created by Digital Anvil
- Halo (2001–present) created by Bungie and 343 Industries
- Space Rangers 2002 created by Elemental Games
- Ratchet & Clank (2002–present) created by Insomniac Games
- EVE Online (2003–present) created by CCP Games
- Galactic Civilizations (2003–present) created by Stardock
- Space Station 13 (2003)
- Star Wars: Knights of the Old Republic (2003–2014) created by LucasArts and BioWare
- Xenosaga (2003–2006) created by Monolith Soft
- Star Sonata (2004) developed by Adam Miller
- Advent Rising (2005) created by Majesco
- Sword of the Stars (2006) created by Kerberos Productions
- Mass Effect (2007–present) created by BioWare
- Super Mario Galaxy (2007) and Super Mario Galaxy 2 (2010) created by Nintendo
- Dead Space (2008–2013) created by EA Redwood Shores and Glen Schofield
- Sins of a Solar Empire (2008–present) created by Stardock
- Infinite Space (2009) created by Nude Maker
- Sonic Colors (2010) created by Sega
- Darkstar: The Interactive Movie (2010) created by Parallax Studio
- Star Citizen (2011–present) created by Cloud Imperium Games
- Endless Space (2012) created by Amplitude Studios
- FTL: Faster Than Light (2012) created by Subset Games
- Destiny (2014–present) created by Bungie
- Xenoblade Chronicles X (2015) created by Monolith Soft
- Starbound (2016) created by Chucklefish
- Stellaris (video game) (2016–present) created by Paradox Interactive
- No Man's Sky (2016–present) created by Hello Games
- Starfield (2023) created by Bethesda Game Studios
- Honkai: Star Rail (2023–present) created by miHoYo

== Music ==
- 01011001 by Ayreon
- Into The Electric Castle by Ayreon
- Space Metal by Arjen Anthony Lucassen
- Star One project by Arjen Anthony Lucassen
- Universal Migrator Part 1: The Dream Sequencer by Ayreon
- Universal Migrator Part 2: Flight of the Migrator by Ayreon
- The Source (Ayreon album) by Ayreon
- Space 1992: Rise of the Chaos Wizards by Gloryhammer
- Legends from Beyond the Galactic Terrorvortex by Gloryhammer
- The Rise and Fall of Ziggy Stardust and the Spiders from Mars by David Bowie
- Songs from the Black Hole by Weezer
- The Vice Quadrant: A Space Opera by Steam Powered Giraffe
- Ziltoid the Omniscient by Devin Townsend
- The Devin Townsend Project Ziltoid: Dark Matters by Devin Townsend
- Metropolis Saga by Janelle Monáe
- The Mission by Styx
- Splendor & Misery by Clipping
- IRIS: A Space Opera by Justice by Justice
