= List of science fiction television programs =

This is an inclusive list of television programs with science fiction as principal theme, or which contain at least one significant element of science fiction, even if some cross over into other genres.
For television programs with fantasy, horror, mystery, paranormal, supernatural and other related themes, please see the respective genres and listings.

Science fiction films, one-time presentations, original net animation (ONA), original video animation (OVA), short films (a.k.a. shorts), serial films (a.k.a. serials) and specials must have been created specifically for or broadcast first (premiere, "first showing") on television or on a streaming channel to qualify for the purpose of this list.
Films that premiered ("first presentation") on the "big screen" (theatrical release) or have been distributed direct-to-video (video cassette, tape, betamax, VHS, laser disc, video CD, DVD, HD-DVD, Blu-ray, UHD, digital, etc.) or on the internet do not belong here, even if they aired ("second presentation", rerun) at some point on a TV/streaming channel. Please see the lists of science fiction films for more details.

== See also ==
=== Listings ===
- Television films:
  - List of science fiction television films
  - List of television programs based on films
  - List of films based on television programs
- Television networks:
  - Lists of television channels
  - List of Sci Fi Channel (Australia) programs
  - List of Syfy Universal (France) programs
  - List of Syfy (United Kingdom) programmes
  - List of Syfy (United States) programs
  - List of Sci Fi Pictures original films
- Genres:
  - List of science fiction themes
  - List of alternate history fiction: TV shows
  - List of apocalyptic, post-apocalyptic and World War III science fiction television programs
  - List of cyberpunk works: Animation
  - List of cyberpunk works: Television and Web Series
  - List of fiction containing teleportation: Television
  - List of fictional automobiles: Graphic novels, comics & animation
  - List of fictional automobiles: Television and radio
  - List of fictional computers: Television
  - List of fictional extraterrestrials
  - List of fictional robots and androids: Animated shorts/series
  - List of fictional robots and androids: Television films and series
  - List of fictional gynoids: In animation
  - List of fictional gynoids: In US television
  - List of fictional spacecraft
  - List of fictional universes
  - List of fictional vehicles: Television
  - List of military science fiction works and authors: Television and film
  - List of nuclear holocaust fiction: Animation shorts
  - List of nuclear holocaust fiction: Television programs
  - List of science fiction sitcoms
  - List of space opera media: Anime
  - List of space opera media: Film and television
  - List of steampunk works: In television
  - List of time travel science fiction: Television series
  - List of science fiction genres
- Comics based:
  - List of television series based on DC Comics publications
  - List of television series based on Marvel Comics publications
- Countries/Regions:
  - List of television programs
  - List of Australian television series: Science fiction
  - List of British television series
  - List of English-language Canadian television series
  - List of French-language Canadian television series
  - List of science fiction TV and radio shows produced in Canada
  - List of Colombian television series
  - List of Finnish television series
  - List of French television series
  - List of television stations in India
  - List of Hong Kong television series
  - List of Hungarian television series
  - List of Japanese television series
  - List of Lebanese television series
  - List of Philippine television shows
  - List of Puerto Rican television series
  - List of South Korean television series
  - List of Norwegian television series
  - List of New Zealand television series
  - List of South African television series
  - List of Spanish television series
  - List of Swedish television series
- Animated:
  - List of animated television series
  - List of animated television series from 2000s
  - List of animated short series
  - Television networks:
    - List of programs broadcast by Boomerang
    - List of programs broadcast by Cartoon Network
    - List of programs broadcast by Cartoon Quest
    - List of Cookie Jar Entertainment programs
    - List of programs broadcast by Disney XD
    - List of programs broadcast by Fox Kids
    - List of programs broadcast by Kids' WB
    - List of programs broadcast by Jetix
    - List of programs broadcast by Nickelodeon
    - List of programs broadcast by Nicktoons
    - List of programs broadcast by Nick Jr.
    - List of programs broadcast by The N
    - List of programs broadcast by TeenNick
    - List of programs broadcast by Toon Disney

=== Locations ===
- Countries:
  - Australasian science fiction television
  - British television science fiction
  - Canadian science fiction television
  - Continental European science fiction television
  - Japanese television science fiction: Anime
  - Japanese television science fiction (tokusatsu): Live-action
  - U.S. television science fiction
- Television networks:
  - AXN Beyond (Asia-Pacific)
  - AXN Sci Fi (Europe)
  - SyFy network:
    - Sci Fi Channel (Australia)
    - Syfy Universal (Benelux)
    - Sci Fi Channel (Germany)
    - Universal Channel (Japan)
    - Sci Fi Channel (Latin America)
    - Sci Fi Channel (Philippines)
    - Sci Fi Channel (Poland)
    - Syfy Universal (Portugal)
    - Sci Fi Channel (Romania)
    - Syfy Universal (Russia)
    - Sci Fi Channel (Serbia)
    - Syfy Universal (Spain)
  - SPACE (Canada)
  - TV4 Science fiction (Sweden)
  - Zone Fantasy (Italy)

=== Genres ===
- Science fiction on television
- Alien invasion
- Alternate future
- Alternate History: Television
- Anthology series: Television
- Artificial intelligence in fiction
- Augmented reality: Television & film
- Biopunk: Film and television
- Comic science fiction: Television
- Cyberpunk: Film and television
- Cyborgs in fiction: Television
- Extraterrestrials in fiction
- Feminist science fiction: Film and television
- Fictional universe
- Flying car (fiction): Science fiction
- Gender in speculative fiction: Television
- Hyperspace
- Interstellar war
- Invisibility in fiction: Television
- LGBT themes in speculative fiction: Television
- Lost World
- Mecha anime
- Military science fiction
- Mind uploading
- Nuclear weapons in popular culture: In fiction, film and theater
- Nuclear weapons in popular culture: List of visual depictions
- Parallel universe: Television
- Planetary romance: In film and television
- Planets in science fiction
- Real Robot
- Resizing
- Science fantasy
- Science fiction Western: Television
- Sex and sexuality in speculative fiction
- Slipstream
- Space marine: Films and TV
- Space opera
- Space stations and habitats in popular culture
- Space warfare in fiction: Television and movies
- Space western: Television
- Spy-fi: Anime
- Spy-fi: Films and television series
- Steampunk
- Super Robot
- Superhero fiction: Animation
- Superhero fiction: Live-action television series
- Superhuman: Science fiction
- Time travel in fiction
- UFOs in fiction: Television
- Utopian and dystopian fiction
- Virtual reality: Television
- Wormholes in fiction: Television
- Zombie apocalypse: Television

=== Animation ===
- Animation
- Anime
- Adult animation
- Animated series
- Television networks:
  - ABC Kids (US)
  - BBC Kids (Canada)
  - Boing (Italy)
  - Cartoon Network (US)
  - CBBC (UK)
  - CBS Kidshow (US)
  - Chutti TV (India)
  - Disney Channel (US)
  - Disney XD (US)
  - Filmation (US)
  - Kix! (UK)
  - TEENick (US)
  - Teletoon (English) (Canada)
  - Télétoon (French) (Canada)
  - Toon Disney (US)
  - Tooncast (Latin America)
  - UPN Kids (US)
  - USA Action Extreme Team (US)
  - USA Cartoon Express (US)
  - YTV (Canada)
