= Angus McSix =

International power metal band

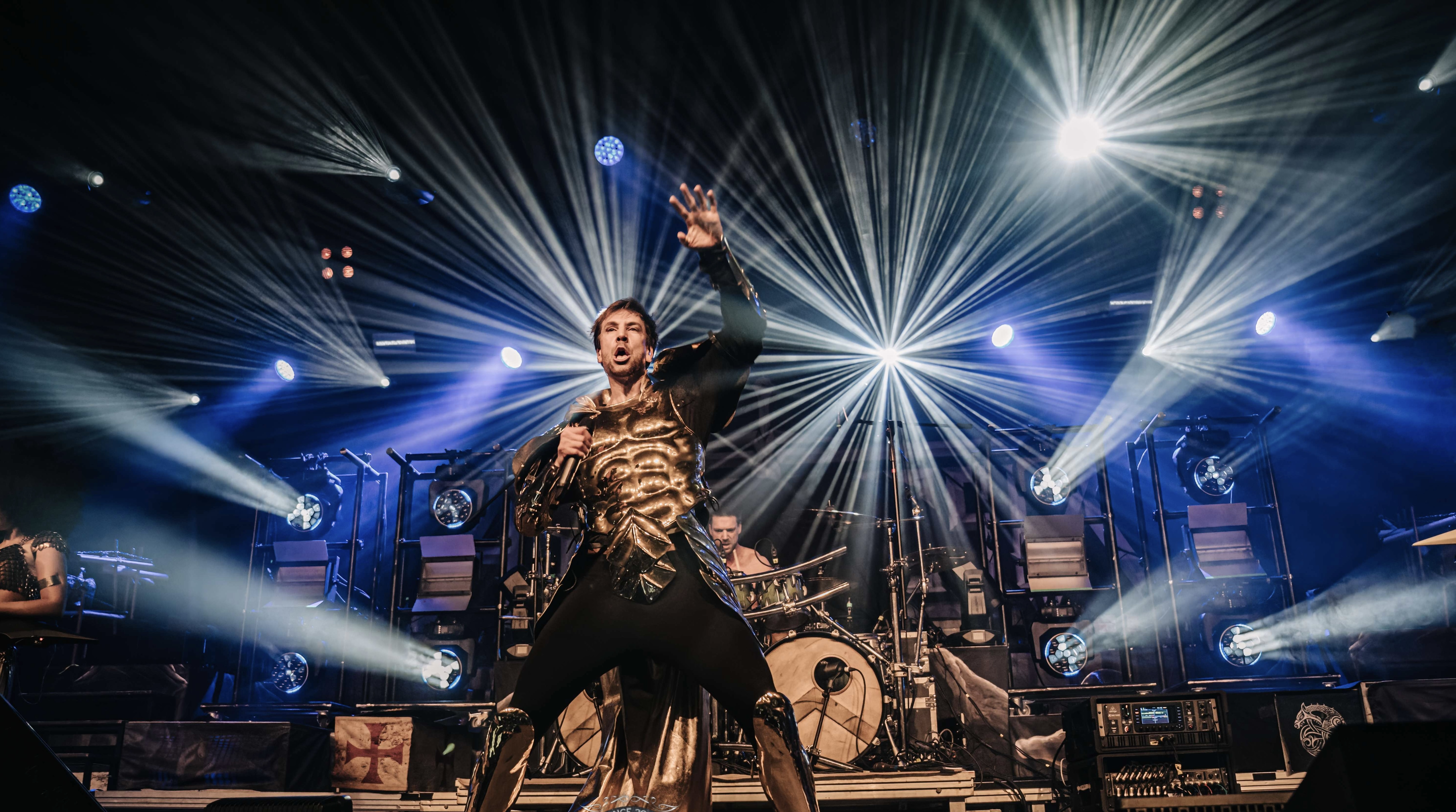
- Angus McSix on their debut tour 2023

Background information
- Origin: Switzerland, Germany, Italy
- Genres: Power metal, symphonic metal
- Years active: 2021–present
- Label: Napalm Records
- Members: Sebastian "Seeb" Levermann; Sam Nyman; Gerit Lamm; Jasmin Pabst
- Past members: Thalia Bellazecca; Thomas Winkler; Manu Lotter
- Website: angusmcsix.net

Angus McSix is an international power metal band formed by Swiss singer Thomas Winkler and German producer, vocalist and guitarist Sebastian "Seeb" Levermann. The debut studio album, Angus McSix and the Sword of Power, was released on 21 April 2023 through Napalm Records. The band members each embody a character in the concept story told through this album.

== History ==
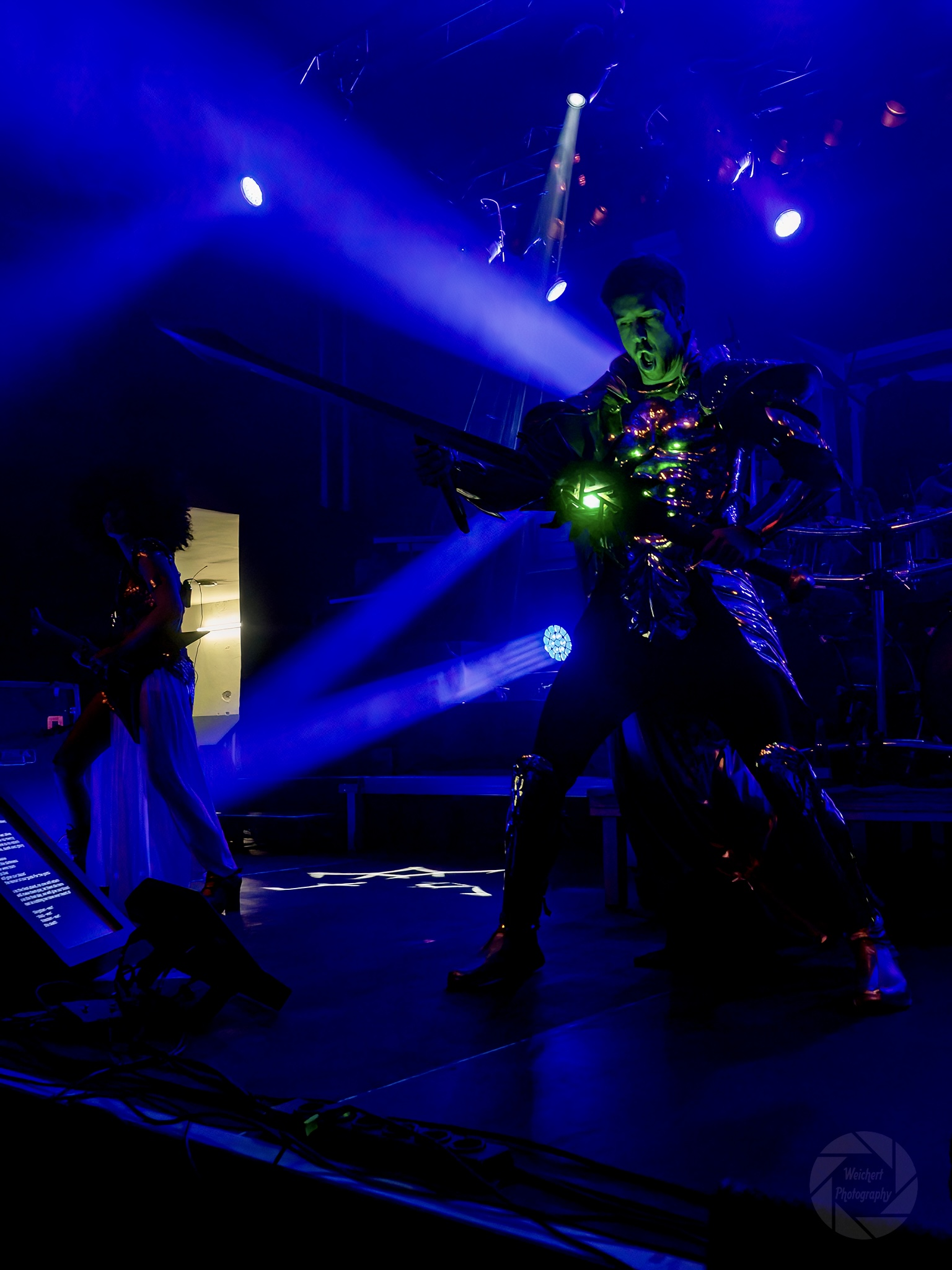
Angus McSix with Sixcalibur

Angus McSix was formed in August 2021 after the split of ex-Gloryhammer frontman Thomas Winkler and his fellow musicians. The leader of the German band Orden Ogan, Sebastian "Seeb" Levermann, contacted Winkler with the idea of forming a new power metal supergroup. He suggested Angus McSix as the band's name, in reference to the stage character Angus McFife embodied by him so far. The name arguably reveals the continuation of Winkler's previous stage character, but also indicates with a pun in the band's lyrics that the character has received an upgrade (becoming "one better", as Fife is phonetically similar and one letter off Five) and will henceforth persist as a more powerful version of himself. To realize the story and complete the band, the two founders recruited Italian guitarist Thalia Bellazecca (ex-Frozen Crown) and Manu Lotter, the former drummer of the band Rhapsody of Fire.

On 21 April 2023, Angus McSix's debut studio album was released under the Napalm Records label, entitled Angus McSix and the Sword of Power. This refers to the content of the song lyrics, which continues the story of the fictional Scottish crown prince Angus McFife XIII after he died a hero's death at the end of the Gloryhammer album last sung by Winkler and now returns from the realm of the dead as a stronger version of himself with the name Angus McSix. The album reached number ten in the German album charts, number 16 in the Swiss album charts and number 26 in the Austrian album charts, making it the most successful debut by a power metal band in those countries. It also reached number 24 in the UK rock and metal charts.

On 7 January 2025, the band released a new single, "6666", from their upcoming album due in 2026. It was also announced that Winkler was stepping down from the band to spend more time with his family, and was replaced by Sam Nyman (Adam McSix). In addition, Lotter had also departed the band and was replaced by Gerit Lamm (Ork Zero). On 30 September, the band released another single, "The Fire of Yore", and announced new guitarist Jasmin Pabst (The Dwarf). The band's second studio album, Angus McSix and the All-Seeing Astral Eye, was released on March 13, 2026.

On 13 July 2026, Bellazecca announced she had left the band to focus on other musical commitments.

== Music style ==
Angus McSix's style is influenced by both late 1990s power metal and modern disco elements. Others see parallels in their music to Sonata Arctica or Blind Guardian. The vocals are powerful, multi-faceted and clear, and have been described by reviewers as groundbreaking for the genre and compared to Rob Halford or Ronnie James Dio. The structure of the songs are mostly in classic verse form.

== Band members ==
Current

- Sebastian "Seeb" Levermann (Archdemon Seebulon, The Origin of All Evil) – guitars, bass, backing vocals (2021–present)
- Sam Nyman (Prince Adam McSix) – vocals (2025–present)
- Gerit Lamm (Ork Zero) – drums (2025–present)
- Jasmin Pabst (The Dwarf) – guitars (2025–present)

Live

- Rafael Dobbs Roa (Archdemon Seebulon) – guitars, backing vocals (2025–present)

Former

- Thalia Bellazecca (Thalestris, Queen of the Lazer-Amazons of Caledonia) – guitars (2021–2026)
- Thomas Winkler (Angus McSix, Starlord of the Sixtus Stellar System) – vocals (2021–2025)
- Manu Lotter (Skaw!, Buff Berserker from the North) – drums (2021–2025)

== Discography ==
=== Studio albums ===
| Title | Album details | Peak chart positions | | | |
| Title | Album details | GER | SWI | AUT | UK Rock |
|---|---|---|---|---|---|
| Angus McSix and the Sword of Power | Released: April 21, 2023; Label: Napalm | 10 | 16 | 26 | 24 |
| Angus McSix and the All-Seeing Astral Eye | Released: March 13, 2026; Label: Napalm | 5 | — | 27 | — |

=== Singles ===
List of singles, showing year released and album/EP name
| Title | Year | Album | Ref. |
|---|---|---|---|
| "Master of the Universe" | 2023 | Angus McSix and the Sword of Power | |
| "Sixcalibur" | 2023 | Angus McSix and the Sword of Power | |
| "Laser-Shooting Dinosaur" | 2023 | Angus McSix and the Sword of Power | |
| "Ride to Hell" | 2023 | Angus McSix and the Sword of Power | |
| "6666" | 2025 | Angus McSix and the All-Seeing Astral Eye | |
| "The Fire of Yore" | 2025 | Angus McSix and the All-Seeing Astral Eye | |
| "I Am Adam McSix" (feat. Rhapsody of Fire) | 2025 | Angus McSix and the All-Seeing Astral Eye | |
| "Dig Down" (feat. Van Canto) | 2026 | Angus McSix and the All-Seeing Astral Eye | |

=== Music videos ===
- "Master of the Universe"
- "Sixcalibur"
- "Laser-Shooting Dinosaur"
- "Ride to Hell"
- "6666"
- "The Fire of Yore"
- "I Am Adam McSix" (feat. Rhapsody of Fire)
- "Dig Down" (feat. Van Canto)
