= Galactic empire =

Fictional government system in science fiction

Galactic empires are a science fiction setting trope, in which most or all of the habitable planets in the setting's galaxy are ruled by a single centralized political entity. Galactic empires most frequently appear in works in the sub-genres of science fantasy and space opera, although they may appear in other sub-genres as well. Works featuring galactic empires may have them as the story's focus, chronicling the empire's growth and/or decline. Alternatively, they may merely serve as a backdrop against which the events of the story play out.

== Notable examples ==
=== Early space opera ===
Several space opera works of the early 20th century feature the plot point of a spacefaring empire, emperor, or other interstellar state. The earliest, Robert W. Cole's The Struggle for Empire (1900), depicts the British Empire ascending to outer space, conquering solar systems and defending against its only rival. (Note: The Struggle for Empire describes empires ruling the universe. As of 1900 (before astronomy's Great Debate) the Milky Way galaxy was held to be the entire universe.) Another, Edmond Hamilton's Interstellar Patrol (1928–34), imagines a galactic Federation of Stars overseen by a Council of Suns and its chief. "The Emperor of the Stars" (1931), by Arthur Zagat and Nat Schachner, portrays a universe under the rule of a despotic alien emperor.

=== Foundation ===
Galactic empires are in many cases consciously modeled on historical Earth-bound empires. Asimov stated explicitly that the Galactic Empire whose fall is depicted in his Foundation books is also modeled on the Roman Empire, with the author taking direct inspiration from the historical writings of Edward Gibbon, even to the point of basing some individual characters on historical figures. Specifically, Pebble in the Sky, which is set on Earth – a poor and backward province of the Galactic Empire – is modeled on Roman-ruled Judea in the 1st century AD. Asimov's Earth – like the historical Judea – is sharply polarized between those who accept the Imperial authority and the fanatic "Zealots" who hatch violent plots of bloody rebellion and are the book's clear villains.

=== Star Wars ===
As a military dictatorship based upon fear and terror, the Galactic Empire is an explicitly villainous force with stylings directly reminiscent of Nazi Germany. For example, its foot soldiers are called stormtroopers after the Nazi Sturmabteilung, and imperial enforcer Darth Vader wears a helmet modeled on the German Stahlhelm.
