= Thomas Winkler =

Swiss singer

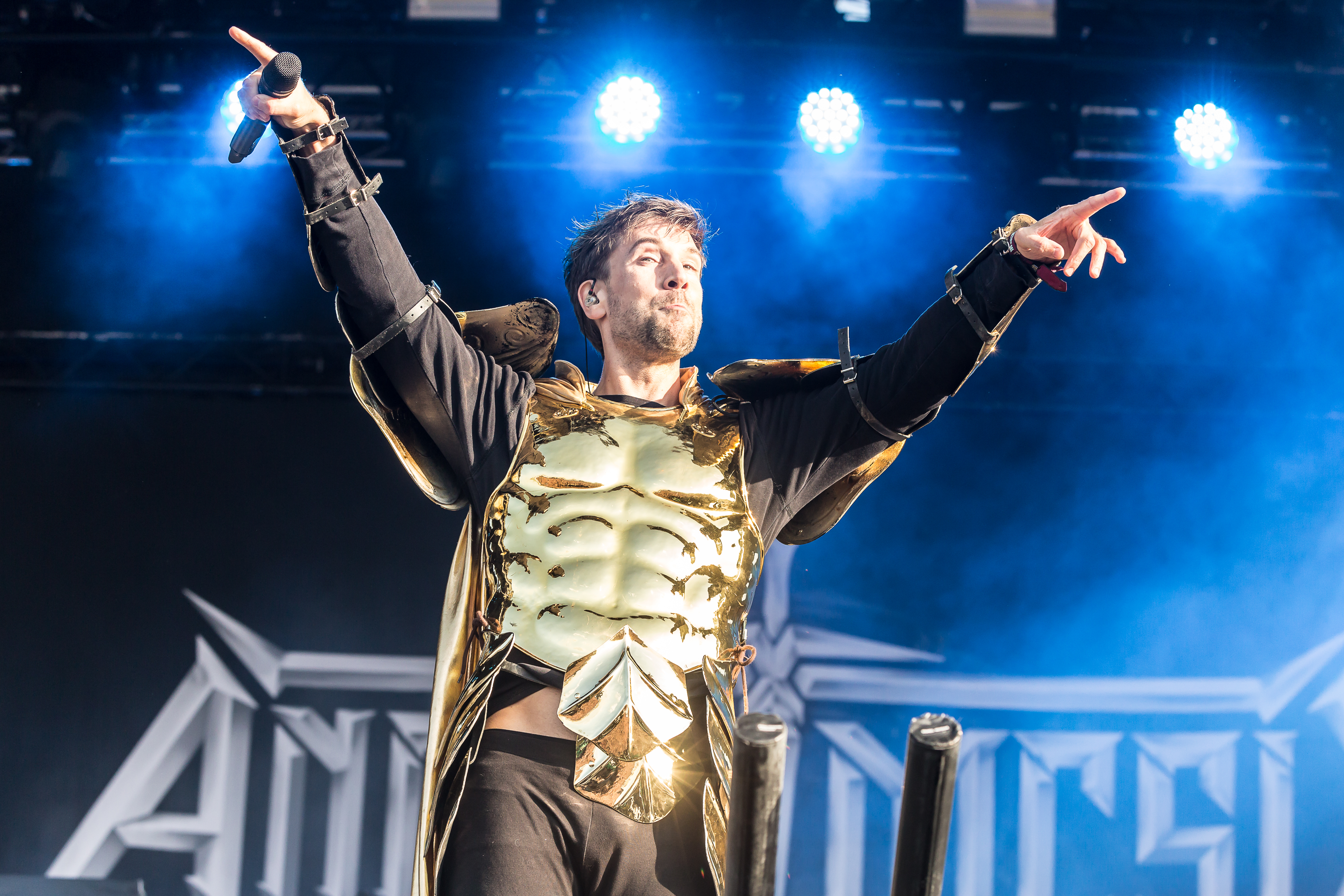
- Winkler with Angus McSix at Rockharz 2023

Background information
- Born: 20 November 1985 (age 40); Zollikofen, Bern, Switzerland
- Genres: Heavy metal; hard rock; power metal; speed metal; symphonic metal; neoclassical metal
- Occupation: Singer
- Years active: 2009–2025
- Formerly of: Angus McSix; Emerald; Gloryhammer
- Website: thomaswinkler.net

Thomas Laszlo Winkler (born 20 November 1985) is a Swiss singer. He is known for being the former vocalist of both power metal bands Angus McSix and Gloryhammer, playing the roles of "Angus McFife, Prince of the Land of Fife" and his descendant "Angus McFife XIII" in the band's internal story.

== Biography ==
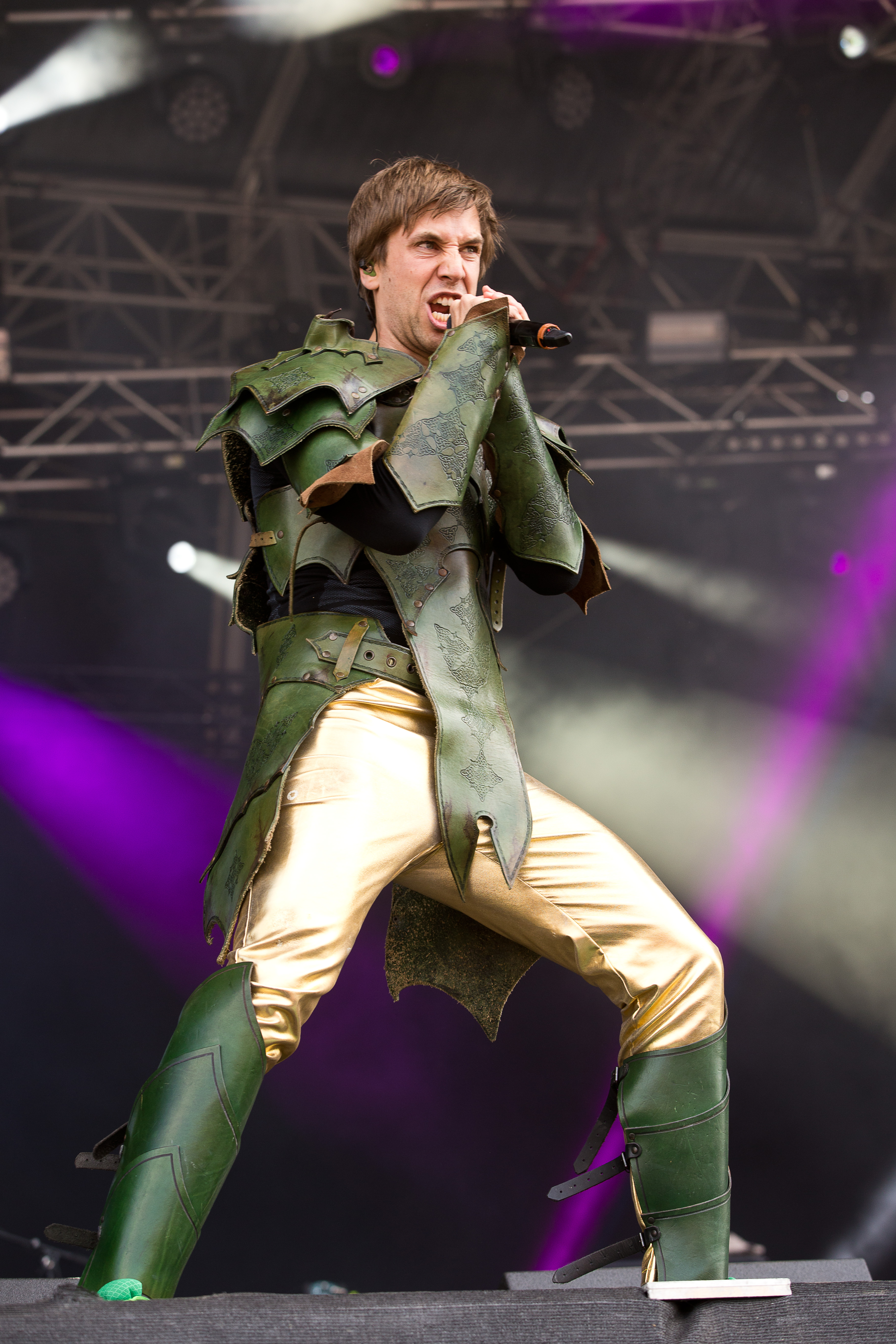
Winkler with Gloryhammer at Rockharz 2016 in Germany

Born in Zollikofen, Bern, Winkler started his music career in 2009 after finishing his studies at the University of Bern as Master of Law by joining Swiss heavy metal bands Emerald and T-Rage.

Winkler has also lent his voice to Chinese power metal band Barque of Dante for their single "Way of Your Life" in 2011 and stated he would contribute vocals for their second studio album "Lasting Forever".

In 2010, he uploaded a video to YouTube of himself auditioning for the British power metal band DragonForce. He was later discovered by Christopher Bowes, vocalist of the Scottish-based pirate metal band Alestorm, and was offered to join Gloryhammer. He initially declined but joined sometime later after several more offers. He was a member of the band from 2012 to 2021, and recorded three full-length albums with them.

On 22 August 2021, Gloryhammer announced that Thomas Winkler was no longer a member of the band. Thomas later addressed the situation, citing the band's reasons for his departure as disagreements on business and organizational matters.

=== Angus McSix ===
On 4 July 2022, Thomas announced that he would be returning to music-making, and he had signed with Napalm Records under his new act Angus McSix. On 10 October 2022, the full lineup for Angus McSix was announced, with Winkler being joined by Thalìa Bellazecca (formerly of Frozen Crown), Manu Lotter (formerly of Rhapsody of Fire) and Sebastian Levermann (of Orden Ogan) who represent characters in the story concept and appear in costumes. The band's first single, "Master of the Universe", was released on 19 January 2023, simultaneously with the announcement of their debut studio album, Angus McSix and the Sword of Power, which was released on 21 April 2023. Two more singles were released in support of the album, "Sixcalibur" and "Laser Shooting Dinosaur".

On 7 January 2025, Winkler announced his departure from Angus McSix, citing that he would be spending more time with family.

== Discography ==
=== Angus McSix ===
Studio albums

- Angus McSix and the Sword of Power (2023)

=== Emerald ===
Studio albums

- Re-Forged (2010)
- Unleashed (2012)

=== Gloryhammer ===
Studio albums

- Tales from the Kingdom of Fife (2013)
- Space 1992: Rise of the Chaos Wizards (2015)
- Legends from Beyond the Galactic Terrorvortex (2019)

=== Barque of Dante ===
Studio albums

- Lasting Forever (2013)
