= Tales from the Kingdom of Fife =

Studio album by Gloryhammer
- Released: 29 March 2013
- Recorded: June–December 2012
- Studio: LSD Studios, Lübeck, Germany
- Genre: Power metal
- Length: 48:08
- Label: Napalm
- Producer: Lasse Lammert

Gloryhammer chronology
Tales from the Kingdom of Fife (2013)	Space 1992: Rise of the Chaos Wizards (2015)

Tales from the Kingdom of Fife is the debut studio album by the British power metal band Gloryhammer. It was released on 29 March 2013 in Europe.

Professional ratings
Review scores
Source	Rating
metalunderground.com	5/5

== Story ==
In a fantasy version of 10th-century Scotland, as previously foretold ("Anstruther’s Dark Prophecy"), the evil wizard Zargothrax invades and conquers Dundee with an army of corrupted undead unicorns ("The Unicorn Invasion of Dundee"), kidnapping the princess Iona McDougall. The prince of the Kingdom of Fife, Angus McFife, swears revenge ("Angus McFife"); in a dream, he has a vision of three artifacts that will allow him to defeat Zargothrax, and sets off on a quest to acquire them.

McFife first battles north to obtain a magical war hammer ("Quest for the Hammer of Glory,") then travels to Strathclyde to acquire a golden dragon as his steed ("Magic Dragon"). Inspired by memories of McDougall, who is imprisoned by Zargothrax in a prison of ice ("Silent Tears of Frozen Princess,") McFife rides his dragon to Loch Rannoch and retrieves the Amulet of Justice from its depths ("Amulet of Justice"), completing his quest for the three artifacts.

Allying with the powerful Knights of Crail ("Hail to Crail"), McFife travels through Cowdenbeath ("Beneath Cowdenbeath") to confront Zargothrax in his stronghold. As the Knights battle the wizard's forces in the fields of Dunfermline, McFife and the Barbarian Warrior of Unst sneak into the castle through dwarven tunnels, aided by the hermit Ralathor ("The Epic Rage of Furious Thunder"). Meeting Zargothrax in single combat, McFife defeats the wizard and casts him into a frozen pool of "liquid ice." He then uses the Amulet of Justice to free the princess and the unicorns, restoring balance to the Kingdom of Fife.

== Track listing ==
All music and lyrics by Gloryhammer.

Standard Edition
No.	Title	Length
1.	"Anstruther's Dark Prophecy"	1:27
2.	"The Unicorn Invasion of Dundee"	4:26
3.	"Angus McFife"	3:28
4.	"Quest for the Hammer of Glory"	5:38
5.	"Magic Dragon"	5:28
6.	"Silent Tears of Frozen Princess"	5:34
7.	"Amulet of Justice"	4:27
8.	"Hail to Crail"	4:43
9.	"Beneath Cowdenbeath"	2:29
10.	"The Epic Rage of Furious Thunder"	10:28
Total length:		48:08

Heroic Edition
No.	Title	Length
11.	"Wizards!" (bonus track)	2:22
Total length:		50:30

== Personnel ==
Gloryhammer

- Angus McFife (Thomas Winkler) – vocals
- Ser Proletius (Paul Templing) – guitars, choir vocals
- Zargothrax (Christopher Bowes) – keyboards, choir vocals
- The Hootsman (James Cartwright) – bass, choir vocals
- Ralathor (Ben Turk) – drums, choir vocals, orchestral arrangements

Additional musicians

- Marie Lorey – female vocals
- Dominic Sewell Community Choir – voices
- Brendan Casey – choir vocals

Production

- Lasse Lammert – production, engineering, mixing, mastering, choir vocals
- Dan Goldsworthy – artwork, layout
- Steve Brown – photography
- Amy Turk – orchestral arrangements

== Charts ==
Chart (2013)	Peak position
Belgian Albums (Ultratop Wallonia)	151
