= Space opera =

Subgenre of science fiction and science fantasy

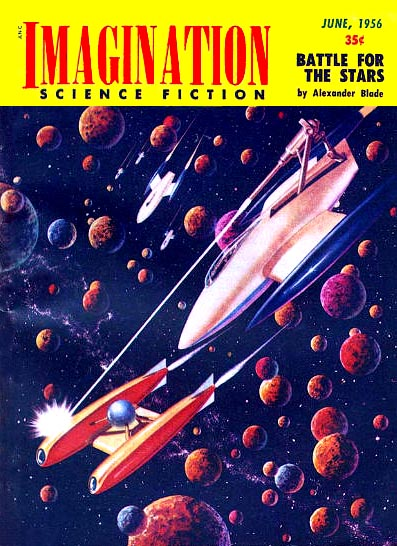
Cover of sci-fi magazine Imagination, June 1956

Space opera is a subgenre of science fiction and science fantasy that emphasizes epic outer space adventures set in a universe in which faster-than-light travel has become common. The plots often play out against a backdrop of space warfare, alien civilizations and galactic empires. The sub-genre is sometimes thought of as a futuristic homage to earlier adventure sagas, such as those found in mythology and chivalric romance.

The term does not refer to opera music, but instead originally referred to the melodrama, scope, and formulaic stories of operas, much as used in "soap opera", a melodramatic domestic drama, and "horse opera", a 1930s phrase for a clichéd and formulaic Western film. Prototypes of space opera emerged in the early twentieth century, and the genre today enjoys great popularity in literature, film, comics, television, video games and board games.

An early serial film which was based on space opera comic strips was Flash Gordon (1936), created by Alex Raymond. Perry Rhodan (1961–), a German franchise by multiple authors, is one of the most successful space opera book series. The Star Trek TV and film series (1966–) created by Gene Roddenberry, the Star Wars films (1977–) created by George Lucas, and the long-running British television series Doctor Who (1963–) have brought a great deal of attention to the sub-genre. A wave of "new space opera" works starting in the 1970s, in conjunction with the enormous success of the media franchises, helped space opera to become a critically acceptable sub-genre. From 1982 to 2002, the Hugo Award for Best Novel was often given to a space opera nominee.

== Definitions ==
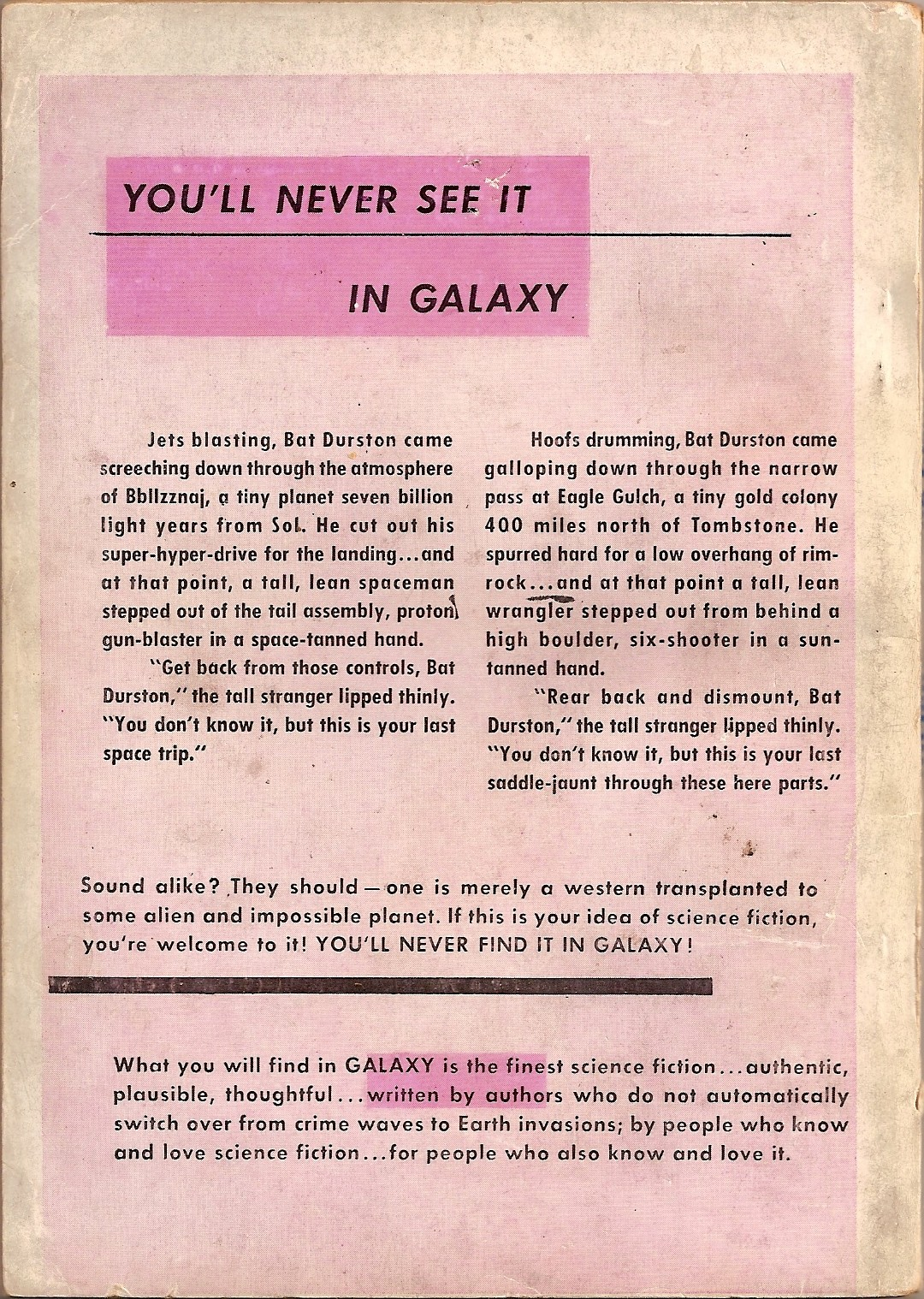
Back cover of the premier issue of Galaxy Magazine

Space opera has been defined as "a television or radio drama or motion picture that is a science-fiction adventure story". Some critics distinguish between space opera and planetary romance. Both feature adventures in exotic settings, but space opera emphasizes space travel, while planetary romances focus on alien worlds. In this view, the Martian, Venusian, and lunar-setting stories of Edgar Rice Burroughs would be planetary romances (and among the earliest), as would be Leigh Brackett's Burroughs-influenced Eric John Stark stories.

The term "space opera" was coined in 1941 by fan writer and author Wilson Tucker as a pejorative term in an article in Le Zombie (a science fiction fanzine). At the time, serial radio dramas in the United States had become popularly known as soap operas because many were sponsored by soap manufacturers. The term "horse opera" had also come into use to describe formulaic Western films. Tucker defined space opera as the science fiction equivalent: A "hacky, grinding, stinking, outworn, spaceship yarn". Fans and critics have noted that the plots of space operas have sometimes been taken from horse operas and simply translated into an outer space environment, as famously parodied on the back cover of the first issue of Galaxy Science Fiction. During the late 1920s and early 1930s, when the stories were printed in science-fiction magazines, they were often referred to as "super-science epics".

Beginning in the 1960s, and widely accepted by the 1970s, the space opera was redefined, following Brian Aldiss' definition in Space Opera (1974) as – paraphrased by Hartwell and Cramer – "the good old stuff". Yet soon after his redefinition, it began to be challenged, for example, by the editorial practice and marketing of Judy-Lynn del Rey and in the reviews of her husband and colleague Lester del Rey. In particular, they disputed the claims that space operas were obsolete, and Del Rey Books labeled reissues of earlier work of Leigh Brackett as space opera. By the early 1980s, space operas were again redefined, and the label was attached to major popular culture works such as Star Wars. Only in the early 1990s did the term space opera begin to be recognized as a legitimate genre of science fiction.

Hartwell and Cramer define space opera as:

... colorful, dramatic, large-scale science fiction adventure, competently and sometimes beautifully written, usually focused on a sympathetic, heroic central character and plot action, and usually set in the relatively distant future, and in space or on other worlds, characteristically optimistic in tone. It often deals with war, piracy, military virtues, and very large-scale action, large stakes.

Author A. K. DuBoff defines space opera as:

True space opera is epic in scale and personal with characters. It is about people taking on something bigger than themselves and their struggles to prevail. Though a setting beyond Earth is central, being on a spaceship or visiting another planet isn't the only qualifier. There must also be drama and sufficiently large scope to elevate a tale from being simply space-based to being real space opera.

Space opera can be contrasted in outline with "hard science fiction", in which the emphasis is on the effects of technological progress and inventions, and where the settings are carefully worked out to obey the laws of physics, cosmology, mathematics, and biology. Examples are seen in the works of Alastair Reynolds or the movie The Last Starfighter. At other times, space opera can concur with hard science fiction and differ from soft science fiction by instead focusing on scientific accuracy such as The Risen Empire by Scott Westerfeld. Other space opera works may be defined as a balance between both or simultaneously hard and soft science fiction such as the Dune prequel series by Kevin J. Anderson and Brian Herbert or the Star Wars series created by George Lucas.

== History ==
Early works which preceded the subgenre contained many elements of what would become space opera. They are today referred to as proto-space opera. Early proto-space opera was written by several 19th-century French authors, for example, Les Posthumes (1802) by Nicolas-Edme Rétif, Star ou Psi de Cassiopée: Histoire Merveilleuse de l'un des Mondes de l'Espace (1854) by C. I. Defontenay and Lumen (1872) by Camille Flammarion.

Not widely popular, proto-space operas were nevertheless occasionally written during the late Victorian and Edwardian science-fiction era. Examples may be found in the works of Percy Greg, Garrett P. Serviss, George Griffith, and Robert Cromie. Science fiction scholar E. F. Bleiler cites Robert William Cole's The Struggle for Empire: A Story of the Year 2236 as the first space opera in his 1990 reference work Science-Fiction: The Early Years. The novel depicts an interstellar conflict between solar men of Earth and a fierce humanoid race headquartered on Sirius. However, the idea for the novel arises out of a nationalistic genre of fiction popular from 1880 to 1914 called future-war fiction.

Despite this seemingly early beginning, it was not until the late 1920s that the space opera proper began to appear regularly in pulp magazines such as Amazing Stories. In film, the genre probably began with the 1918 Danish film, Himmelskibet. Unlike earlier stories of space adventure, which either related the invasion of Earth by extraterrestrials, or concentrated on the invention of a space vehicle by a genius inventor, pure space opera simply took space travel for granted (usually by setting the story in the far future), skipped the preliminaries, and launched straight into tales of derring-do among the stars. Early stories of this type include J. Schlossel's "Invaders from Outside" (Weird Tales, January 1925), The Second Swarm (Amazing Stories Quarterly, spring 1928) and The Star Stealers (Weird Tales, February 1929), Ray Cummings' Tarrano the Conqueror (1925), and Edmond Hamilton's Across Space (1926) and Crashing Suns (Weird Tales, August–September 1928). Similar stories by other writers followed through 1929 and 1930. By 1931, the space opera was well established as a major subgenre of science fiction.

However, the author cited most often as the true father of the genre is E. E. "Doc" Smith. His first published work, The Skylark of Space (Amazing Stories, August–October 1928), written in collaboration with Lee Hawkins Garby, is often called the first great space opera. It merges the traditional tale of a scientist inventing a space-drive with planetary romance in the style of Edgar Rice Burroughs. Smith's later Lensman series and the works of Edmond Hamilton, John W. Campbell, and Jack Williamson in the 1930s and 1940s were popular with readers and much imitated by other writers. By the early 1940s, the repetitiousness and extravagance of some of these stories led to objections from some fans and the return of the term in its original and pejorative sense.

Eventually, though, a fondness for the best examples of the genre led to a re-evaluation of the term and a resurrection of the subgenre's traditions. Writers such as Poul Anderson and Gordon R. Dickson had kept the large-scale space adventure form alive through the 1950s, followed by writers like M. John Harrison and C. J. Cherryh in the 1970s. By this time, "space opera" was for many readers no longer a term of insult but a simple description of a particular kind of science fiction adventure story.

In Japan, space opera themes became popular among tokusatsu films and shows in the 1950s. Notable examples include Warning from Space (1956), The Mysterians (1957), Super Giant (1957-1959), Planet Prince (1958-1959), Battle in Outer Space (1959) and Gorath (1962).

According to author Paul J. McAuley, a number of mostly British writers began to reinvent space opera in the 1970s (although most non-British critics tend to dispute the British claim to dominance in the new space opera arena). Significant events in this process include the publication of M. John Harrison's The Centauri Device in 1975 and a "call to arms" editorial by David Pringle and Colin Greenland in the Summer 1984 issue of Interzone; and the financial success of Star Wars, which follows some traditional space opera conventions. This "new space opera", which evolved around the same time cyberpunk emerged and was influenced by it, is darker, moves away from the "triumph of mankind" template of older space opera, involves newer technologies, and has stronger characterization than the space opera of old. While it does retain the interstellar scale and scope of traditional space opera, it can also be scientifically rigorous.

The new space opera was a reaction against the old. 'New space opera' proponents claim that the genre centers on character development, fine writing, high literary standards, verisimilitude, and a moral exploration of contemporary social issues. McAuley and Michael Levy identify Iain M. Banks, Stephen Baxter, M. John Harrison, Alastair Reynolds, McAuley himself, Ken MacLeod, Peter F. Hamilton, Ann Leckie, and Justina Robson as the most-notable practitioners of the new space opera. One of the most notable publishers Baen Books specialises in space opera and military science fiction, publishing many of the aforementioned authors, who have won Hugo Awards.

== Definitions by contrast ==
Several subsets of space opera overlap with military science fiction, concentrating on large-scale space battles with futuristic weapons in an interstellar war. Many series can be considered to belong and fall in two genres or even overlap all like Ender's Game series by Orson Scott Card or the Honorverse by David Weber. At one extreme, the genre is used to speculate about future wars involving space travel, or the effects of such a war on humans; at the other, it consists of the use of military fiction plots with some superficial science-fiction trappings in fictional planets with fictional civilizations and fictional extraterrestrials. The term "military space opera" is occasionally used to denote this subgenre, as used for example by critic Sylvia Kelso when describing Lois McMaster Bujold's Vorkosigan Saga. Other examples of military space opera include the Battlestar Galactica franchise and Robert A. Heinlein's 1959 novel Starship Troopers. The key distinction of military science fiction from space opera as part of the space warfare in science fiction is that the principal characters in a space opera are not military personnel, but civilians or paramilitary. That which brings them together under a common denominator is that military science fiction like space opera often concerns an interstellar war. Military science fiction however does not necessarily always include an outer space or multi-planetary setting like space opera and space Western.

Space Western also may emphasize space exploration as "the final frontier". These Western themes may be explicit, such as cowboys in outer space, or they can be a more subtle influence in space opera. Gene Roddenberry described Star Trek: The Original Series as a space Western (or more poetically, as "Wagon Train to the stars"). Firefly and its cinematic follow-up Serenity literalized the Western aspects of the genre popularized by Star Trek: it used frontier towns, horses, and the styling of classic John Ford Westerns. Worlds that have been terraformed may be depicted as presenting similar challenges as that of a frontier settlement in a classic Western. Six-shooters and horses may be replaced by ray guns and rockets.

== Parodies ==
Harry Harrison's novels Bill, the Galactic Hero and Star Smashers of the Galaxy Rangers, as well as the film adaptation of the former, the films Galaxy Quest and Mel Brooks' Spaceballs, and Family Guy's Laugh It Up, Fuzzball trilogy parody the conventions of classic space opera.

== See also ==
- List of space opera media
- Space opera in Scientology
