= Horse opera =

Formulaic Western movie or TV series

A horse opera, hoss opera, oat opera or oater is a Western film or television series that is clichéd or formulaic, in the manner of a (later) soap opera or space opera.

The term, which was originally coined by silent film-era Western star William S. Hart in 1916, is used variously to convey either disparagement or affection. The term "horse opera" is quite loosely defined; it does not specify a distinct sub-genre of the Western (as "space opera" does with regard to the science fiction genre). However, "horse operas" often incorporate aspects of both the soap opera and western genres. While used sparingly, in the 2010s the term "oat opera" has been used to describe films like Duel at Diablo, as well as series such as Yellowstone.

== See also ==
- Space opera
- Soap opera
- Spaghetti Western
- Category:American primetime television soap operas
