= Legends from Beyond the Galactic Terrorvortex =

2019 album by Gloryhammer

Studio album by Gloryhammer
- Released: 31 May 2019
- Genre: Power metal
- Length: 49:30
- Label: Napalm
- Producer: Lasse Lammert

Gloryhammer chronology
| Space 1992: Rise of the Chaos Wizards (2015) | Legends from Beyond the Galactic Terrorvortex (2019) | Return to the Kingdom of Fife (2023) |

Singles from Legends from Beyond the Galactic Terrorvortex
- 1. "Gloryhammer" Released: 12 April 2019; 2. "The Siege of Dunkeld (In Hoots We Trust)" Released: 10 May 2019

Legends from Beyond the Galactic Terrorvortex is the third studio album by the British power metal band Gloryhammer. It was released on 31 May 2019. It is the final album to feature vocalist Thomas Winkler.

== Story ==
After Earth was destroyed by the Hootsman in order to stop Zargothrax from summoning the Elder God Kor-Virliath, Zargothrax flees into the resulting wormhole ("Into the Terrorvortex of Kor-Virliath"). Angus McFife XIII follows him, and arrives in an alternate 992 A.D. Zargothrax arrived in the distant past, and, having conquered Dundee and the Kingdom of Fife, lays siege to Dunkeld ("The Siege of Dunkeld (In Hoots We Trust)"). Angus attempts to stop Zargothrax but quickly finds that the Hammer of Glory has no power in this dimension. While Angus flees, Zargothrax proclaims himself emperor and commands Ser Proletius, corrupted by the Knife of Evil, and his Death Knights of Crail, ordering them to slaughter more peasants in Auchtermuchty ("Masters of the Galaxy").

Angus McFife is told about a resistance far north in the valley of Achnasheen, the Land of the Unicorns. Upon reaching the resistance, he is met by Submarine Commander Ralathor, the hermit of Cowdenbeath ("The Land of Unicorns"). Ralathor tells Angus that he needs to charge his hammer by bringing it to the sun of this world; to do so, Angus must find the Legendary Enchanted Jetpack ("Power of the Laser Dragon Fire"). Angus quests away to acquire the jetpack ("Legendary Enchanted Jetpack"), and uses it to fly into outer space, where he recharges the Hammer ("Gloryhammer"). Returning to Fife, the resistance gathers aboard a flying submarine, the DSS Hootsforce ("Hootsforce"). They fly off to engage the forces of Zargothrax ("Battle for Eternity").

Zargothrax prepares a ritual tied to an imminent solar conjunction in order to ascend to godhood. While Ralathor destroys the Death Knights, Zargothrax mocks Angus and Ralathor, and declares his victory inevitable. Then, the Hootsman descends from the heavens; the Hootsman did not die in the destruction of Earth, but merged with the fabric of reality and became the god of this alternate universe. With the Hootsman's power and the Hammer of Glory, Angus and his allies kill Zargothrax.

As Zargothrax's corpse turns into liquid dust, Angus realizes that, during the fighting, he was stabbed with the Knife of Evil. Realizing that he would soon turn evil, Angus plunges into the volcano Mount Schiehallion. As Angus dies, a mysterious morse code transmission plays, reading "Activate Zargothrax Clone Alpha-1." ("The Fires of Ancient Cosmic Destiny").

== Track listing ==
| No. | Title | Length |
|---|---|---|
| 1. | "Into the Terrorvortex of Kor-Virliath" | 1:18 |
| 2. | "The Siege of Dunkeld (In Hoots We Trust)" | 4:46 |
| 3. | "Masters of the Galaxy" | 4:25 |
| 4. | "The Land of Unicorns" | 4:24 |
| 5. | "Power of the Laser Dragon Fire" | 5:06 |
| 6. | "Legendary Enchanted Jetpack" | 4:18 |
| 7. | "Gloryhammer" | 5:00 |
| 8. | "Hootsforce" | 3:50 |
| 9. | "Battle for Eternity" | 3:52 |
| 10. | "The Fires of Ancient Cosmic Destiny": I. "Dundaxian Overture"; II. "The Battle of Cowdenbeath"; III. "Return of the Astral Demigod of Unst"; IV. "The Knife of Evil"; V. "Transmission" | 12:33 |
| Total length: | | 49:32 |

Bonus 7" single
| No. | Title | Length |
|---|---|---|
| 1. | "Hootsforce" | 3:50 |
| 2. | "On the Wings of a Rainbow" | 4:00 |

Japanese bonus track
| No. | Title | Length |
|---|---|---|
| 11. | "On the Wings of a Rainbow" | 3:54 |

=== Notes ===
- The digipak edition of the album includes a second disc with the instrumental version of disc one.

== Personnel ==
Credits for Legends from Beyond the Galactic Terrorvortex adapted from liner notes.

Gloryhammer

- Thomas Winkler, "Angus Mcfife XIII, Crown Prince of Fife" – lead vocals
- Christopher Bowes, "Zargothrax, Dark Emperor of Dundee" – keyboards, additional vocals, lyrics
- Paul Templing, "Ser Proletius, Grand Master of the Deathknights of Crail" – guitars
- James Cartwright, "The Hootsman, Astral Demigod of Unst" – bass guitar, additional vocals
- Ben Turk, "Ralathor, Mysterious Submarine Commander of Cowdenbeath" – drums, programming

Additional musician

- Jens Johansson – keyboard solo (track 9)

Choir

- Amy Turk, Charlotte Jones, Chris Charles, David Stanton, Dominic Sewell, Katrina Riberio

Production

- Lasse Lammert – production, mixing, mastering
- Dan Goldsworthy – cover art, artwork, layout
- Robert Zembrzycki – photography
- Jessy Martens – vocal coach
- Travis Whalley – editing
- Matthew Bell – songwriting (track 5)
- Michael Barber - songwriting (track 10)

== Charts ==
| Chart (2019) | Peak position |
|---|---|
| Austrian Albums (Ö3 Austria) | 16 |
| Belgian Albums (Ultratop Flanders) | 75 |
| Belgian Albums (Ultratop Wallonia) | 169 |
| German Albums (Offizielle Top 100) | 6 |
| Scottish Albums (OCC) | 25 |
| Swiss Albums (Schweizer Hitparade) | 8 |
