= Samurai 8: The Tale of Hachimaru =

Japanese manga series created by Masahi Kishimoto

- First tankōbon volume cover, featuring Daruma (left), Hachimaru (center) and Hayataro (right)

サムライ8 八丸伝 (Samurai Eito Hachimaruden)
- Genre: Adventure; Samurai; Science fantasy
- Manga
- Written by: Masashi Kishimoto
- Illustrated by: Akira Ōkubo
- Published by: Shueisha
- English publisher: NA: Viz Media
- Imprint: Jump Comics
- Magazine: Weekly Shōnen Jump
- Original run: May 13, 2019 – March 23, 2020
- Volumes: 5
- icon

Samurai 8: The Tale of Hachimaru (Japanese: サムライ8 八丸伝, Hepburn: Samurai Eito Hachimaruden) is a Japanese manga written by Masashi Kishimoto and illustrated by Akira Okubo. It was serialized in Shueisha's Weekly Shōnen Jump from May 2019 to March 2020, with its chapters collected in five tankōbon volumes. In North America, Viz Media published the series on the Shonen Jump platform, and started the print release of the series in March 2020. Shueisha published it on the Manga Plus platform.

== Story ==
Hachimaru, a frail boy who cannot survive without life support, spends his days immersed in online games. His life changes when his robotic pet, Hayataro, brings home a Daruma doll. After Hachimaru draws eyes on it, the doll transforms into a feline-humanoid warrior named Daruma, who claims to be a samurai. Meanwhile, Hachimaru's father is searching for a Locker Ball—a star-shaped device capable of binding and splitting matter—to aid his son. However, during a deal, a rogue samurai betrays him and discovers that Hachimaru carries the soul of a legendary warrior. Forced into a trial by combat with the Locker Ball, Hachimaru undergoes a transformation, unlocking his hidden power as a samurai and ultimately defeating his enemy. However, his newfound abilities draw the attention of Ata, a mysterious enemy who launches a sudden assault. Though Hachimaru barely repels the attack at the cost of his father's life, he uncovers a hidden truth about his origins. Together with Daruma, he embarks on a quest to find Pandora's Box—an artifact once used by the Warrior God, Fudo Myo-o, to save the universe—and its seven keys to open it.

== Production ==
In an interview published in the October 2015 issue of Kadokawa's Entermix on August 20, Kishimoto discussed plans for his next work following the conclusion of his long-running series Naruto in November 2014. He revealed that his new project would be a science fiction manga and that he had already finalized the character designs. Kishimoto also indicated that, due to the physical strain of weekly serialization experienced during Naruto, his next work might not be published on a weekly schedule. In an August 2016 interview in Jump Giga, he stated that he had already planned the project and completed research for it. At Jump Festa '18 in December 2017, during a Boruto: Naruto Next Generations panel, Kishimoto displayed several layout sequences for his new work, which was planned to debut in 2018 for Weekly Shōnen Jump's 50th anniversary.

At Jump Festa 2019 in December 2018, Samurai 8: The Tale of Hachimaru was officially announced. The new series, a collaboration between Kishimoto and his former assistant Akira Okubo, was scheduled to debut in Weekly Shōnen Jump in the second quarter of 2019. During the event, Naruto's voice actress Junko Takeuchi read a statement from Kishimoto explaining that the manga would blend his appreciation for Japanese culture and aesthetics with science fiction settings and technology. At a March 2019 press conference held at Shueisha, Kishimoto stated he expected Samurai 8 to run for at least ten volumes, noting, "I remember saying one time that Naruto would be 15 volumes. It always ends up being longer." Despite this expectation, the series concluded on March 23, 2020, after 43 chapters.

== Publication ==
Samurai 8: The Tale of Hachimaru was created, written, and storyboarded by Masashi Kishimoto, and illustrated by Akira Okubo, who had been an assistant of Kishimoto's on Naruto from the early 2000s till the series' end. A four-page preview of the manga was released in Weekly Shōnen Jump's combined issue #22–23 on April 27, 2019, being the final issue published in the Heisei period. Samurai 8: The Tale of Hachimaru began serialization in Weekly Shōnen Jump's 24th issue on May 13, 2019, being the first series in the magazine published in the Japanese Reiwa period. The series finished on March 23, 2020. The first two tankōbon volumes were published on October 4, 2019, while the fifth and final volume was published on May 13, 2020. (Note: Volume 5 was set to be published on May 1, 2020, but was delayed to May 13 due to COVID-19 concerns.)

In North America, Viz Media published the preview chapter and published the chapters simultaneously with the releases in Japan on the Shonen Jump platform, while Shueisha published it on the Manga Plus platform. In October 2019, Viz Media announced that the series would be released in early 2020.

=== Volumes ===
| No. | Title | Original release date | English release date |
|---|---|---|---|
| 1 | The First Key; Hito-tsume no Kagi (1つめの鍵) | October 4, 2019; 978-4-08-882022-4 | March 3, 2020; 978-1-9747-1502-2 |
1. "The First Key" (1つめの鍵, Hito-tsume no Kagi); 2. "Visitor from the Sky" (空からの訪問者, Sora kara no Hōmon-sha); 3. "Cutting the Tank" (戦車入刀, Sensha Nyūtō); 4. "Family Argument" (親子ゲンカ, Oyako Genka); 5. "Departure" (出発, Shuppatsu); 6. "Samurai of Fate" (運命の侍様, Unmei no Samurai-sama)
| 2 | For Whom and For What; Dare no Tame ni, Nan no Tame ni (誰のために、何のために) | October 4, 2019; 978-4-08-882082-8 | May 5, 2020; 978-1-9747-1538-1 |
7. "Encounter" (出会い, Deai); 8. "Take It Slowly" (ゆっくりでよい, Yukkuri Deyoi); 9. "Together..." (ふたりで..., Futari de...); 10. "Target Acquired" (ターゲット捕捉, Tāgetto Hosoku); 11. "How Dare You" (ふざけたマネを, Fuzaketa Mane o); 12. "For Whom and For What" (誰のために、何のために, Dare no Tame ni, Nan no Tame ni); 13. "I Saw a Hero" (勇を見た, Yū o Mita); 14. "Father's Secret" (父の秘密, Chichi no Himitsu); 15. "Hachimaru's Calling" (八丸の「義」, Hachimaru no "Gi")
| 3 | Kotsuga & Ryu; Kotsuga to Ryū (コツガとリュウ) | January 4, 2020; 978-4-08-882175-7 | August 4, 2020; 978-1-9747-1808-5 |
16. "Star-Breaker" (星砕き, Hoshi Kudaki); 17. "Kotsuga & Ryu" (コツガとリュウ, Kotsuga to Ryū); 18. "Always Shop Responsibly" (ご利用は計画的に, Go Riyō wa Keikaku-teki ni); 19. "Whatever It Takes!!!" (何が何でも!!!, Nani ga Nandemo!!!); 20. "Partner" (相棒, Aibō); 21. "Shining White Blade" (白く輝く牙, Shiroku Kagayaku Yaiba); 22. "Ann and Her Brother" (アンと兄, An to Ani); 23. "What Good Will That Do You?!" (それが何の役に立つ!, Sore ga Nan no Yaku ni Tatsu!); 24. "Hachimaru vs. Ryu, Rematch!!" (八丸VS竜、再戦!!, Hachimaru bāsasu Ryū, Saisen!!)
| 4 | Partner; Aibō (相棒) | March 4, 2020; 978-4-08-882227-3 | November 3, 2020; 978-1-9747-1815-3 |
25. "Encounter" (遭遇, Sōgū); 26. "Like a Samurai" (侍らしく, Samurai-rashiku); 27. "Awakening" (目覚め, Mezame); 28. "Daruma the Initiate" (免許皆伝 達麻, Menkyokaiden Daruma); 29. "Yoshitsune's Calling" (義常の義, Yoshitsune no Gi); 30. "Infiltration" (潜入, Sen'nyū); 31. "This Wasn't the Deal!" (話が違う!!, Hanashi ga Chigau!!); 32. "Time Limit" (タイムリミット, Taimu Rimitto); 33. "Partner" (相棒, Aibō)
| 5 | The Next Shooting Star; Tsugi no Nagareboshi (次の流れ星) | May 13, 2020; 978-4-08-882281-5 | February 2, 2021; 978-1-9747-2102-3 |
34. "License Download" (免許ダウンロード, Menkyo Daunrōdo); 35. "Wabi-Sabi" (侘び寂び); 36. "Hanaichi and Goku" (花一と五空, Hanaichi to Gokū); 37. "Rivals" (好敵手(ライバル), Raibaru); 38. "Ann and Hachimaru and Goku" (アンと八丸と五空, An to Hachimaru to Gokū); 39. "Sneak Attack" (奇襲, Kishū); 40. "Loss of Support" (支えの喪失, Sasae no Sōshitsu); 41. "Nanashi the Samurai" (侍・七志, Samurai Nanashi); 42. "The Next Shooting Star" (次の流れ星, Tsugi no Nagareboshi); 43. "Pandora's Box" (パンドラの箱, Pandora no Hako)

== Reception ==
Rebecca Silverman of Anime News Network ranked the first volume as a B−. Silverman considered that the series appeals to younger readers although the good-hearted nature of the series could appeal to older readers as well. She praised Okubo's art but considered the world's lore largely underdeveloped and felt that there are too noticeable gaps in the story's continuity. Karen Maeda of Sequential Tart gave the first volume an 8 out of 10. Maeda said that the manga has many elements which make it interesting and concluded: "The creator of Naruto plays a lot in the fantasy landscape. I think this is going to be a pretty fun ride! I highly recommend picking this one up if you want something fun that is pure manga, and if you like dogs that meow."
