= List of programs broadcast by SF =

This is a list of television programs and movies that were formerly broadcast by the Australian pay television channel SF, which closed 31 December 2013 and was replaced by Syfy. Programs that are listed in bold are currently, or have previously, aired on Syfy.

== Final programming ==
=== Original programming ===
- Go Pop

=== International programming ===
- The 4400
- The Almighty Johnsons
- Alphas
- The Andromeda Strain
- **Angel**
- Battlestar Galactica
- **Buffy the Vampire Slayer**
- Caprica
- **Charmed**
- **Continuum**
- The Dead Zone
- **Defiance**
- **Doctor Who**
- Early Edition
- **Eureka**
- **Face Off**
- Farscape
- Forever Knight
- **Ghost Hunters International**
- Harper's Island
- **Hollywood Treasure**
- Jericho
- Kapow!
- Kingdom Hospital
- Knight Rider
- Lost Girl
- Medium
- Odyssey 5
- Paranormal Witness
- Quantum Leap
- Ripley's Believe It or Not!
- **Sanctuary**
- Sliders
- Stargate Atlantis
- **Stargate SG-1**
- Stargate Universe
- Star Trek: Deep Space Nine
- Star Trek: Enterprise
- **Star Trek: The Next Generation**
- Star Trek: The Original Series
- **Star Trek: Voyager**
- Surface
- Thunderbirds
- Todd and the Book of Pure Evil
- **Warehouse 13**
- Xena: Warrior Princess
- The X-Files

==== Documentaries ====
- Captains of the Final Frontier
- Conspiracy Theory: Did We Land On The Moon
- Ghosts Caught on Tape: Fact or Fiction
- World's Greatest Hoaxes: Secrets Finally Revealed

==== Animation ====
- Astro Boy
- My Hero Academia
- Spider-Man
- X-Men

==== Movies ====
- The 6th Day
- Anaconda
- Anacondas: The Hunt for the Blood Orchid
- Bram Stoker's Dracula
- Carrie
- Christine
- Close Encounters of the Third Kind
- The Covenant
- **Dawn of the Dead**
- Evolution
- The Exorcism of Emily Rose
- Fortress 2: Re-Entry
- Frankenfish
- From Stargate to Atlantis
- Gattaca
- Ghost Rider
- Ghostbusters
- Ghostbusters II
- Godzilla
- Hellboy
- Jumanji
- Lara Croft Tomb Raider: The Cradle of Life
- Last Action Hero
- Men in Black
- Poltergeist
- Real Fear
- Resident Evil: Apocalypse
- Resident Evil: Extinction
- RoboCop
- RoboCop 2
- Screamers
- Serenity
- Species
- Spider-Man
- Star Trek: Nemesis
- Stargate
- Stargate: The Ark of Truth
- Stargate: Beyond the Mythology of Stargate SG-1
- Stargate: Continuum
- Starship Troopers 2: Hero of the Federation
- Stealth
- The Terminator
- Terminator 2: Judgment Day
- UFOs: Best Evidence
- Underworld: Evolution
- Urban Legend
- Zoom

== Past programming ==
=== International programming ===
- Afterworld
- Babylon 5
- Battlestar Galactica
- Bionic Woman
- Captain Scarlet and the Mysterons
- Cleopatra 2525
- Earth 2
- Earth: Final Conflict
- Firefly
- Galactica 1980
- Heroes
- Jake 2.0
- Kingdom Hospital
- Lexx
- Missing
- Mysterious Ways
- The Outer Limits
- Sea of Souls
- seaQuest DSV (later retitled seaQuest 2032)
- The Sentinel
- Threshold
- V
- Who Wants to Be a Superhero?
- Wolf Lake

==== Animation ====
- Black Lagoon
- Blade
- Blood+
- Cowboy Bebop
- Ghost in the Shell: Stand Alone Complex
- Iron Man
- Men in Black: The Series
- The Real Ghostbusters
- Samurai X
- Wolverine

==== Movies ====
- 30 Days of Night
- Bicentennial Man
- Bill & Ted's Bogus Journey
- The Butterfly Effect
- The Cave
- Cowboy Bebop: The Movie
- Dragon Wars: D-War
- The Fog
- The Forgotten
- Hunter Prey
- Invasion of the Body Snatchers
- Lara Croft: Tomb Raider
- Mars Attacks!
- The Medallion
- Men in Black II
- Pitch Black
- Prom Night
- Running Against Time
- Skinwalkers
- Terminator 3: Rise of the Machines
- Terwar
- Thoughtcrimes
- Under the Mountain
- Vampire Bats
- Warbirds
- Wind Chill

== Unaired original programming ==
- Arrowhead (currently in production; to be aired in 2014 on another network due to SF's closure)
