= The Struggle for Empire: A Story of the Year 2236 =

1900 novelette by Robert William Cole

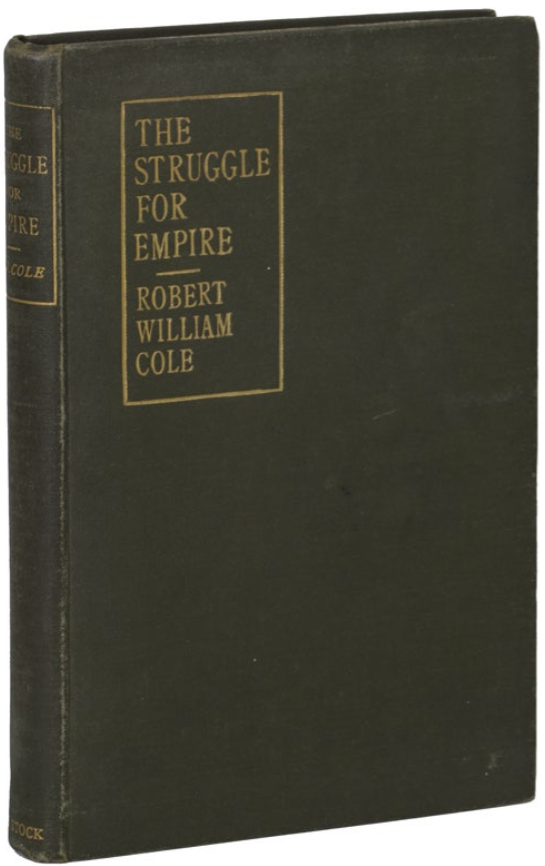
- Author: Robert William Cole
- Language: English
- Genre: Novelette
- Publisher: Elliot Stock, 62, Paternoster Row, E.C.
- Publication date: 1900
- Publication place: UK
- Text: The Struggle for Empire: A Story of the Year 2236 at Wikisource

The Struggle for Empire: A Story of the Year 2236 written by Robert William Cole and first published in 1900 is a science fiction novel. It is regarded as one of the first space operas.

== Significance ==
It is often credited with being the first novel to introduce the concept of galactic empires, interstellar travel and fleets of starships in the thousands locked in combat.

== Plot ==
The British Empire has colonized the nations of Africa, Asia and others on Earth, and in which the 'Anglo-Saxon race' had 'long ago absorbed the whole globe'.

The expanding Anglo-Saxon Empire of Earth then clashes with a similar empire based on Kairet, a planet in the Sirius system. Both sides have forgotten spiritual and philosophical values, and are driven by greed. Commercial rivalries escalate into an interstellar war which results in the destruction of most of the Terran fleet and the invasion of Earth.

== Future technology ==
The novel's technology includes antigravity, interplanetary radio, television, various forms of death ray and industrial transmutation.
