= List of Hungarian television series =

This article contains the most popular Hungarian commercial television channels and other stations.

== TV2 ==
Title	Category	Viewers	Year/Status
10!	celebrity magazine		2008-2009
Az igazság ára (The Price of Truth)	quiz^{(The Moment of Truth - Hungarian version)}		2008-2008
A kiválasztott - Ki lesz Uri Geller utódja? (The Chosen One - Who Will Be Uri Geller's Successor?)	reality show^{(Successor - Hungarian version)}		2008-2008
A nagy fogyás (The Big Weight Lose)	reality show^{(The Biggest Loser - Hungarian version)}		2007-2008
A Nagy Ő (Season 1) (The Bachelor)	reality show^{(The Bachelor - Hungarian version)}		2003-2003
A Nagy Ő (Season 2) (The Bachelor)	reality show^{(The Bachelor - Hungarian version)}		2004-2004
A Nagy (n)Ő (Season 3) (The Bachelorette)	reality show^{(The Bachelorette - Hungarian version)}		2004-2004
A sztárok a fejükre estek (The Stars Fell On Their Head)	celebrity travel reality series	1,4 million (average)	2008-2008
Activity	television activity		2000-2007
Activity - A milliós küldetés (Activity - The Millionaire Challenge)	television activity		2007-2008
Aktív (Active)	magazine		2001–present
Alexandra Pódium	cultural magazine		2006–present
Áll az alku	quiz^{(Deal or No Deal - Hungarian version)}		2005-2007; 2009–present
All You Need Is Love - Ha Te is akarod (All You Need Is Love - If You Want It As Well)	reality show^{(All You Need Is Love - Hungarian version)}		2003-2003
Az Ügy (The Case)	charity document series		2006–present
Babavilág (Babyworld)	baby magazine		2006-2009
Banánhéj	comedy show		2003-2007
Bázis (Base)	military reality show		2001-2001
Bennfentes (Insider)	star magazine		2003-2003
Betűbár (WordBar)	quiz		2005-2007
Big Brother (Season 1)	reality show^{(Big Brother - Hungarian version)}	1,9 million (high)	2002-2002
Big Brother (Season 2)	reality show^{(Big Brother - Hungarian version)}	500,000 (low)	2003-2003
Big Brother VIP (Season 1)	reality show^{(Big Brother VIP - Hungarian version)}		2003-2003
Big Brother VIP (Season 2)	reality show^{(Big Brother VIP - Hungarian version)}		2003-2003
Big Brother VIP (Season 3)	reality show^{(Big Brother VIP - Hungarian version)}		2003-2003
Buzera (Irritating)	show		2005-2005
Cápák (Sharks)	quiz		2008-2008
Claudia	talk show		2002-2003
Csaó, Darwin! (Ciao, Darwin!)	emulator^{(Hungarian version)}		2004-2006
Dalnokok ligája	talent competition with celebrity contestants		2003-2003
Dolce Vita	man magazine		2006-2006
Egy a Száz ellen (One versus Hundred)	quiz^{(One versus Hundred - Hungarian adaptation)}		2007-2007
Egy rém rendes család Budapesten	comedy^{(Married With Children - Hungarian adaptation)}		2006-2006
Észbontó	quiz		2005-2007
Favorite (Favourite)	celebrity magazine		2007-2008
Fort Boyard - Az erőd	reality show^{(Fort Boyard - Hungarian version)}		2000-2000
Frei Dosszié (Frei Dossier)	document series		2000-2008
Good Bike	motorbike magazine		2007-2007
Gyerekszáj (Childmouth)	talk show		2000-2001
Hal a tortán (Season 1) (Fish on The Cake)	gastro-reality show		2008-2008
Hal a tortán (Season 2) (Fish on The Cake)	gastro-reality show		2008-2009
Hal a tortán (Season 3) (Fish on The Cake)	gastro-reality show		2009-2010
Hárman párban (Season 1; Summer Edition)	dating show^{(Hungarian version)}		2003-2003
Hárman párban (Season 2; Autumn Edition)	dating show^{(Hungarian version)}		2003-2003
Irigy Hónaljmirigy Show (Jealous Armpitgland Show)	comedy show		2001–present
Játékidő (Gametime)	quiz		ENDED
Jóban Rosszban (Through Foul and Fair)	soap		2005–present
Joshi Bharat	talk show		2008–present
Kalandjárat (Adventure Line)	document series		ENDED
Kapcsoltam	quiz		2001-2003
Katalin bírónő (Judge Katalin)	judiciary show		2003-2003
Két TestŐr (Two BodyGuards)	lifestyle magazine		on weekends
Kurázsi	magazine of European Union		2007-2007
Kvízió	quiz		2008-2009
Laktérítő	interior show		ENDED
LazaC	morning show		ENDED
Liptai Claudia Show	show		on Wednesdays
Lucifer	show		ENDED
Magánszám	comedy show		2003-2003
Magellán	scientific magazine		2003-2008
Médiacápa (MediaShark)	comedy show	popular	2007-2008
Megasztár (Season 1) (Megastar)	talent competition^{(Pop Idol - unlincensed Hungarian adaptation)}	very popular	2003-2004
Megasztár (Season 2) (Megastar)	talent competition^{(Pop Idol - unlicensed Hungarian adaptation)}	very popular	2004-2005
Megasztár - Határok nélkül (Season 3) (Megastar - Without Boundaries)	talent competition^{(Pop Idol - unlicensed Hungarian adaptation)}	very popular	2005-2006
Megasztár (Season 4) (Megastar)	reality show/song contest^{(Star Academy - Hungarian adaptation)}	popular	2008-2008
Megasztár (Season 5) (Megastar)	talent competition^{(Pop Idol - unlicensed Hungarian adaptation)}		Scheduled for Fall 2010
Megatánc (Megadance)	reality show/dance contest^{(So You Think You Can Dance - unlicensed Hungarian adaptation)}		2006-2006
Micuko	comedy show/candied camera		2003-2003
Mi kérünk elnézést! (We Apologize)	political comedy show		2006-2008
Mokka (Mocha)	morning show		on weekdays
Mr & Mrs	celebrity game show		2009-2009
Multimilliomos (Multimillionaire)	quiz		ENDED
Napló (Diary)	news show		1999–present
Nyom nélkül (Without A Trace)	crime document series		ENDED
Okosabb vagy, mint egy ötödikes? (Are You Smarter Than A Fifth Grader?)	quiz^{(Are You Smarter Than A Fifth Grader? - Hungarian version)}		2007-2007
Pokerstars.hu	celebrity poker competition		2009–present
Popdaráló (Season 1)	talent competition^{(Singing Bee - Hungarian version)}		2008-2008
Popdaráló (Season 2)	talent competition^{(Singing Bee - Hungarian version)}		2008-2008
Propaganda (Gimmick)	cultural magazine		ENDED
Senorita Szöszi (Senorita Blondie)	reality series		2008-2008
Stahl konyhája (Stahl's Kitchen)	gastronomic show		everyday
Strucc (Ostrich)	magazine		ENDED
Szóda	quiz		2006-2007
Sztárok a jégen (Stars on the Ice)	reality show^{(Stars on the Ice - unlicensed Hungarian adaptation)}		2007-2007
Sztárral szemben (Opposite a Star)	reality show^{(Schlaag den Raab - unlicensed Hungarian adaptation)}		2009-2009
Szulák Andrea Show (Andrea Szulák Show)	show		2003-2007
Szülőszoba (Labour Room)	obstetric reality show		2005-2006
Tégla (The Mole)	reality show^{(The Mole - Hungarian adaptation)}		2001-2001
Tények (Facts)	news		1998–present
Tények Este (Facts Night)	news		1999–present
Tények Reggel (Facts Morning)	news		1999–present
Total Car	car magazine		2002-2006
TV2 Matiné	weekend collection of animations/cartoons		1998–present
TV2 Ring	box		2003-2006
Világ árvái (Orphans of the World)	document series		2006-2006
Vitriol	actual show based on news		ENDED

== RTL Klub ==
Title	Category	Popularity	Status
06-91-334-455	quiz		on weekdays and Saturdays
XXI. század (Twenty-first Century)	historical magazine		on Tuesdays
A széf (The Safe)	quiz^{(Take it or Live it - Hungarian adaptation)}		2007–present
A rettegés foka (Season 1) (Fear Factor)	reality show^{(Fear Factor - Hungarian adaptation)}		2005-2005
A rettegés foka (Season 2) (Fear Factor)	reality show^{(Fear Factor - Hungarian adaptation)}		2006-2006
Antenna	euroatlantic magazine		ENDED
Autómánia (Carmania)	car magazine		on weekends
Bajkeverők (Mischiefs)	road show		2005-2005
Balázs	talkshow		2003-2008
Barátok közt	soap	the most popular show in Hungary	1998-2021
Benne leszek a tévében! (I Will Be On TV!)	talent competition		2005-2005
Benkő feleséget keres (Benkő Searching For A Wife)	reality show	2,0 million	2009-2009
Cadillac Drive	road show		2006-2006
Celeb vagyok, ments ki innen! (Season 1) (I'm A Celebrity, Get Me Out Of Here!)	reality show^{(I'm A Celebrity, Get Me Out Of Here! - Hungarian adaptation)}		2008-2008
Celeb vagyok, ments ki innen! (Season 2) (I'm A Celebrity, Get Me Out Of Here!)	reality show^{(I'm A Celebrity, Get Me Out Of Here! - Hungarian adaptation)}		2008-2008
Celeb vagyok, ments ki innen! (Season 3) (I'm A Celebrity, Get Me Out Of Here!)	reality show^{(I'm A Celebrity, Get Me Out Of Here! - Hungarian adaptation)}		PLANNED
Csillag születik (Season 1) (A Star Will Be Born)	talent competition	very popular	2007-2007
Csillag születik (Season 2) (A Star Will Be Born)	talent competition		2009-2009
Delelő	noon show		ENDED
Esti Showder Fábry Sándorral (Night Show with Sándor Fábry)	show^{(The Tonight Show with Jay Leno - unlicensed Hungarian adaptation)}		(1998-2011) Thursdays fortnightly
Fókusz (Focus)	magazine		on weekdays
Fókusz Plusz (Focus Plus)	magazine		on Saturdays
Fókusz Portré (Focus Portrait)	report magazine		
Gálvölgyi Show	comedy show		once a month
Győzike	family reality show		2005-2009
Havazin	winter show		ENDED
Házon kívül	political magazin		on Thursdays
Heti Hetes (Weekly Seven)	actual show based on news/comedy		1999–present
Hírek (News)	news		1997–present daily
Kalandra fal!	game show^{(Hole In The Wall - Hungarian adaptation)}		2009-2009
Kész Átverés (Ready Ramp)	ramps		2001–present
Koóstoló	night show		1998-1999
Kölyök Klub (Kid Club)	kid show		1998–present
Legyen Ön is Milliomos! (Be A Millionaire, too!)	quiz^{(Who Wants To Be A Millionaire? - Hungarian adaptation)}		2000-2006 2008-2008
Mónika	talkshow		on weekdays
Ötletház (House of Idea)	interior show		ENDED
Péntek Esti Vigadó	show		1999-2000
Pókerarc	quiz		2007-2007
Recept Klub (Recipe Club)	gastronomic show		1998–present daily
Reflektor	star magazine (former Találkozások)		2006–present on weekdays
Reggeli (Breakfast)	morning show		on weekdays
RTL Boksz Klub (RTL Box Club)	box		?
Showder Club	stand-up comedy^{(Esti Showder Fábry Sándorral spin-off)}		2009–present
Survivor - A sziget (Season 1) (Survivor - The Island)	reality show^{(Survivor - Hungarian adaptation)}		2003-2003
Survivor - A sziget (Season 2) (Survivor - The Island)	reality show^{(Survivor - Hungarian adaptation)}		2004-2004
Szeress most! (Love Me Now!)	soap		ENDED
Szeszélyes (Capricious)	comedy show		ENDED
Szombat esti láz (Season 1) (Saturday Night Fever)	dance competition with celebrities^{(Dancing with the Stars - Hungarian adaptation)}		2006-2006
Szombat esti láz (Season 2) (Saturday Night Fever)	dance competition with celebrities^{(Dancing with the Stars - Hungarian adaptation)}		2006-2006
Szombat esti láz (Season 3) (Saturday Night Fever)	dance competition with celebrities^{(Dancing with the Stars - Hungarian adaptation)}		2008-2008
Sztárbox (Starbox)	box show		2004-2004; 2005-2005
Tébolygó	game show^{(Crazy Planet - Hungarian adaptation)}		1999-1999
ValóVilág (Season 1) (Real World)	reality show	popular	2002-2002
ValóVilág (Season 2) (Real World)	reality show	very popular	2003-2003
ValóVilág (Season 3) (Real World)	reality show	very popular	2004-2004
ValóVilág (Season 4) (Real World)	reality show		Scheduled for Fall 2010
X-Faktor (X-Factor)	talent competition^{(X-Factor - Hungarian adaptation)}		Scheduled for Fall 2010

== Viasat 3 ==
Title	Category	Popularity	Status
A Farm (The Farm)	reality show^{(The Farm - Hungarian adaptation)}		2002-2002
Bár (Season 1) (Bar)	reality show^{(The Bar - Hungarian adaptation)}		2001-2001
Bár 2.0 (Season 2) (Bar)	reality show^{(The Bar - Hungarian adaptation)}		2008-2008
Hot Sztárkvíz (Celebrity Quiz of Hot Magazine)	quiz		ENDED
Lúzer FC (Loser FC)	reality show^{(Hungarian adaptation)}		2006-2006
Sofőrök (Drivers)	reality show		2007-2008
Start Autó	car magazine		on Saturdays
Topmodell (Top Model)	reality show^{(America's Next Top Model - Hungarian adaptation)}		2006-2006
Tutifuvar - A taxiquiz	quiz		2006-2006
Vidióták (Vidiots)	funniest Hungarian homevideos		ENDED

== Cool TV ==
Title	Category	Popularity	Status
Aktmodell (Nude Model)	reality show		2007
Cool a verda (Cool Da Ride)	reality show _{Pimp My Ride - unlicensed Hungarian adaptation}		ENDED
Cool Hits	music magazine		2006–present
Cool Live	live chat and guests with the hosts	popular	2006–present
Cool Party	live chat and guests with the hosts		2006-2008
Cool Star	live chat and guests with the hosts		2006-2008
Cool Top20	live chat and guests with the hosts	popular	2006–present
Cool Trend	live chat and guests with the hosts	popular	2006–present
Cool Weekend	live chat and guests with the hosts		2006-2008
Cumi - Ki nyel ma? (Dummy - Who Sucks Today?)	reality show with hosts		2008-2009
Laptop DJ	music and club magazine		2006-2007
Vad csajok (Wild Girls)	erotic reality series		2006-2007

== See also ==
- Media of Hungary
