= Space 1992: Rise of the Chaos Wizards =

Studio album by Gloryhammer
- Released: September 25, 2015
- Recorded: April–May 2015
- Studio: LSD Studios, Lübeck, Germany
- Genre: Power metal
- Length: 52:42
- Label: Napalm
- Producer: Lasse Lammert

Gloryhammer chronology
Tales from the Kingdom of Fife (2013)	Space 1992: Rise of the Chaos Wizards (2015)	Legends from Beyond the Galactic Terrorvortex (2019)

Singles from Space 1992: Rise of the Chaos Wizards
- 1. "Universe on Fire" Released: 8 August 2015; 2. "Rise of the Chaos Wizards" Released: 11 September 2015

Space 1992: Rise of the Chaos Wizards is the second studio album by the British power metal band Gloryhammer. It was released on September 25, 2015. The deluxe edition contains an additional disc of orchestral renditions of the full album, with alternate titles. It reached number 18 in the UK Rock & Metal Charts.

== Story ==
In "the distant future of the year 1992", a millennium after the events of Tales from the Kingdom of Fife, the evil wizard Zargothrax remains in cryogenic sleep, imprisoned on Triton and guarded by the Space Knights of Crail ("Infernus Ad Astra"). A cult of "unholy chaos wizards" plot his release and attack Triton, defeating the Knights and freeing Zargothrax, who promises to terrorize the galaxy ("Rise of the Chaos Wizards"). The intergalactic warrior prince Angus McFife XIII, descendant of the original Angus McFife, sets out to thwart him once again, wielding the powerful Hammer of Glory, passed down through generations from the original Angus McFife, renamed through its 1000 years to the legendary Astral Hammer ("Legend of the Astral Hammer").

Zargothrax seeks out the Goblin King, who gives him the crystal key to a secret portal to Hell that lies on Earth beneath Dundee ("Goblin King of the Darkstorm Galaxy"). Meanwhile, McFife is joined by the legendary Hollywood Hootsman ("The Hollywood Hootsman"), the reformed Knights of Crail led by Ser Proletius and Triton survivor Ser Regulon ("Victorious Eagle Warfare"), and the Questlords of Inverness ("Questlords of Inverness, Ride to the Galactic Fortress!"). Both the allied forces ("Heroes [of Dundee]") and Zargothrax's demonic army ("Universe on Fire") prepare for battle in the skies above Mars.

As the opposing forces clash, with heavy casualties for McFife's allies, Zargothrax returns to Earth where, in the caverns beneath Dundee, he begins a ritual to unleash the hellish Elder God Kor-Virliath upon the galaxy. Warned of the danger by the hermit Ralathor, the Hootsman speeds back to Earth and detonates his body's neutron star heart, vaporizing the planet and stopping the ritual just in time ("Apocalypse 1992"). Foiled, the furious Zargothrax escapes into another reality through the ensuing chaotic space-time rift, pursued closely by Angus McFife XIII.

== Critical reception ==
Professional ratings
Review scores
Source	Rating
Metal Hammer (Germany)	5/7
Revolver	4/5
Rock Hard	7.5/10

Professional reviewers agreed that the album's style and story should not be taken too seriously but lauded the musical quality of the band. The writer for Rock Hard stated even that it was one of the best Epic power metal releases since Rhapsody's 1997 debut album. While Revolver's reviewer wrote that the "ultra-happy key changes in the choruses of 'Legend of the Astral Hammer' and 'Victorious Eagle Warfare' would put Bon Jovi’s 'Livin’ on a Prayer" to shame', the German edition of Metal Hammer argued that the band was pursuing a risky concept with its overly high-pitched voices.

== Track listing ==
No.	Title	Lyrics	Music	Length
1.	"Infernus Ad Astra"	Christopher Bowes	Ben Turk	1:24
2.	"Rise of the Chaos Wizards"	Bowes	Bowes, Turk, Paul Templing	3:57
3.	"Legend of the Astral Hammer"	Bowes	Gloryhammer	5:13
4.	"Goblin King of the Darkstorm Galaxy"	Bowes	Bowes, Turk, Templing	3:38
5.	"The Hollywood Hootsman"	Bowes	Bowes, Templing, Turk	3:54
6.	"Victorious Eagle Warfare"	Bowes	Bowes, Turk, Templing	4:59
7.	"Questlords of Inverness, Ride to the Galactic Fortress!"	Bowes, Thomas Winkler	Bowes, Winkler, Turk, Templing	5:22
8.	"Universe on Fire"	Bowes, Winkler	Bowes, Turk	4:06
9.	"Heroes (of Dundee)"	Winkler, Bowes	Winkler, Bowes, Turk, Templing	5:49
10.	"Apocalypse 1992"	Bowes	Turk, Bowes, Winkler	9:38
Total length:				48:15

Physical Version Hidden Track
No.	Title	Length
11.	"Dundax Aeterna"	4:26
Total length:		52:42

Japanese Edition Bonus Track
No.	Title	Length
11.	"Universe On Fire (Spaghetti Space Western Remix)"	4:12
Total length:		52:28

All orchestrations scored and conducted by Ben Turk.

Apocalypse Suite For Orchestra & Choir (Deluxe Edition Disc 2)
No.	Title	Music	Length
11.	"Main Title"	Turk	2:02
12.	"The Attack on Triton"	Bowes, Turk, Templing	3:58
13.	"Angus McFife XIII's Theme"	Gloryhammer	5:16
14.	"An Evil Wizard Does a Quest"	Bowes, Turk, Templing	3:38
15.	"The King of California"	Bowes, Templing, Turk	3:52
16.	"Ser Proletius Returns"	Bowes, Turk, Templing	4:58
17.	"Lords of Space and Time"	Bowes, Winkler, Turk, Templing	5:22
18.	"To Claim Space Throne"	Bowes, Turk	4:04
19.	"An Epic War is Fight"	Winkler, Bowes, Turk, Templing	5:50
20.	"Dundee Will Fall"	Turk, Bowes, Winkler	9:50
Total length:			1:36:50

== Personnel ==
Gloryhammer

- Thomas Winkler (Angus McFife XIII) – vocals
- Christopher Bowes (Zargothrax) – keyboards
- Paul Templing (Ser Proletius) – guitars
- James Cartwright (The Hollywood Hootsman) – bass
- Ben Turk (Ralathor) – drums, orchestration

Choir

- Amy Turk, Dominic Sewell, Laura Trundle

Production

- Lasse Lammert – production, engineering, mixing, mastering
- Dan Goldsworthy – artwork, layout
- Robert Zembrzycki – photography

== Charts ==
Chart (2015)	Peak position
Belgian Albums (Ultratop Flanders)	100
Belgian Albums (Ultratop Wallonia)	121
German Albums (Offizielle Top 100)	53
Scottish Albums (OCC)	100
Swiss Albums (Schweizer Hitparade)	64
UK Independent Albums (OCC)	30
UK Rock & Metal Albums (OCC)	18
