= Gloryhammer =

British power metal band

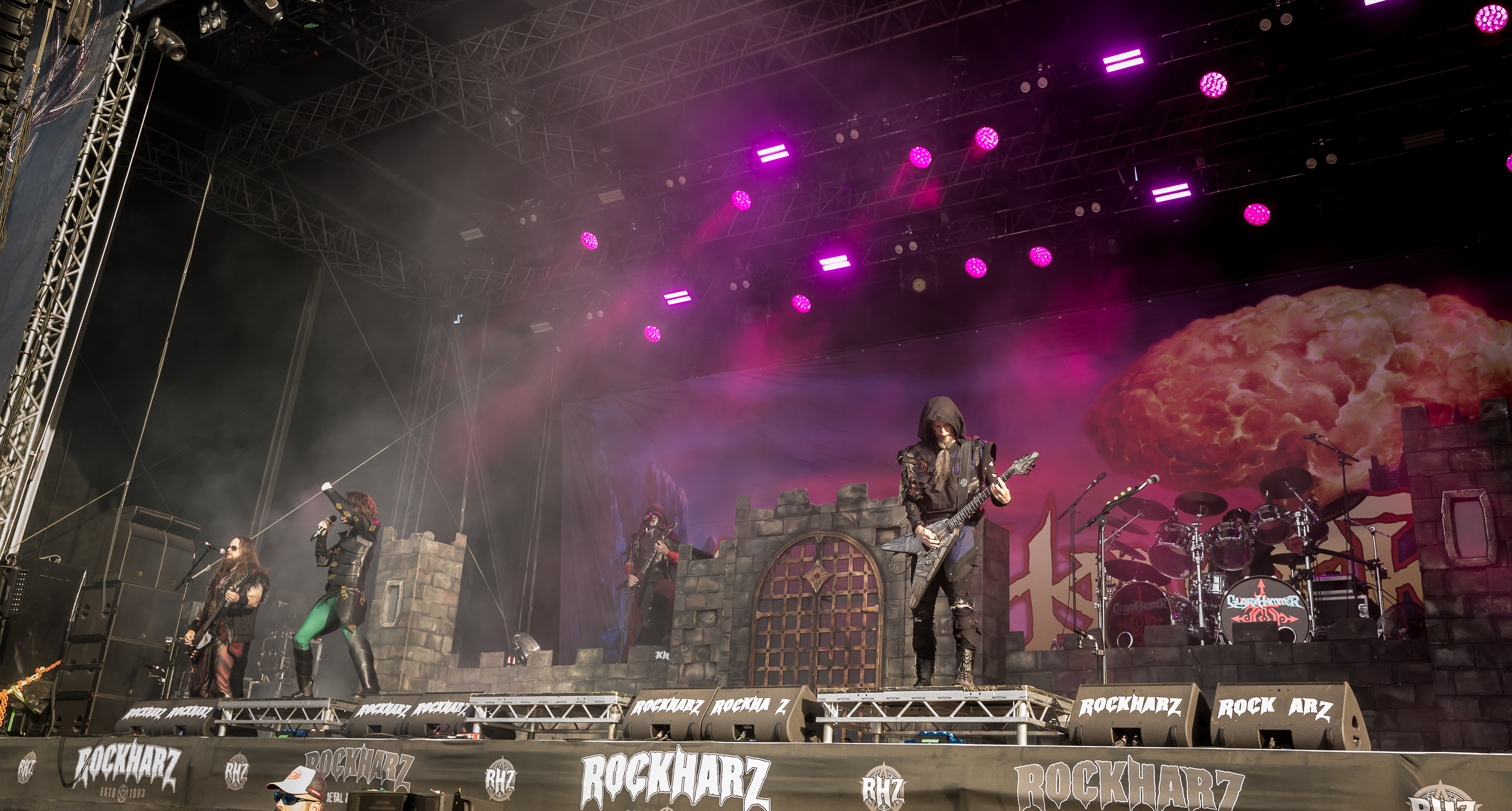
- Gloryhammer performing in 2025

Background information
- Origin: United Kingdom
- Genre: Power metal
- Years active: 2010–present
- Label: Napalm
- Members: Christopher Bowes; Ben Turk; Paul Templing; James Cartwright; Sozos Michael
- Past members: Anthony Trimming; Thomas Winkler; Michael Barber
- Website: gloryhammer.com

Gloryhammer are a British power metal band founded by keyboardist Christopher Bowes, lead vocalist of the band Alestorm. Each member of the band represents a character in the story concept. Band members appear on stage in armour and costumes to represent their respective characters.

== History ==
Gloryhammer released their debut album Tales from the Kingdom of Fife through Napalm Records on 29 March, 2013. Prior to the release of the album, the single "Angus McFife" was released through the Napalm's YouTube channel on 7 March 2013.

The band released videos on Napalm's channel for "Universe on Fire" on 8 August 2015 and "Rise of The Chaos Wizards" on 11 September 2015. On 25 September 2015, Gloryhammer released their second studio album titled Space 1992: Rise of the Chaos Wizards with which the band entered the official album charts in several countries, followed by tours with bands such as Stratovarius, Blind Guardian and HammerFall.

On 16 May 2017, Gloryhammer was nominated as best band in the category "Up & Coming" of the Metal Hammer Awards 2017 by the German edition of international music magazine Metal Hammer. In 2018, the band was nominated again in the same category.

In January 2018, the band did a headlining tour across Europe, consisting of 24 shows in a row.

In September 2018, they toured with Alestorm through North America for the first time, playing 19 shows in the USA and Canada.

On 30 January 2019, the band's official Facebook page announced the album Legends from Beyond the Galactic Terrorvortex, which was released on 31 May 2019. The band released two singles, "Gloryhammer" on 12 April 2019 and "The Siege of Dunkeld (In Hoots We Trust)" on 10 May 2019, through the Napalm YouTube.

Following the album's release was the band's first North American tour as headliners in June with Æther Realm as support.

On 22 August 2021, Gloryhammer announced that Thomas Winkler had left the band. Winkler addressed the situation, stating he was fired via an email that cited the band's reasons for his departure as disagreements on business and organizational matters. Shortly after, a Twitter account named "GloryhammerC" posted screenshots of what appeared to be an internal chat from 2017 between the members of the group that showed misogynist and racist humour along with several racial slurs. At the same time allegations of domestic violence committed by James Cartwright also surfaced. Æther Realm bassist Vincent Jackson Jones, who collaborated with Gloryhammer keyboardist Chris Bowes in the band Wizardthrone, released a statement on 26 August 2021 distancing himself professionally from Bowes and urging Bowes to make his own statement; at the time, none of Gloryhammer's members had made public comments on the issue. On 5 September 2021, a statement released by Gloryhammer, and a separate statement released by Bowes, admitted the leaked chat was true and apologizing for the controversial remarks. However they also stated that the claims regarding Cartwright and the alleged abuse were false.

In December 2021, Sozos Michael was introduced as the new singer of the band. They released their first single with Michael as lead singer, titled "Fly Away", on 28 April 2022. On 14 March 2023, the fourth studio album, Return to the Kingdom of Fife, was announced and later released on 2 June 2023. The band released three singles in support of the album: "Keeper of the Celestial Flame of Abernethy", "Holy Flaming Hammer of Unholy Cosmic Frost" and "Wasteland Warrior Hoots Patrol".

== Band members ==
Current

- Christopher Bowes (Zargothrax) – keyboards, backing vocals (2010–present)
- Paul Templing (Ser Proletius) – guitars, backing vocals (2010–present)
- James Cartwright (The Hootsman) – bass, backing vocals (2010–present)
- Ben Turk (Ralathor) – drums (2010–present)
- Sozos Michael (Angus McFife) – lead vocals (2021–present)

Former

- Anthony Trimming (Antonio Trimmioni) – lead vocals (2010)
- Thomas Winkler (Angus McFife) – lead vocals (2011–2021)
- Michael Barber (Zargothrax) – keyboards, backing vocals (2016–2026), guitars (2024–2026)

== Discography ==
Studio albums

- Tales from the Kingdom of Fife (2013)
- Space 1992: Rise of the Chaos Wizards (2015)
- Legends from Beyond the Galactic Terrorvortex (2019)
- Return to the Kingdom of Fife (2023)
- Space 1993: Wrath of Kor-Virliath (2026)

Singles

- "Angus McFife" (2013)
- "Universe on Fire" (2015)
- "Rise of the Chaos Wizards" (2015)
- "Gloryhammer" (2019)
- "The Siege of Dunkeld (In Hoots We Trust)" (2019)
- "Fly Away" (2022)
- "Keeper of the Celestial Flame of Abernethy" (2023)
- "Holy Flaming Hammer of Unholy Cosmic Frost" (2023)
- "Wasteland Warrior Hoots Patrol" (2023)
- "Mighty Wings" (2023)
- "He Has Returned" (2024)
- "On a Quest For Aberdeen" (2025)
- "Ultimate Sacrifice" (2026)
- "Die with a Sword in My Hand" (2026)
- "Warriors of Auchtermuchty" (2026)
- "Starfighters of Leuchars" (2026)

== Tours ==
- June 2013 - Netherlands show with Magnetron.
- September - October 2013 - "The Epic Tour of Furious Thunder" European tour with Darkest Era and Dendera.
- April - May 2014 - Australian Tour supported by Lagerstein.
- December 2014 - "The Unicorn Invasion of Europe" European tour with Shear and Twilight Force.
- October - November 2015 - "Eternal World Tour 2015" with Stratovarius and supported by Divine Ascension.
- May 2016 - "Beyond the Red Mirror Tour: Part II" supporting Blind Guardian.
- January - February 2017 - "Hammerfall: Built to Tour 2017" with Hammerfall and supported by Lancer.
- January 2018 - "European Tour MMXVII" European tour with Civil War and supported by Dendera.
- September 2018 - American tour supporting Alestorm.
- June 2019 - "North American Galactic Terrortour" North American tour with Æther Realm.
- October 2019 - "Intergalactic Terrortour" UK tour with Beast in Black and supported by Wind Rose.
- November - December 2019 - "The Sacrament of Sin Tour 2019" with Powerwolf.
- January - February 2020 - "European Galactic Terrortour" European tour with Nekrogoblikon and Wind Rose
- November - December 2021 - UK Tour with Alestorm, supported by Bootyard Bandits
- June 2022 - European tour supported by Warkings and Elvenking
- September 2022 - UK Tour supported by Brothers of Metal and Arion
- January - February 2023 - European tour with Alestorm and supported by Rumahoy and Wind Rose
- May 2023 - United States tour with Alestorm and supported by Lutharo
- November 2023 - "Return to the Kingdom of Australia" supported by Rumahoy.
- January - February 2024 - "Glory and the Beast" with Beast in Black and Brothers of Metal
- March 2024 - "The Red, White and Hoots Tour" supported by Twilight Force
- January - February 2025 - "No Sleep til Auchtertool" supported by Dominum and Fellowship
