= Robert William Cole =

British author (1869–1937)

Robert William Cole (6 April 1869 - 12 November 1937) was born in Heston, Middlesex and studied law at Balliol, Oxford, intending to become a barrister, but instead worked as a professional photographer and author. Some of his works are early science fiction and future war fiction. His writing is most notable for an early description of war in space, but had little influence on the history of science fiction because it was published by small presses and received little public attention. He died in Dawlish in Devon, aged 68. Most of Cole's works are out of print and are difficult to find. Copies can be found at the British Library, and two have been republished in scholarly editions.

== Works ==
=== The Struggle for Empire: A Story of the Year 2236 (1900) ===
An early space opera. A scholarly edition edited by Richard Bleiler is available from the English publishers Pickering & Chatto as part of their 2013 "Political Future Fiction" series.

=== His Other Self: The Story of a Man with a Past (1906) ===
A former wastrel has found love and turned over a new leaf, but is intermittently possessed by his rakish past self, given to drinking, chasing loose women, etc., in order to teach him a moral lesson. The hero is prepared to renounce his fiancée to ensure that her life will be happy, even if he is miserable. This proves that he is worthy of her. The haunting ends, and they marry.

=== The Death Trap (1907) ===
Germany, France, and Russia go to war with Britain, the French under duress, the others willingly. They destroy the British fleet, and invade southern England. Britain is nearly defeated and as profiteering, government bungling and the acts of German agents bring the country close to revolution, a heroic general is called upon to lead the country to victory. With the aid of the Japanese navy (the Japanese remember Britain as allies during war with Russia), he engages the German fleet at the last moment. France switches sides prior to the battle, and the enemy fleet is turned away. Included in Pickering & Chatto's 2000 British Future Fiction series.

=== The Artificial Girl (1908) ===
A romantic comedy in which a young man disguises himself as his own sister, then takes her place at a ladies' finishing school, in order to pursue the woman he loves.
