= Space Opera (1974 anthology) =

- First edition
- Editor: Brian Aldiss
- Cover artist: Eddie Jones
- Language: English
- Genre: Science fiction
- Publisher: Futura
- Publication date: August 1974
- Publication place: United States
- Media type: Print (hardback & paperback)
- Pages: 324
- ISBN: 978-0-86007-058-0

Space Opera is a 1974 anthology of classic science fiction short stories edited by Brian Aldiss.

== Contents ==
- "Introduction" (Brian W. Aldiss)
- "Is Everything an Illusion?" (Brian W. Aldiss)
- "Zirn Left Unguarded, the Jenghik Palace in Flames, Jon Westerley Dead" (1972) (Robert Sheckley)
- "Honeymoon in Space" (excerpt from A Honeymoon in Space) (1901) (George Griffith)
- "The Red Brain" (1927) (Donald Wandrei) (appeared in Futura edition only)
- "Tonight the Sky Will Fall" (1952) (Daniel F. Galouye)
- "Precipices of Light That Went Forever Up ...." (Brian W. Aldiss)
- "The Star of Life" (excerpt) (1947) (Edmond Hamilton)
- "After Ixmal" (1962) (Jeff Sutton)
- "Sea Change" (1956) (Thomas N. Scortia)
- "Exile Is Our Lot" (Brian W. Aldiss)
- "Breaking Point" (1953) (James E. Gunn) (appeared in Futura edition only)
- "Colony" (1953) (Philip K. Dick) (did not appear in Futura edition)
- The Sword of Rhiannon (excerpt) (1949) (Leigh Brackett)
- "All Summer in a Day" (1954) (Ray Bradbury)
- "The Mitr" (1953) (Jack Vance)
- "The Godlike Machines" (Brian W. Aldiss)
- "The Storm" (1943) (A. E. van Vogt)
- "The Paradox Men" (1949) (Charles Harness)
- "Time Fuze" (1954) (Randall Garrett)
- "The Last Question" (1956) (Isaac Asimov)
- "Answer" (1954) (Fredric Brown) (appeared in Futura edition only)
- "Envoi" (Brian W. Aldiss)
