= Scott Shaw (artist) =

American cartoonist and animator

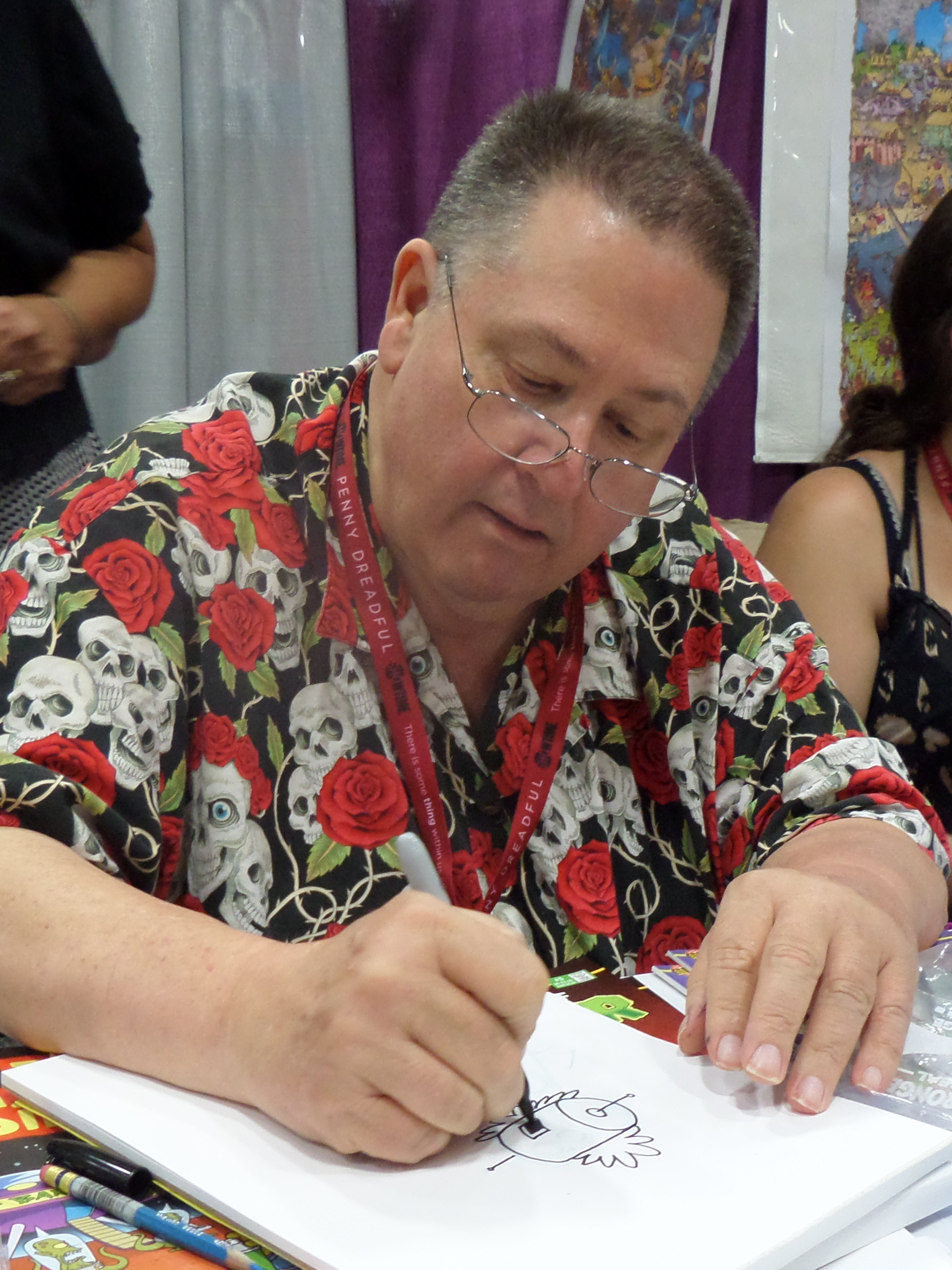
- Shaw at the 2014 San Diego Comic-Con
- Born: September 4, 1951 (age 75) Queens, New York City, New York, U.S.
- Areas: Writer, Penciller
- Awards: Inkpot Award, 1980

Scott Shaw (born September 4, 1951) is an American cartoonist, animator, and historian of comics. Among Shaw's comic-book work is Hanna-Barbera's The Flintstones (for Marvel Comics and Harvey Comics), Captain Carrot and His Amazing Zoo Crew (for DC Comics), and Simpsons Comics (for Bongo Comics). He was also the first artist for Archie Comics' Sonic the Hedgehog comic book series.

== Biography ==
Shaw began selling his artwork while still in his teens after choosing a career as a cartoonist. Throughout the 1970s, he contributed numerous stories to various underground comix. He also found work as an inker and then as a writer and penciller for a line of Hanna-Barbera comics which were originally published by Marvel Comics. Eventually, in 1978, he was hired to the Hanna-Barbera staff and became layout supervisor and character designer on NBC's The New Fred and Barney Show (starring the Flintstones) Saturday morning cartoon series. Shaw's first published work appeared in the underground comic book Gory Stories Quarterly.

He and Roy Thomas co-created Captain Carrot and His Amazing Zoo Crew! which first appeared in a special insert in The New Teen Titans #16 (Feb. 1982), followed by a series published from 1982 to 1983.

Shaw both wrote and drew for Archie Comics' Sonic the Hedgehog early on in the series' run. Most recently, he has become involved in the long-running litigation between Ken Penders and the publishers over copyright and character ownership.

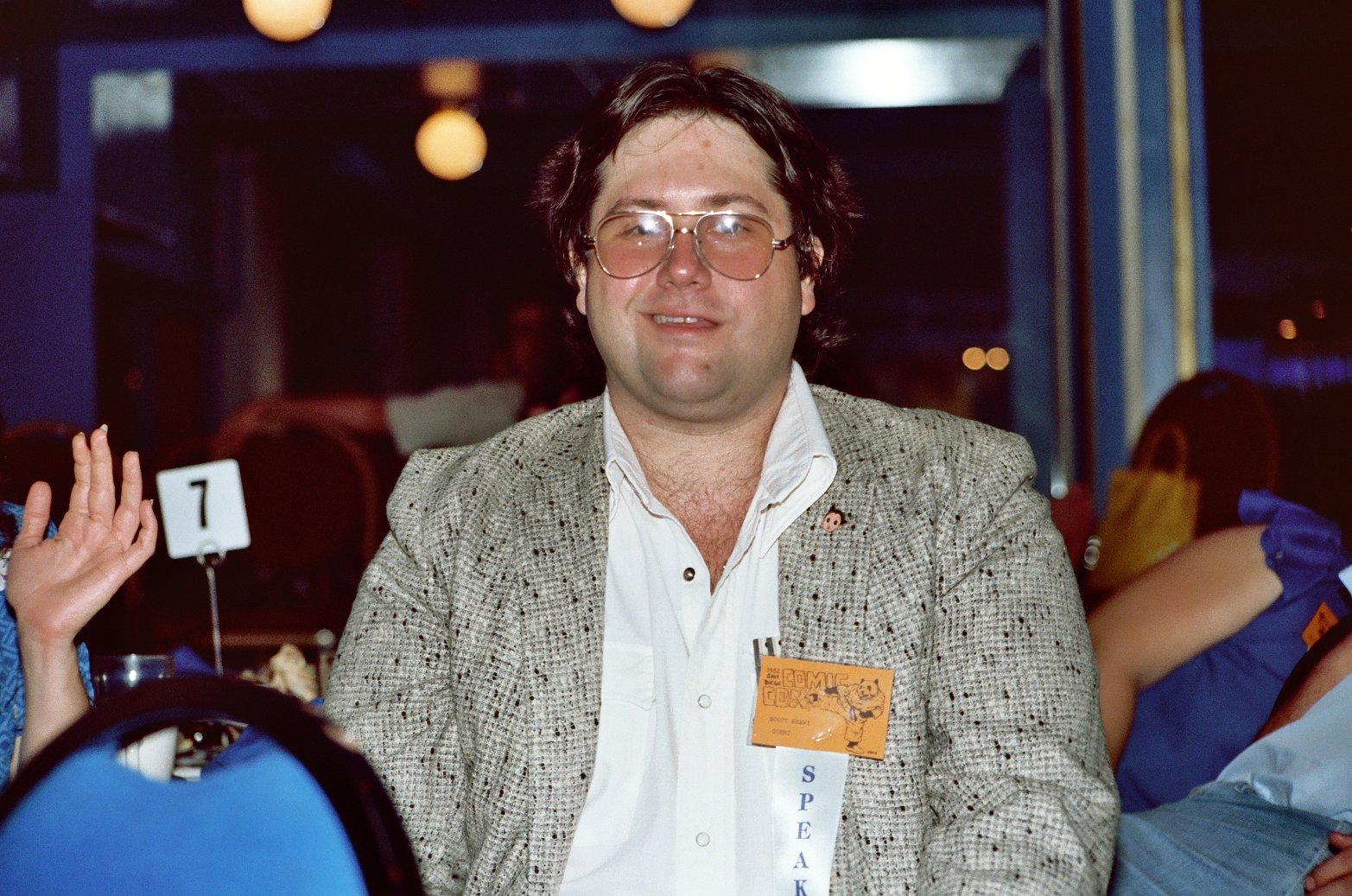
Shaw at the 1982 San Diego Comic-Con

Shaw's work in TV animation includes producing and directing The Completely Mental Misadventures of Ed Grimley for Hanna-Barbera, starring Martin Short, and Camp Candy for DiC, starring John Candy. He was also awarded four Emmy Awards for his work as a story director/storyboard artist on CBS' Jim Henson's Muppet Babies (Marvel Productions). Shaw has also worked on dozens of other cartoon series, including Krypto the Superdog, Johnny Test, What's New, Scooby-Doo?, Duck Dodgers, American Dragon: Jake Long, Fantastic Four, Richie Rich, Popeye and Son, The Smurfs, The Snorks, Garfield and Friends and The Bungle Brothers segments of Tex Avery's The Kwicky Koala Show and many others. Shaw also worked on Disney's direct-to-DVD Mickey's Twice Upon a Christmas and Mulan 2.

For nearly 10 years, Shaw was the Senior Art Director of Ogilvy & Mather in Los Angeles, where he co-wrote, co-directed, storyboarded and designed hundreds of animated TV commercials for Post Fruity and Cocoa Pebbles cereal. He also wrote and drew many print ads for the product, and has designed and illustrated many of the cereal's packages.

Shaw has also designed lines of action figures of Hanna-Barbera and Simpsons characters for McFarlane Toys.

He co-founded San Diego Comic-Con in 1970 alongside Shel Dorf, Richard Alf, Ken Krueger, Mike Towry, Barry Alfonso, Bob Sourk and Greg Bear.

In June 1977, Shaw was a charter member of CAPS – The Comic Art Professional Society and has served as past president of the organization.

For 10 years, Shaw wrote a column on the Comic Book Resources website titled "Oddball Comics", where he selected comic and magazine issues noted for their strangeness and provided facts and commentary on them. It served as the basis for a digital slide show he has presented at comics conventions.

Shaw was the initial artist photographed in his studio for The Artist Within: Portraits of Cartoonists, Comic Book Artists, Animators and Others by photographer Greg Preston, published by Dark Horse Books in 2007. Shaw is credited by Preston with suggesting the idea for the project.

== Awards ==
Shaw was a recipient of the Inkpot Award in 1980 from San Diego Comic-Con.
