= Ken Krueger =

American publisher (1926–2009)

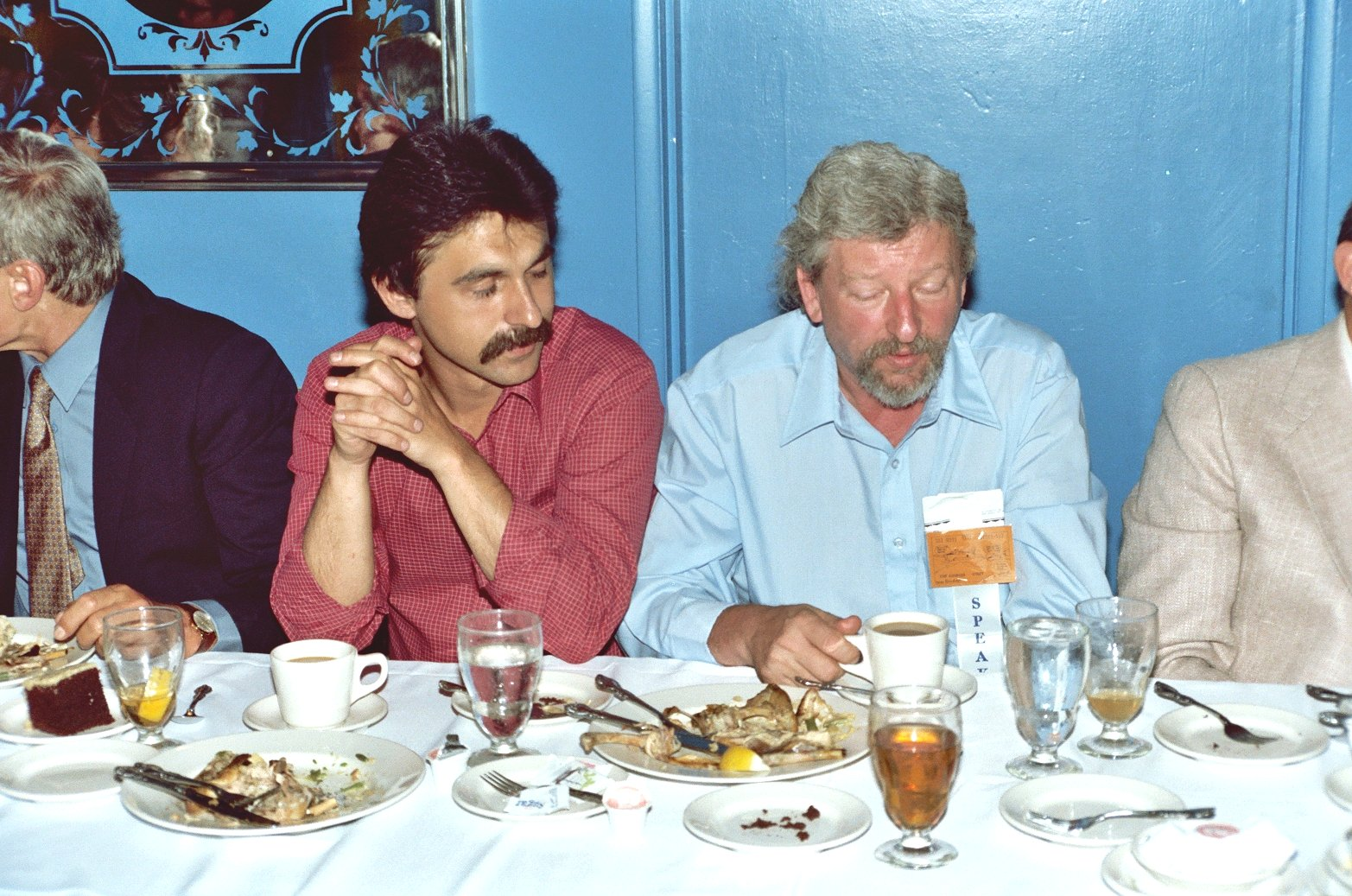
- Ken Krueger (right) with Jon Hartz (left) at the 1982 San Diego Comic-Con
- Born: October 7, 1926; New York, United States
- Died: November 21, 2009 (age 83); Lockport, New York, United States
- Occupations: Comic-Con co-founder, editor, publisher
- Children: 8

Ken Krueger (October 7, 1926 – November 21, 2009) was an American publisher and retailer. Krueger co-founded and organized the first San Diego Comic-Con, then called "San Diego's Golden State Comic-Con," in 1970. Krueger co-created the annual convention with a group of San Diego friends, including Shel Dorf, Richard Alf and Mike Towry.

== Biography ==
Kenneth J. Krueger, Jr. was born in upstate New York. Krueger was a Buffalo, New York, based member and co-founder of the Buffalo Fantasy League, Bohemia Club, and publisher of the semi-pro Pegasus Publications—most noted for the first appearance of science fiction writer Wilson Tucker’s Prison Planet in Space Trails (Pegasus Publications, Summer 1947).

Krueger later founded Shroud: Publishers, Kenneth J. Krueger: Publisher, Valcour-Krueger, and Fantasy House.

Krueger was also a focal point for an ambitious group of young comic book fans who planned and hosted the event that became San Diego Comic-Con, serving as chairman of the group’s first multi-day event, the San Diego Golden State Comic-Con held August 1–3, 1970.

== Early Science Fiction Fan Activity ==
Krueger began writing letters to science fiction magazines in 1938, at the age of eleven, and was an attendee of the very first “scientifiction” convention held in 1939, officially making him a member of the elite-if-obscure group known as First Fandom.

As a resident of the New York area, he attended the first World Science Fiction Convention (Worldcon) on July 2–4, 1939, at age twelve, in New York City, the first science fiction convention ever held. Already an ardent science fiction fan, by age seventeen Krueger was also a member of the Slan Shack crowd (along with a very young Frank M. Robinson, Jr.).

The Slan Shack, which first appeared at the end of October 1943, was where a batch of active Battle Creek, Michigan, science fiction fans lived for nearly two years. Here dwelt the Ashley's, Walt Liebscher, and Jack Weidenbeck, and later noted science fiction author E. Everett Evans. They all moved en masse on September 7, 1945, to another site on Bixel Street, Los Angeles, cheek by jowl with the LASFS (Los Angeles Science Fantasy Society) clubroom. (It was the ground floor of a duplex next door. Its upper floor, “Slan Shack Annex”, was rented occasionally to struggling fen and pros.) The place didn't break up till the building was torn down in March 1948 to make room for an office building.

The original Battle Creek Slan Shack opened on October 30, 1943, when the Ashley's bought the eight-room house at 25 Popular Street, and simultaneously held the first Michicon.

The fourth Michicon was held at Slan Shack from June 17 to 19, 1944. While in attendance, the young Ziff-Davis office boy, Frank Robinson, showed extreme valor by publishing two issues of Fanewscard during the con. Some 23 fans were there, including travelers Lynn Bridges, of Florida, and a seventeen-year-old Ken Krueger of Buffalo.

Frank Robinson, in his memoir, Not So Good a Gay Man (TOR, 2017), writes of "having a crush" on his friend, Ken Krueger, and almost making a pass at him during the Michicon.

In the fall of 1944, over Labor Day weekend, Krueger hosted the first BuffaloCon, in his mother's house. In attendance were Don Wollheim and Elsia Balter (later Mrs. Wollheim), Damon Knight, and Larry Shaw. Oliver “Ollie” Saari of Flint, Michigan, a mechanical engineer working for GM, was there. As well as Frank Robinson, all the way from Chicago.

Krueger began editing his first science fiction fanzine, Abortions, in 1952. Science fiction writer Rog Phillips reviewed the first issue in his The Club House column in the February 1952 issue of Amazing Stories.

Not content with editing his own fanzine, Krueger was a regular contributor to the Buffalo Fantasy League's official club fanzine, Hyperopia, which was edited by fellow club member, Robert J. Fritz. Even as far back as July 1952, when the first issue of Hyperopia appeared, readers knew Ken Krueger and held him in very high regard.

In 1952 Krueger was nominated and elected as Progressive Fandom's candidate to the post of president of the National Fantasy Fan Federation, but he declined the nomination.

== Ken Krueger, Publisher ==
=== The Buffalo Book Company ===
In 1945 Grant-Hadley Enterprises published its first effort: a 26-page pamphlet Rhode Island on Lovecraft which consisted of five articles on H.P. Lovecraft by Rhode Islanders who had been associated with the writer during his lifetime. Two editions of this title were printed.

Meeting in a well-known Providence, Rhode Island, landmark, Dana's Old Corner Bookstore, the two science fiction fans decided to publish a small volume about Lovecraft. After all, the Old Corner Bookstore had purchased H.P. Lovecraft's library from his estate, so what better place, and subject to begin publishing. The two partners, Donald M. Grant and Thomas G. Hadley, having been bit by the publishing bug, moved on to their next reincarnation as The Buffalo Book Company, with the addition of yet another partner, Kenneth J. Krueger, Jr.

The two initial partners, Grant and Hadley, knew from their experience producing and attempting to distribute the Lovecraft pamphlet that they would have problems distributing any new titles or any new books. As their business plan expanded they sought the help of Ken Krueger, bringing him on board as the third partner for their newly planned, but not yet started, publishing company.

Krueger, at the age of twenty-one, was already recognized for his knowledge of book distribution.

This was the final key, and the three were ready to begin. The key to turning all their ideas from dreams to reality lay in Krueger's extensive mailing list from his successful mail-order book distribution business. With Krueger as the final partner the three men were ready to form The Buffalo Book Company and make some real money.

In 1945, The Buffalo Book Company was formed by Donald M. Grant, Thomas G. Hadley of Providence, Rhode Island, and Kenneth J. Krueger, who lived in Buffalo, New York (hence the name). Krueger even designed their distinctive colophon.

First, The Buffalo Book Company produced the hardbound edition of The Time Stream, by John Taine. The book was successful enough to encourage the three to go on to another book, the first book publication of The Skylark of Space, by E.E. Smith. Due to the publisher, Ken Krueger, and his successful efforts in advertising and distributing the book, it was an instant sell-out.

By the time the third title was in the works, Don Grant was in the military. Krueger had plans for the company, but still in the military as well, was unable to become involved full-time. Without Grant's involvement, Krueger continued his struggle part-time to make the business a success despite Hadley's resistance; help was found in an unexpected quarter. Lloyd Arthur Eshbach contributed a few ideas on how to appeal to the science fiction fan base by placing advertisements in the major magazines.

Grant continued in the military, went on to college after he was discharged, and in 1949 started The Grandon Company; still hooked on publishing science fiction and fantasy.

With Krueger unable to prevent it, Tom Hadley transformed the business once again. Using substantial financial contributions from his family (Hadley thought he didn't need any partners) Hadley tried to go it alone with the Hadley Publishing Co. Hadley used the distribution list and model created by Krueger, and the tips from Eshbach, as well as the various titles of forthcoming works that had once been scheduled for the now defunct Buffalo Book Company to begin. But when the ideas were used up, so was the company.

Eshbach, having whetted himself in the publishing field, went on to found Fantasy Press, once again taking Krueger's extensive mailing list as a building block. Eshbach had several partners to begin with, but was clearly the leading force, and as his partners disappeared from the scene, one after the other, Eshbach carried on alone.

Eshbach saw the potential use of Krueger's distribution list, made a copy, and used it as the basis of his subscription, special order, limited signed copy offer of his list of 47 titles. Thus was born Fantasy Press, one of the most successful and honored small presses, and highly collectible, despite the fact that Eshbach overextended himself and went bankrupt.

Much later, Lloyd Arthur Eshbach, in his autobiographical account, as given in his memoir Over My Shoulder, disingenuously stated that he could not get a clear picture of Krueger's contributions to the publishing field and did not find anything of importance that Krueger contributed to the genre.

As far as The Buffalo Book Company and its efforts, The Skylark of Space, by E.E. Smith, in collaboration with Lee Hawkins Garby, was plagued with the obvious signs of the beginning writer on the part of all concerned. Doc Smith later told how he collaborated with his neighbor's wife, Lee Hawkins Garby, for help writing scenes involving women. Later he would drop all reference to her help in subsequent reprints of this title.

The publisher's name doesn't appear on the copyright page. The front of the book is stamped in a hand-lettered logotype and in the same logo at the base of the spine. Krueger even designed the logo for the company. Allan Halladay, the printer of the book, designed the jacket. However, with all these flaws, and contributions, it was Skylark in book form.

Ken Krueger is one of the unsung heroes of science fiction and fandom. Yet he is not even mentioned in Advent:Publishers, Hugo Award winning, The Encyclopedia of Science Fiction and Fantasy.

Krueger was active in publishing for many years. After leaving military service, he founded Shroud: Publishers and later Kenneth J. Krueger: Publisher, along with several smaller semi-professional publications, including Valcour-Krueger, Fantasy House, and Pegasus Publications.

=== Shroud: Publishers ===
Shroud: Publishers, begun in 1954, was financed, in the beginning at least, by one Robert J. Fritz, a friend and fellow member of the Buffalo Fantasy League. Kenneth J. Krueger was editor-in-chief, and became so identified with Shroud that few people even remember R.J. Fritz. The press was also associated with a paperback publisher, SSR (Snappy Space Rocket) Publications (including early works by one of the original five Advent:Publishers founders Robert Briney writing as Don Duane). All of it—Shroud and SSR—passed finally to Ken Krueger, who retained the back stock, the copyrights, and the Shroud name as a series title.

Under the Shroud imprint, Krueger published such titles as: The Maker of Moons, by Robert W. Chambers (1954); Look Behind You, by Arthur J. Burks (1954); The Female Demon, by William McDougle (1955); and perhaps his best-known publication, The Dream Quest of Unknown Kadath, by H.P. Lovecraft (1955); which was followed by one of his least-known titles, The Motive Key, by Jack Woodford (1956).

Of some small note: The Dream Quest of Unknown Kadath as published by Shroud was the very first appearance of this title in hardcover. August Derleth had published the story for the first time in his periodical, Arkham Sampler (Winter 1948 issue) under his Arkham House imprint. Krueger, with his Shroud imprint published the first separate appearance and the first hardcover of this title. It is the most elusive and costly of all Lovecraft's printed works, equal to if not exceeding even The Outsider and Others, the first hardcover title published by Arkham House.

=== Kenneth J. Krueger: Publishers ===
Kenneth J. Krueger used his own name for his next publishing operation (1958-1965) after Shroud had lapsed; even though Krueger kept selling his leftover copies as well as being a general book dealer.

Under the Kenneth J. Krueger imprint, Krueger published such notable classic titles from the early predawn era of science fiction and horror literature as: The Moon Maker, by Arthur Train and Robert Wood (1958); and what is undoubtedly the very best, now long forgotten, horror story ever written, The Fearsome Island, by Albert Kinross (1965).

=== Shroud Returns ===
After a time he decided to publish again, retaining the Shroud name as a series title.

For his return to the Shroud imprint, Ken choose to publish a memorial tribute to his best friend and mentor, fellow member of First Fandom and fellow resident of the famous Slan Shack, E. Everett Evans.

Food for Demons (1971) consisted of story selections and “appreciations” from Doc Smith, Mel Hunter, Forrest J Ackerman, A.E. van Vogt, Ray Bradbury, Walter J. Daugherty, Henry M. Eichner, Walt Leibscher, and of course, one by Ken Krueger.

Food for Demons (Shroud: Publishers, San Diego, CA, 1971, 154 pp., $3.95) was printed for Ken Krueger by Donald M. Grant in 1959, but not bound until 1969. The cover was done in 1970. Some are hand-colored by either Henry M. Eichner or Krueger. The “true” hardcovers (13 issued to contributors and friends) reflect the original New York address of Shroud. However, all of the paper copies reflect Krueger's mid-1960s move to San Diego.

== San Diego Comic-Con ==
By 1968 Krueger had relocated to San Diego, and partnered with a local pulp collector, John Hull, to open a bookstore in Ocean Beach, California. John Hull, who lived in Chula Vista, was a neighbor of Greg Bear, and let the precocious teen have the run of his garage-stored science fiction collection, thus bringing Bear into fandom.

The two would supplement their book sales by reselling pornography lifted from the Greenleaf Classics stock by Earl Kemp, and sold to them at a discount.

Greg Bear, Mike Towry, along with comic artist Scott Shaw, and other friends, formed their own science fiction fan club, “The ProFanests” and hung out at Krueger's flyblown establishment, discussing the latest batch of “Ace Doubles” with the walk-in locals who frequented the place.

On August 1–3, 1970, Ken Krueger hosted the first local comic book convention. The first San Diego Golden State Comic Convention, held in the basement of the U.S. Grant Hotel. The convention, for its day, was a rousing success. The U.S. Grant Hotel was not the snazziest of venues, but it was the only one in town willing to risk hosting an event that would garner such a low bar-attendance. Ken Krueger was instrumental with founding the event. Krueger invited his long time friend from science fiction fandom, Earl Kemp, Vice President of Greenleaf Classics, to speak at the Con. Earl Kemp followed San Diego Evening Tribune editorial cartoonist Bob Stevens onto the podium.

For the rest of his life Krueger worked as a publisher, editor, and distributor for the comic and sci-fi industries. In the early 1990s, he was employed by Capital City Distribution as the firm's West Coast sales representative. He published and released the first works of several science fiction and comic authors, including Greg Bear, Scott Shaw, Dave Stevens, and Jim Valentino. In 2009, Valentino called Krueger "my mentor".

== After the Con ==
Krueger moved to Buffalo, New York, in 2002. Retired, but not quite done, Krueger continued to attend the local Buffalo-area pulp and comic conventions with his lifelong pal, and fellow co-founder of Pegasus Publications and the Buffalo Fantasy League, Paul Ganly.

Krueger and other co-founders were honored for their contributions by San Diego Comic-Con in 2009.

Krueger died of a heart attack on November 21, 2009, in Lockport, New York, at age 83, eighteen days after the passing of fellow Comic-Con founder Shel Dorf. Krueger was survived by his eight children.
