= Inkpot Award =

Comics award

- Awarded for: Professionals in the fields of comic books, comic strips, animation, science fiction, and related areas of pop culture
- Location: San Diego, California, U.S.
- Country: United States
- Presented by: San Diego Comic-Con
- Hosted by: San Diego Comic-Con
- First award: 1974; 52 years ago

The Inkpot Award is an honor bestowed annually since 1974 by Comic-Con International. It is given to professionals in the fields of comic books, comic strips, animation, science fiction, and related areas of popular culture, at Comic-Con International's annual convention, San Diego Comic-Con. Also eligible are members of Comic-Con's board of directors and convention committee.

The recipients, listed below, are known primarily as comics creators, including writers, artists, letterers, colorists, editors, or publishers, unless otherwise noted.

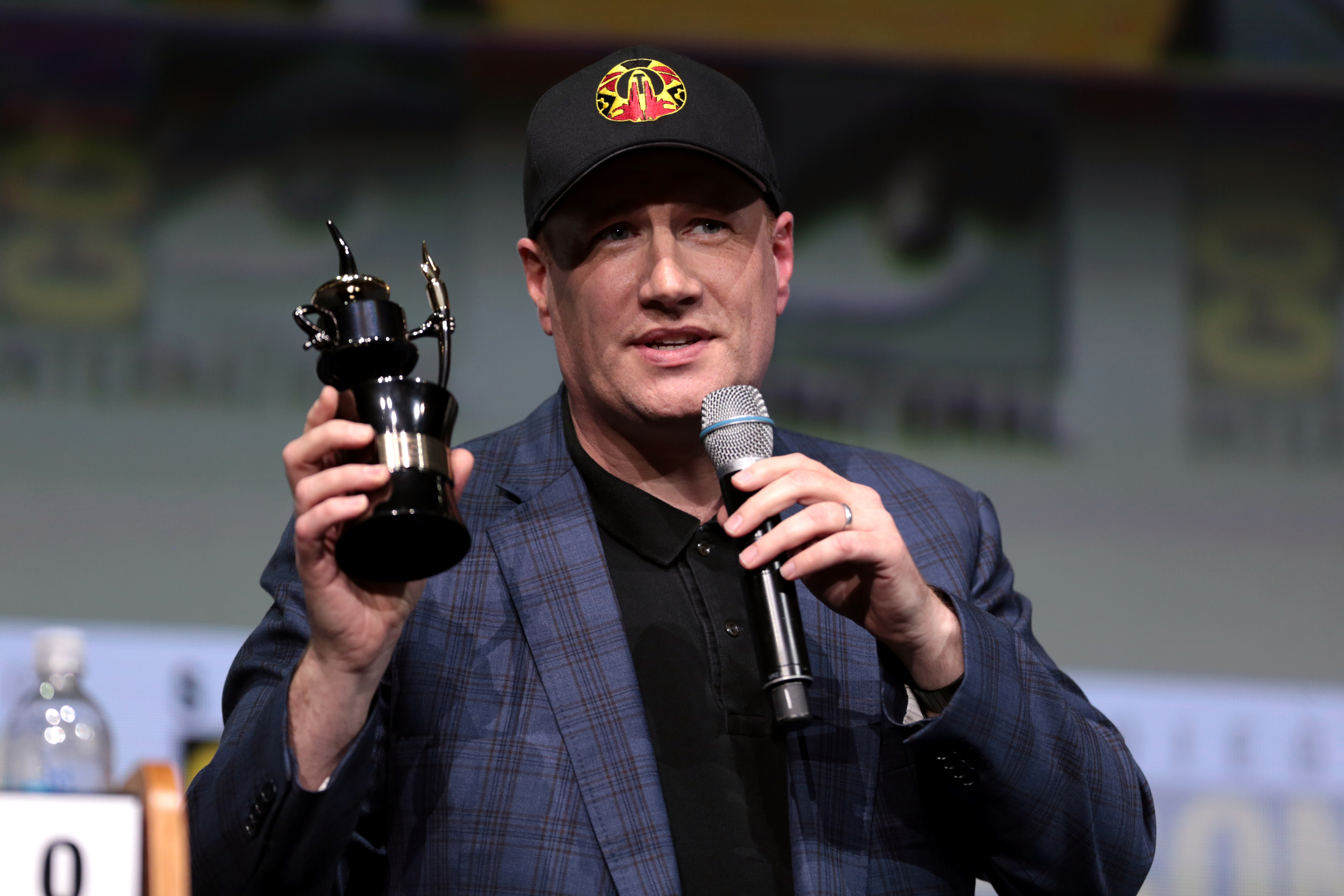
Kevin Feige receiving the Inkpot Award at the 2017 San Diego Comic-Con

== Awards by year ==
Source: 1974–2007, 1974–2011, 1974–2013

=== 1970s ===
==== 1974 ====
- Forrest J. Ackerman (magazine editor)
- Ray Bradbury (prose writer)
- Kirk Alyn (actor)
- Milton Caniff
- Frank Capra (filmmaker)
- Bob Clampett (animator)
- June Foray (voice actress)
- Eric Hoffman (film historian)
- Chuck Jones (animator)
- Jack Kirby
- Stan Lee
- Bill Lund / William R. Lund (actor/writer/founding member of San Diego Comic-Con)
- Russ Manning
- Russell Myers (creator of 'Broom Hilda' comic strip)
- Charles Schulz
- Phil Seuling (Comic Art Convention founder)
- Roy Thomas
- Bjo Trimble (science-fiction fandom figure)

==== 1975 ====
- Barry Alfonso (writer/founding member of San Diego Comic-Con)
- Brad Anderson
- Robert Bloch (prose writer)
- Vaughn Bodē (cartoonist)
- Edgar Rice Burroughs (prose writer)
- Daws Butler (voice actor)
- Richard Butner (Comic-Con Chair-person; no relation to prose writer)
- Shel Dorf ('Founding Father' of San Diego Comic-Con)
- Will Eisner
- Mark Evanier
- Gil Kane
- Alan Light
- Dick Moores
- George Pal (filmmaker)
- Rod Serling (screenwriter)
- Joe Shuster
- Jerry Siegel
- Barry Windsor-Smith
- Jim Starlin
- Jim Steranko
- Theodore Sturgeon (prose writer)
- Larry "Seymour" Vincent (TV horror-movie host)

==== 1976 ====
- Neal Adams
- Sergio Aragonés
- Mel Blanc (voice actor)
- Frank Brunner
- Rick Griffin
- Johnny Hart
- George Clayton Johnson (screenwriter)
- Vicky Kelso (long-time Secretary of San Diego Comic-Con)
- Mell Lazarus
- Sheldon Mayer
- Dale Messick
- Alex Niño
- Don Rico
- Noel Sickles
- Don Thompson
- Maggie Thompson

==== 1977 ====
- Alfredo Alcala
- Carl Barks
- C. C. Beck
- Howard Chaykin
- Lester Dent (prose writer)
- Jackie Estrada
- Hal Foster
- Walter "The Shadow" Gibson (prose writer)
- Jim Harmon (writer/old radio & movie serial historian)
- Robert A. Heinlein (prose writer)
- Gene Henderson (San Diego Comic-Con's Historian & Director-at-Large)
- Michael Kaluta
- Joe Kubert
- Harvey Kurtzman
- George Lucas (filmmaker)
- Stan Lynde
- Byron Preiss
- Trina Robbins
- Stanley Ralph Ross
- Bill Scott
- David Scroggy
- Jay Ward (TV producer)
- Len Wein

==== 1978 ====
- John Buscema
- Al Capp
- Gene Colan
- Gill Fox
- Tom French
- Steve Gerber
- Chester Gould
- Burne Hogarth
- Bob Kane
- Ken Krueger (founding member of San Diego Comic-Con)
- Bernie Lansky
- Gray Morrow
- Clarence Nash
- Grim Natwick
- Bill Rotsler
- Mike Royer
- Gilbert Shelton
- Dave Sheridan
- William Stout
- Frank Thorne
- Boris Vallejo
- Mort Weisinger
- Elmer Woggon

==== 1979 ====
- Craig Anderson
- Steve Englehart
- Dale Enzenbacher
- Kelly Freas
- Virginia French
- H. R. Giger (painter)
- Gene Hazelton
- Carl Macek
- Victor Moscoso
- Larry Niven (prose writer)
- Dan O'Neill
- Virgil Partch
- Jerry Pournelle
- Nestor Redondo
- Marshall Rogers
- John Romita, Sr.
- Bill Spicer
- Mort Walker
- Marv Wolfman

=== 1980s ===
==== 1980 ====
- Terry Austin
- Murray Bishoff
- Pat Boyette
- John Byrne
- National Film Board of Canada
- Ernie Chan
- Chris Claremont
- Shary Flenniken
- Mike Friedrich
- Rick Geary
- Don Glut
- S. Gross
- Al Hartley
- B. Kliban
- Jerry Muller
- Joe Orlando
- Fred Patten
- Don Phelps
- Richard Pini
- Wendy Pini
- David Raskin
- Scott Shaw
- Jim Shooter
- John Stanley
- B. K. Taylor
- Osamu Tezuka
- Adam West
- Wally Wood

==== 1981 ====
- Jerry Bails
- L. B. Cole
- Jim Fitzpatrick (Illustration)
- Dick Giordano
- Dave Graue
- Paul Gulacy
- Mary Henderson
- Karl Hubenthal
- Bil Keane
- Frank Miller
- Doug Moench
- Monkey Punch
- Dennis O'Neil
- Gary Owens
- Richard Rockwell
- Allen Saunders
- Julius Schwartz
- Mike Sekowsky
- Bill Sienkiewicz
- Dave Sim
- Alex Toth
- Morrie Turner
- Bill Woggon

==== 1982 ====
- Bob Bindig
- Brian Bolland
- Russ Cochran
- David Cockrum
- Max Allan Collins
- Chase Craig
- Archie Goodwin
- Mike Grell
- Bruce Hamilton
- Jack Katz
- Howard Kazanjian
- Hank Ketcham
- Walter Koenig (actor)
- Richard Kyle
- Lee Marrs
- Frank Marshall
- John Pound, artist/founding member of San Diego Comic-Con
- Tony Raiola
- Leonard Starr
- Robert Williams

==== 1983 ====
- Douglas Adams (prose writer)
- Maeheah Alzmann
- Don Bluth
- Floyd Gottfredson
- Norman Maurer
- George Pérez
- Arn Saba
- Dan Spiegle
- Joe Staton
- James Van Hise
- Cat Yronwode

==== 1984 ====
- Murphy Anderson
- Román Arámbula
- Greg Bear (prose writer/founding member of San Diego Comic-Con)
- Fae (Gates) Desmond, Comic-Con Executive Director
- Stan Drake
- John Field
- Rick Hoberg
- Greg Jein
- Ollie Johnston
- Brant Parker
- Robert Shayne (actor)
- Curt Swan
- Frank Thomas
- Jim Valentino
- Al Williamson

==== 1985 ====
- Brent Anderson
- Ben Bova (book/magazine editor)
- David Brin
- Jack Cummings
- Jack Davis
- Alan Moore
- Dan O'Bannon (filmmaker)
- Tom Orzechowski
- John Rogers
- Alex Schomburg
- Walt Simonson

==== 1986 ====
- Poul Anderson (prose writer)
- Marion Zimmer Bradley (prose writer)
- Dave Gibbons
- Jean "Moebius" Giraud
- Gilbert Hernandez
- Jaime Hernandez
- Denis Kitchen
- Steve Leialoha
- Marty Nodell
- Harvey Pekar
- Mark Stadler
- Dave Stevens

==== 1987 ====
- Steve Ditko (Note: Ditko was presented the award in absentia, accepted on his behalf by Renegade Press publisher Deni Loubert, who had published Ditko's World the previous year. Ditko refused the award and returned it to Loubert saying, "Awards bleed the artist and make us compete against each other. They are the most horrible things in the world. How dare you accept this on my behalf".)
- Harlan Ellison (prose writer)
- Larry Geeck
- Ward Kimball
- Deni Loubert
- Bill Messner-Loebs
- Mike Peters
- Bill Schanes
- Steve Schanes
- Robert Silverberg (prose writer)
- Art Spiegelman
- Bernie Wrightson
- Ray Zone (3-D historian)

==== 1988 ====
- Robert Asprin (prose writer)
- Mike Baron
- Lynda Barry
- John Bolton
- Jules Feiffer
- Raymond Feist (prose writer)
- Matt Groening
- Gary Groth
- George R. R. Martin (prose writer)
- Mike Pasqua (Comic Con Executive Vice President)
- Steve Rude
- Marie Severin
- Matt Wagner

==== 1989 ====
- Richard Alf (founding member of San Diego Comic-Con)
- R. Crumb
- Howard Cruse
- Kevin Eastman
- Lee Falk
- Ron Goulart (prose writer)
- Walt Kelly
- Peter Laird
- Syd Mead (industrial designer)
- Andre Norton (prose writer)
- Jerry Robinson
- Diana Schutz
- Janet Tait
- Ron Turner
- Gahan Wilson

=== 1990s ===
==== 1990 ====
- Karen Berger
- Bob Burden
- Tom DeFalco
- William Gaines
- Jim Henson (puppeteer)
- Randy and Jean-Marc Lofficier
- Grant Morrison
- Bob Overstreet
- Mary Reynante
- Bob Schreck
- Ken Steacy
- Rick Sternbach (film / television illustrator)
- Charles Vess

==== 1991 ====
- Alicia Austin
- Clive Barker (prose writer)
- Dan Barry
- Dan DeCarlo
- Creig Flessel
- Neil Gaiman
- Ted "Dr. Seuss" Geisel
- Keith Giffen
- George Gladir
- Joe Haldeman (prose novelist)
- Lynn Johnston
- Carol Kalish
- Don Maitz
- Sheldon Moldoff
- Steve Oliff
- Julie Roloff
- Stan Sakai

==== 1992 ====
- Carina Burns-Chenelle, Comic-Con treasurer
- Bob Chapman
- Francis Ford Coppola (filmmaker)
- Robin Donlan
- Creig Flessel
- Alan Grant
- Bill Griffith
- Ray Harryhausen (filmmaker)
- Marc Hempel
- Jim Lee
- Scott McCloud
- Todd McFarlane
- Rowena Morrill (book/magazine illustrator)
- Diane Noomin
- Louise Simonson
- Dick Sprang
- Vernor Vinge (prose writer)
- Mark Wheatley

==== 1993 ====
- Jim Aparo
- Gary Carter (comics historian)
- Phil Foglio
- Robert Goodwin
- Ferd Johnson
- Don Martin
- Dave McKean
- Clydene Nee
- Paul Norris
- Paul Power
- P. Craig Russell
- Mark Schultz
- Vincent Sullivan
- Michael Whelan (artist)
- Roger Zelazny (prose writer)

==== 1994 ====
- Mike Carlin
- Paul Chadwick
- Al Feldstein
- Stan Goldberg
- Roberta Gregory
- Chad Grothkopf
- Jerry Ordway
- Bud Plant
- Mike Richardson
- John Romita, Jr.
- Richard Rowell
- Lucius Shepard (prose writer)
- Mickey Spillane (prose writer)
- J. Michael Straczynski
- Rumiko Takahashi

==== 1995 ====
- Roger Corman (filmmaker)
- Ramona Fradon
- Greg Hildebrandt (Brothers Hildebrandt)
- Tim Hildebrandt (Brothers Hildebrandt)
- Ryoichi Ikegami
- Irv Novick
- Joe Sinnott

==== 1996 ====
- Donna Barr
- Mort Drucker
- Joe Giella
- Jim Mooney
- Kurt Schaffenberger
- François Schuiten
- David Siegel (volunteer who has secured Golden/Silver Age comic book talent as guests for comic conventions)

==== 1997 ====
- Dick Ayers
- Steve Bissette
- Terry Brooks (prose writer)
- Bob Haney
- Russ Heath
- Carol Lay
- Michael Moorcock (prose writer)
- Janice Tobias
- George Tuska

==== 1998 ====
- Frank Alison, Comic-Con Director-at-Large
- John Broome
- Eddie Campbell
- Nick Cardy
- David Glanzer, Comic-Con Director of Marketing and Publicity
- Fred Guardineer
- Lorenzo Mattotti
- Paul S. Newman
- John Severin
- Joe Simon
- Naoko Takeuchi
- Mark Yturralde (filmmaker)

==== 1999 ====
- Tom Batiuk
- Chuck Cuidera
- Samuel R. Delany (prose writer)
- Arnold Drake
- Sam Glanzman
- Larry Gonick
- Irwin Hasen
- Sue Lord, Comic-Con HR/Guest Relations

=== 2000s ===
==== 2000 ====
- Will Elder
- Ric Estrada, sometimes (incorrectly) referred to as Rick Estrada
- Phoebe Gloeckner
- Beth Holley, Comic-Con VP, Exhibits
- Carmine Infantino
- Jack Kamen
- Ben Katchor
- Harry Lampert
- Bryan Talbot
- Angelo Torres
- Lewis Trondheim

==== 2001 ====
- Henry Boltinoff
- Irwin Donenfeld
- Brian and Wendy Froud
- Martin Jaquish, Comic-Con Director-at-Large
- Kaiji Kawaguchi
- Joe R. Lansdale
- Spider and Jeanne Robinson (prose writers)
- Alvin Schwartz
- Jeff Smith
- Kim Thompson

==== 2002 ====
- Eddie Ibrahim, Comic-Con Director of Programming
- Frank Jacobs
- Jason
- Bob Lubbers
- Bob Oksner
- Lew Sayre Schwartz
- Hal Sherman
- Herb Trimpe
- William Woolfolk

==== 2003 ====
- Charles Berberian
- Frank Bolle
- Sal Buscema
- John Davenport, Comic-Con Events staff
- Philippe Dupuy
- Steve Jackson (games manufacturer)
- Sid Jacobson
- Larry Lieber
- Terry Moore
- Howard Post

==== 2004 ====
- Jack Adler
- Tom Gill
- Harry Harrison (prose writer)
- Bruce Jones
- Batton Lash
- Mike Mignola
- Bill Plympton (animator)
- Frank Springer
- John Totleben
- Mark Hamill

==== 2005 ====
- Lee Ames
- Sy Barry
- Taerie Bryant, Comic-Con Fandom Services
- Bob Bolling
- Bob Fujitani
- Dexter Taylor

==== 2006 ====
- Peter S. Beagle (Outstanding Achievement in Science Fiction and Fantasy)
- Art Clokey (animator)
- Luis Dominguez
- Basil Gogos
- Everett Raymond Kinstler (former comics artist; presidential portrait painter)
- Kazuo Koike
- Bill Pittman, Comic-Con VP Operations
- Yoshihiro Tatsumi

==== 2007 ====
- Allen Bellman
- Renée French
- Gary Friedrich
- Adam Hughes
- Miriam Katin
- Mel Keefer
- Joseph Michael Linsner
- David Morrell (prose writer)
- Lily Renée Phillips
- Mike Ploog
- Mary Sturhann, Comic-Con Secretary
- Dan Vado
- Mark Verheiden
- F. Paul Wilson (prose writer)

==== 2008 ====
Official list

- Kyle Baker
- Ralph Bakshi (animator)
- Mike W. Barr
- Ed Brubaker
- Kim Deitch
- Victor Gorelick
- Al Jaffee
- Todd Klein (letterer)
- Tite Kubo
- Noel Neill (actress)
- Floyd Norman
- Al Plastino
- Jeff Watts
- Bill Willingham
- Connie Willis
- Jim Woodring

==== 2009 ====
Official list

- Mike Allred
- LaFrance Bragg
- Nick Cuti
- Dwayne McDuffie
- Stan Freberg
- Terry Gilliam
- John Kricfalusi
- John Lasseter
- Paul Levitz
- Hayao Miyazaki
- Patrick Oliphant
- Chris Oliveros
- Seth
- Barry Short
- Mike Towry
- Ramón Valdiosera
- Bob Wayne
- Phil Yeh

=== 2010s ===
==== 2010 ====
- Peter Bagge
- Brian Michael Bendis
- Berkeley Breathed
- Kurt Busiek
- Dave Dorman
- Moto Hagio
- Charlaine Harris
- Stuart Immonen
- Phil Jimenez
- Jenette Kahn
- Keith Knight
- Milo Manara
- Andy Manzi
- Larry Marder
- Tom Palmer
- Drew Struzan
- James Sturm
- Carol Tyler
- Anna-Marie Villegas
- Al Wiesner
- Nixon Pickles

==== 2011 ====
- Anina Bennett
- Jordi Bernet
- Joyce Brabner
- Chester Brown
- Seymour Chwast
- Alan Davis
- Dick DeBartolo
- Dawn Devine
- Tony DeZuniga
- Eric Drooker
- Joyce Farmer
- Tsuneo Gōda
- Paul Guinan
- John Higgins
- Jamal Igle
- Peter Kuper
- Richard A. Lupoff
- Pat Lupoff
- Steve Sansweet
- Bill Schelly
- Steven Spielberg (filmmaker)
- Frank Stack
- Jeff Walker ("genre consultant")

==== 2012 ====
- Charlie Adlard
- Bill Amend
- Alison Bechdel
- Tim Bradstreet
- Mike Carey (writer)
- Peter Coogan
- Geof Darrow
- Randy Duncan of Comics Arts Conference
- Ben Edlund
- Gary Gianni
- Larry Hama
- Peter F. Hamilton (prose writer)
- Mario Hernandez
- Klaus Janson
- Joe Jusko
- Robert Kirkman
- Erik Larsen
- Rob Liefeld
- Andy Mangels
- Rudy Nebres
- Whilce Portacio
- James Robinson
- Lou Scheimer
- Arnold Schwarzenegger (actor)
- Jim Silke
- Marc Silvestri
- Michael E. Uslan
- Trevor Von Eeden
- Mark Waid
- Thomas Yeates

==== 2013 ====
- Jon Bogdanove
- Alan Campbell
- Gerry Conway
- Denys Cowan
- Michael Davis
- Gene Deitch
- José Delbo
- Derek T. Dingle
- Paul Dini
- Ellen Forney
- Gary Frank
- Jenny Blake Isabella
- Dan Jurgens
- Sam Kieth
- Jack Larson
- Elliot S. Maggin
- Leonard Maltin (film critic)
- Jeff Mariotte
- Val Mayerik
- Dean Mullaney
- Martin Pasko
- Fred Perry
- Ruth Sanderson
- Romeo Tanghal
- Bruce Timm

==== 2014 ====
- Ray Billingsley
- June Brigman
- Mark Brooks
- Amanda Conner
- Brian Crane
- Chuck Dixon
- Jane Espenson
- Bill Finger
- Drew Friedman
- Michael T. Gilbert
- Brian Haberlin
- Willie Ito
- Kelley Jones
- Katherine Morrison
- Julie Newmar (actress)
- Graham Nolan
- Michelle Nolan
- Jimmy Palmiotti
- Benoît Peeters
- John Picacio
- Mimi Pond
- Joe Quesada
- Sam Raimi (film director)
- Don Rosa
- Brian Stelfreeze
- Burt Ward (actor)

==== 2015 ====
- Jerry Beck
- Greg Capullo
- Mike Catron
- Carlos Ezquerra
- Andrew Farago
- Dave Garcia
- Tom Grummett
- Jackson Guice
- Chip Kidd
- Steve Lieber
- Laura Martin
- Dave McCaig
- Bill Mumy (actor)
- Kevin Nowlan
- Joe Phillips
- Hilary B. Price
- Humberto Ramos
- Jimmie Robinson
- Luis Royo
- Jen Sorensen
- Richard Starkings
- Kazuki Takahashi
- Jill Thompson
- Jhonen Vasquez
- Craig Yoe

==== 2016 ====
- Jason Aaron
- Derf Backderf
- Michael Barrier (animation historian)
- Luc Besson (film director)
- Peggy Burns
- Peter David
- Jim Davis
- Tom Devlin
- Ben Dunn
- Matt Fraction
- William Gibson (novelist)
- Kieron Gillen
- Mike Judge (animator)
- Hidenori Kusaka
- Ed McGuinness
- Jamie McKelvie
- Tsutomu Nihei
- Christopher Priest
- Phil Roman (animator)
- Alex Sinclair
- John Trimble
- Satoshi Yamamoto

==== 2017 ====
- Andrew Aydin
- Alan Burnett
- Joyce Chin
- Kevin Feige
- Robin Hobb
- John Lewis
- Jeph Loeb
- Jonathan Maberry
- Glenn McCoy
- Keith Pollard
- Nate Powell
- Brian Selznick
- Eric Shanower
- R. Sikoryak
- Alex Simmons
- Gail Simone
- R. L. Stine
- Ron Wilson

==== 2018 ====
- Rafael Albuquerque
- Yoshitaka Amano
- Marc Bernardin
- Cory Doctorow
- Brian Fies
- Richard Friend
- Alex Grecian
- Deborah Harkness
- Elizabeth Hand
- Larry Houston
- Liniers
- Jason Lutes
- David W. Mack
- Nichelle Nichols
- Brian Pulido
- Randy Reynaldo
- Eric Reynolds
- Kevin Smith
- Peter Tomasi
- Shannon Wheeler

==== 2019 ====
- Craig Fellows (Vice President Operations, Board Member, Artist)
- Wendy All
- Leigh Bardugo
- Jon B. Cooke
- Mary Fleener
- Gene Ha
- Jonathan Hickman
- Arvell Jones
- Charlie Kochman
- Craig Miller
- Paco Roca
- Scott Snyder
- George Takei
- Billy Tucci
- Chris Ware
- Maryelizabeth Yturralde
- William Curtis (Department Head/Deaf and Disabled Services)

=== 2020s ===
==== 2022 ====
- Cecil Castellucci
- Ruth Clampett
- Danny Fingeroth
- Shaenon K. Garrity
- Marie Javins
- Jock
- Barbara Kesel
- Phil LaMarr
- Miriam Libicki
- Barbara Mendes
- Trino Monero
- Bill Morrison
- John J. Murakami
- Steve Niles
- Steve Saffel
- Dan Slott
- Lilah Sturges
- Hidetaka Tenjin

==== 2023 ====
- Mike Becker
- Jim Benton
- Holly Black
- J. Scott Campbell
- Janice Chiang
- Becky Cloonan
- Felicia Day
- Barbara Friedlander
- Anastasia Hunter
- Junji Ito
- Lisa Moreau
- Stephen Notley
- Robyn Reynante
- Ben Saunders
- Linda Sejic
- Stjepan Sejic
- John Semper Jr.
- Merrie Spaeth
- Raina Telgemeier
- Ben Templesmith
- Beau Smith
- David F. Walker
- Lee Weeks
- Ricardo Cate (Without Reservations)

==== 2024 ====
- Hitoshi Ariga
- Jo Duffy
- Keanu Reeves
- Kenichi Sonoda
- Mariko Tamaki
- Charles Ardai
- Barbara Brandon-Croft
- Rodney Barnes
- Steve Brown
- Liz Climo
- Craig “Spike” Decker
- Josh Glaser
- Juanjo Guarnido
- Jack C. Harris
- Joseph Illidge
- Dave Johnson
- Lee Kohse
- Rick Marschall
- Patrick McDonnell
- Don McGregor
- Eric Nakamura
- Naomi Novik
- Rick Parker
- Eric Powell
- Tim Powers
- Cecy Robinson
- Tom Sito
- Linda Sunshine

==== 2025 ====
- Kia Asamiya
- Trey Parker
- Matt Stone
- ChrisCross
- J. M. DeMatteis
- Bilquis Evely
- Emil Ferris
- Marcos Martin
- Erica Schultz
- J.G. Jones
- Terry Kavanagh

==== 2026 ====
- Ted Abenheim
- Steve Butler
- Jim Cummings
- Kelly Sue DeConnick
- Guillermo del Toro
- Javier Fernandez
- David Gerrold
- Shawn Martinbrough
- Doug Neff
- Belen Ortega
- Ryan Ottley
- Stephan Pastis
- John J Pearson
- LeUyen Pham
- Rob Reger
- Corey Rothermel
- Colin Turner
- Casper Wijngaard
- Scott Williams

== See also ==
- Alley Award
- Bill Finger Award
- Eagle Award
- Eisner Award
- Harvey Award
- Kirby Award
- National Comics Award
- Russ Manning Award
- Shazam Award
- Winsor McCay Award
