= Lee Hawkins Garby =

American novelist

- Born: Lee Hawkins; 20 February 1890; Missouri, United States
- Died: 10 May 1957
- Writing career
- Genre: Space opera
- Notable work: The Skylark of Space

Lee Hawkins Garby (1890–1957) was the co-author with Edward Elmer Smith of the 1928 serial novel The Skylark of Space, the first science fiction story in which humans left the Solar System. She was the wife of Dr. Carl DeWitt Garby, a friend of Smith's from college at the University of Idaho.

The novel was first published as a book in 1946, as The Skylark of Space: The Tale of the First Inter-Stellar Cruise (Buffalo Book Company(?)), naming Garby and Smith on the title page but Smith alone on the cover —with frontispiece by Charles Schneeman. The Library of Congress catalogs it as "by Edward E. Smith, in collaboration with Mrs. Lee Hawkins Garby"; publisher Southgate Press. A revised edition by Smith alone was published by Pyramid Books in 1958 and reissued many times. From 2007 the original by Garby and Smith has been in print again.

== Life ==
Hawkins was born in Missouri in 1890 and died 1957. She was the daughter of Jameson R. Hawkins (1849–1917) and Julia Valinda Offutt (1857–1929), and had five siblings, William, Sarah Valinda, Ellen, Mary, and Elijah.

Doctor Garby was born in Lewiston, Idaho in 1892, the son of Charles Henry Garby (born Germany) and Adelaide Laventia Strickland (born New York). He graduated from Lewiston Normal School in 1910, and was a classmate with Smith in the Class of 1914 at the University of Idaho, earning a degree in chemical engineering. In 1919, Dr. Garby worked for the Bureau of Chemistry in Washington DC. The Garbys had a daughter born in mid-1918. Garby was pregnant and gave birth to her daughter at the same time as Jeannie Smith was pregnant and gave birth to Roderick, and Dr. Smith was completing his studies and his World War I service. How this affected the completion of Skylark is unknown. Carl Garby received his PhD in chemistry in 1921 from George Washington University. Carl Dewitt Garby died in 1928, possibly due to workplace chemical poisoning. Lee Hawkins was appointed a junior clerk at the US Department of Agriculture on March 2, 1929.

The Garbys also had a son on June 7, 1920 Dr. Rodes Carl Garby, who contributed interviews regarding the writing of The Skylark of Space.

Amateur critic "Gharlane of Eddore" described his conversation with Dr. Smith on the writing of The Skylark of Space in a rec.arts.sf.written post in 1998:

Mrs. Lee Hawkins Garby's name is listed on the title page of all known hardback editions of "THE SKYLARK OF SPACE," since she co-wrote. She was not, repeat, not, "dragged in" to "spice up" the story for magazine publication. "Spice up?" It is to guffaw; both Richard Ballinger Seaton and Dorothy Vaneman were virgins when they married! ... As for the actual publication history, E. E. Smith, who was not yet a PhD at the time, began working on the yarn in the mid 1910s, but was being desultory about it due to his discomfort with the writing of love scenes and social dialog. His college buddy, Garby, had a wife with literary pretensions, who was actually pretty fair for the era; she offered to help out, and did a bunch of the writing and typing. This is why the original manuscript, completed in 1916, was listed as "by Edward E. Smith and Mrs. Lee Hawkins Garby." There was an extensive rewrite, by the original two writers, around 1919, right after EES got loose from his Army responsibilities after WW I.

Garby is acknowledged in some circles as an early female writer of science fiction, but little is known of her life and she made no known contributions to the field beyond her involvement with Skylark. The brief reference to her in Partners in Wonder: Women and the Birth of Science Fiction, 1926-1965 notes that Smith never hesitated to mention either her gender or marital status, always referring to her as Mrs. Garby.
