= Time Stream =

Time Stream or timestream may refer to:

- Timestream, a metaphorical conception of time
- Time Stream (Toshiko Akiyoshi Trio album), 1984
- Time Stream: Toshiko Plays Toshiko, a 1996 album by Toshiko Akiyoshi
- The Time Stream, a 1946 novel by John Taine
- "Time Stream", song by Casiopea from Active, 1992
