= Donald M. Grant =

American publisher (1927–2009)

- Born: April 3, 1927; Providence, Rhode Island, U.S.
- Died: August 19, 2009 (aged 82); North Port, Florida, U.S.
- Occupation: Publisher
- Known for: Founding Donald M. Grant, Publisher, Inc. and other small press publishers

Donald Metcalf Grant (April 3, 1927 – August 19, 2009) was an American book publisher. He is best known for publishing in the fantasy, horror, and science-fiction genres.

== Biography ==
Grant was born in Providence, Rhode Island in 1927 and graduated from the University of Rhode Island in 1949. Grant's interest in fantasy and science fiction started when he began reading the stories of Edgar Rice Burroughs at age 10. He married his wife Shirley in 1956 and they had two children.

Grant was involved in the founding of several science fiction and fantasy small press publishers. Aged 18, he co-founded Grant-Hadley Enterprises in 1945, which became the Buffalo Book Company in 1946 with the addition of Ken Krueger.

Aged 22, Grant founded Grandon, Publishers in 1949 along with James J. Donahue. The name was that of a lead character in one of Otis Adelbert Kline's fantasy novels. He formed Donald M. Grant, Publisher, Inc. in 1964.

Centaur Press was co-founded with Charles M. Collins in the late 1960s. The publishing house lasted until 1981. It was primarily a paperback publisher, though one of its more successful titles was reissued in hardcover. It was notable for reviving pulp adventure and fantasy works of the early twentieth century for its "Time-Lost Series." Centaur's output was small, generally on the order of one to three books a year. Its publications featured thicker and less acidic paper than that utilized by most paperback houses.

Authors whose works were returned to print by Centaur Press include Robert E. Howard, Alfred H. Bill, Jean d'Esme, and William Hope Hodgson. In the sole anthology it issued, the press also premiered a couple new works, one by Darrel Crombie and one by contemporary author Lin Carter. In later years it also published longer works by contemporary authors, including Carter, Galad Elflandsson, and Robb Walsh.

Covers were created by artists such as Jeff Jones, Frank Brunner, David Ireland, and David Wenzel.

Grant died August 19, 2009 in North Port, Florida.

== Awards ==
- 1976, World Fantasy Special Award: Professional
- 1979, Balrog Awards: professional achievement
- 1980, World Fantasy Special Award: Professional
- 1983, World Fantasy Special Award: Professional
- 1984, World Fantasy Convention Award
- 2003, World Fantasy Award for Life Achievement.

== Bibliography ==
- Act of Providence, with Joseph Payne Brennan (Donald M. Grant, Publisher, 1979)

=== As editor ===
- "333": A Bibliography of the Science-Fantasy Novel, by Joseph H. Crawford, Jr. (The Grandon Company, 1953)
- Rhode Island on Lovecraft, with Thomas P. Hadley (Grant-Hadley Enterprises, 1945)
- Swordsmen and Supermen, edited anonymously (Centaur Press, 1971)
- Virgil Finlay, (Donald M. Grant, 1971)
- Talbot Mundy:Messenger of Destiny (Donald M. Grant, 1983)
