= Greg Preston =

American photographer and writer (born 1960)

- Born: Gregory Mark Preston; June 2, 1960 (age 66)
- Occupations: Photographer, writer
- Notable work: The Artist Within
- Spouse: Sharon Sampsel (m. 1986)
- Website: sampselpreston.com

Gregory Mark Preston (born June 2, 1960) is an American photographer and writer, known for his portraiture of artists within their creative spaces.

== Early life and education ==
Preston was first exposed to comic books at age eight and was immediately drawn to the visuals. At age thirteen, Preston was reintroduced to comics by a friend and from that point on he was hooked.

For college, Preston enrolled at the University of Nevada, Las Vegas, for his first two years as a fine arts major, thinking he wanted to be an illustrator, but really his desire was to be comic book artist. An instructor's advice that Preston seek out a more serious art school with commercial sensibilities, led him to enroll in a community college for graphic design.

Preston bought his first camera, an Olympus OM-1, during that third year of studies, to shoot reference photos for his illustrations, and found his passion.

After graduating with a degree in graphic design, Preston then moved to Los Angeles to study photography at the Art Center College of Design. In school, Preston began shooting with Nikon and Hasselblad cameras; and his favorite photographer influences were Richard Avedon, Irving Penn, Albert Watson, Mark Seliger, and Andrew Eccles.

Preston met Sharon Sampsel at the Art Center, graduating in 1986, and the couple married the same year.

== Career ==
Preston would go on to find work as commercial advertising photographer, specializing in hotel, resort, hospitality, weddings, portrait, editorial, food, and architectural photography. Preston and his wife opened their Las Vegas-based photography studio, Sampsel Preston Photography, on April 1, 1988.

Preston's love of the illustration and fantasy art – and a suggestion from cartoonist Scott Shaw – brought about the idea for Preston's project of portraits of artists within their studios. The fifteen-year-long project brought together 101 cartoonists, comic book artists, and animators into an award-winning book of black-and-white portraits whose subjects include Frank Miller, Al Hirschfeld, Joe Barbera, Jack Kirby, Joe Simon, Moebius, Walt and Louise Simonson. The Artist Within: Portraits of Cartoonists, Comic Book Artists, Animators and Others (ISBN 978-1593075613) was published by Dark Horse Books in 2007.

After the success of his first book, Preston crowdfunded the companion book. Launched in March 2017, the Kickstarter campaign received funding of $30,624. The Artist Within: Behind the Lines: Book 2 (ISBN 978-0692917565) was published in November 2017, and features both black-and-white and color portraits of more than one hundred artists, including Drew Struzan, Jack Kirby, Mark English, Keith Knight, Syd Mead, Steranko, Ron English, Glen Keane.

Preston's portraits from The Artist Within project have been seen during the Academy Awards and the Eisner Awards. Preston's The Artist Within portrait of artist Marie Severin was used by publications including The Atlantic, The Washington Post, and Newsday to announce her death.

In past years, Preston has also been the official portrait photographer at events, including Spectrum Fantastic Art Live in Kansas City; and CTN Animation Expo in Burbank, California; setting up a pop-up studio to take portraits of the guest artists in attendance.

Preston has been an invited speaker at various venues. In 2011, he was a guest speaker the Society of Wedding and Portrait Photographers convention in London, to speak about being a hotel and resort photographer. He has also spoken about his The Artist Within project before audiences at the CTN Animation Expo, Loyola Marymount University, and at the Art Center College of Design.

== Bibliography ==
- 2007 The Artist Within: Portraits of Cartoonists, Comic Book Artists, Animators and Others ISBN 978-1593075613
- 2017 The Artist Within: Behind the Lines: Book 2 ISBN 978-0692917565
