= Skylark (series) =

Science fiction/space opera book series

Skylark is a science fiction/space opera series by American writer E. E. Smith. In the first book, The Skylark of Space (first published in Amazing Stories in 1928), a scientist discovers/accidentally invents a space-drive, builds a starship, and flies off with three companions to encounter alien civilizations and fight a larger-than-life villain.

The Skylark of Space was the first of a series which continued through three subsequent books—Skylark Three and Skylark of Valeron written during the 1930s, and Skylark DuQuesne, written in the mid 1960s. Smith initially intended the series to end with an Epilogue to Skylark Three set 1,467 generations later, which was meant to ‘end the “Skylark” stories definitely, purposely’; but ‘if there are enough more [requests], I will try again. There are several ways of getting away from that epilogue.’ Skylark DuQuesne was written at the request of Frederik Pohl, who later said one of his proudest achievements was "coaxing Doc into writing Skylark Duquesne".

R. D. Mullen declared that "The great success of the stories was surely due first of all to the skill with which Smith mixed elements of the spy thriller and the western story (our hero is the fastest gun in space, our villain the second fastest) with those of the traditional cosmic voyage."

== Summary ==
The entire series describes the conflicts between protagonists Seaton and Crane, and antagonist DuQuesne, which often break into open warfare. It also includes depictions of progressively increasing scales of conflict (equalled by progressively-increased technology) between themselves, individually and collectively, and a series of non-humans bent on universal conquest. When forced to cooperate against an alien species which had conquered one galaxy and was expanding into others, the characters conclude that the universe is large enough to allow peace.

== Novels ==
- The Skylark of Space (written 1915–1921, serialized 1928, published in book form 1946)
- Skylark Three (serialized 1930, published in book form 1948)
- Skylark of Valeron (serialized 1934, published in book form 1949)
- Skylark DuQuesne (serialized 1965, published in book form 1966)

== Popular Culture ==
- The series influenced the design of the early video game Spacewar!
- The 2019 album All Aboard the Skylark by Hawkwind may be named after either these novels or the catchphrase call of 'All aboard the SkylArk' in the cartoon series 'Noah and Nelly.'
