= Skylark Three =

1930 novel by Edward Elmer Smith

- Dust-jacket from the first edition
- Author: Edward E. Smith, Ph.D.
- Illustrator: A. J. Donnell
- Cover artist: A. J. Donnell
- Language: English
- Series: Skylark
- Genre: Science fiction
- Publisher: Fantasy Press
- Publication date: 1948
- Publication place: United States
- Media type: Print (Hardback)
- Pages: 246
- ISBN: 0-515-03160-7
- OCLC: 1225926
- Preceded by: The Skylark of Space
- Followed by: Skylark of Valeron

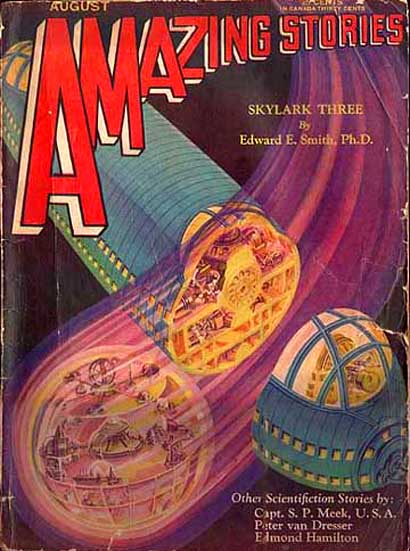
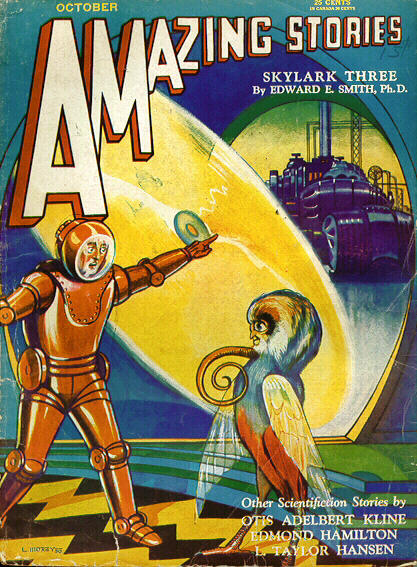
Skylark Three was serialized in Amazing Stories in 1930, with cover illustrations by Wesso and by Leo Morey

Skylark Three is a science fiction novel by American writer E. E. Smith, the second in his Skylark series. Originally serialized through the Amazing Stories magazine in 1930, it was first collected in book form in 1948 by Fantasy Press.

== Plot synopsis ==
Skylark Three (1930) is the second book in the Skylark series and is set a year after the events of The Skylark of Space, during which year antagonist Marc "Blackie" DuQuesne has used the wealth obtained in the previous book to buy a controlling interest in the story's 'World Steel Corporation', a large company known for its ruthless attitude. When the story begins DuQuesne announces a long absence from Earth, to find another species more knowledgeable than the Osnomians allied with protagonist Richard Seaton. Shortly thereafter, DuQuesne and a henchman disappear from Earth. DuQuesne, by now aware of the 'Object Compass' trained on him, travels far enough to break the connection, then turns toward the 'Green System' of which Osnome is a part. Seaton discovers this, but is distracted by attempts to master a "zone of force": essentially a spherical, immaterial shield, with whose present form Seaton is dissatisfied for its opacity and impenetrability even by the user.

Seaton is then requested by his allies Dunark and Sitar, the crown prince and prince's consort of Osnome, to repel invasion by the natives of planet 'Urvan', Osnome's neighbor; whereupon Seaton and his millionaire sponsor, Martin Crane, accompanied by their wives and Crane's valet Shiro embark in the spaceship Skylark II to obtain the necessary minerals. Near the Green System, they are attacked by the hitherto-unseen natives of the planet 'Fenachrone', whose weaponry surpasses any known to Seaton or the Osnomians. Having used the 'zone of force' at first to conceal himself, and then to destroy the Fenachrone battleship, Seaton captures a leading crew-member, who reveals (upon interrogation) that the Fenachrone intend conquest of the entire Milky Way Galaxy, and eventually of the Universe, and that a message is already in progress toward the Fenachrone capital to summon aid. Discovering that Dunark and Sitar survived the destruction of their spaceship, the Skylark II tows the remnants of both vehicles to Osnome, where Seaton forces a peace treaty between Osnome and Urvan. Meanwhile, DuQuesne and his aide have also interrogated a Fenachrone and plan to capture an entire Fenachrone battleship for personal use.

Hoping to master the "zone of force", Seaton, Crane, and their wives travel from planet to planet of the 'Green System', in search of those already skilled in its use. Initially they encounter the Dasorians, an amphibious species of humanoid, who direct them to the Norlaminians, who possess full control of both matter and energy. A much larger successor ship, the Skylark Three, is built and equipped on planet Norlamin, where Seaton at first explores the Fenachrone's world, then orders the Fenachrone to abandon their conquest. Upon their refusal, Seaton remotely destroys their reconnaissance spaceships, and then goes on to a full-fledged genocide, destroying their home planet and killing all the Fenachrone except an escaped colony ship led by one of their leading scientists. Equipped with a Fenachrone spaceship, DuQuesne also survives, but leads Seaton and the Fenachrone to presume his death. Increasing his technology still further by powering his new ship with uranium instead of copper, Seaton pursues and destroys the Fenachrone colony ship; but does not discover DuQuesne.

=== Selected Variorum ===
- The original text begins with an Author’s Note beginning “To all profound thinkers in the realms of Science who may chance to read Skylark Three, greetings: I have taken certain liberties with several more or less commonly accepted theories, but I assure you that those theories have not been violated altogether in ignorance.” This debate continues in an exchange of letters between Smith and his future editor, John W. Campbell Jr.
- The explanations of the rays of the third, fourth, and fifth orders vary significantly:

when sub-electrons were identified the rays given off by their combination into electrons, or by the disruption of electrons, were called rays of the third order.… Continuing farther, particles of the fourth order give rays of the fourth order; those of the fifth, rays of the fifth order. Fourth-order rays have been investigated quite thoroughly, but only mathematically and theoretically,…Very little is known, even in theory, of the rays of the fifth order, although they have been shown to exist.

when sub-electrons of the first and second levels were identified, the energies given off by their combinations or disruptions were called rays of the third and fourth orders.… I know practically nothing of the fifth—the first sub-ethereal level

- The original version ends with an Epilogue set 1,467 generations later, which Dr Smith wrote in a letter to the editor was meant to ‘end the “Skylark” stories definitely, purposely’; but ‘if there are enough more [requests], I will try again. There are several ways of getting away from that epilogue.’

== Reception ==
P. Schuyler Miller reviewed the novel favorably, saying in Smith's hands space operatics "took on new freedom and stature".

Arthur C. Clarke was a fan; the only space battle scene he wrote, in Earthlight, was a specific homage to the attack on the Mardonalian fortress in chapter seven of Skylark Three.

== Sources ==
- Brown, Charles N.; William G. Contento. "The Locus Index to Science Fiction (1984-1998)".
- Chalker, Jack L.; Mark Owings (1998). The Science-Fantasy Publishers: A Bibliographic History, 1923-1998. Westminster, MD and Baltimore: Mirage Press, Ltd. p. 236.
- Tuck, Donald H. (1978). The Encyclopedia of Science Fiction and Fantasy. Chicago: Advent. p. 398. ISBN 0-911682-22-8.
