= The Weapon Shop =

- Short story by A. E. van Vogt
- Country: USA
- Language: English
- Genre: Science fiction

Publication
- Published in: Astounding Science Fiction
- Media type: Print (Magazine)
- Publication date: 1942

"The Weapon Shop" is a science fiction short story by Canadian writer A. E. van Vogt, originally published in the December 1942 issue of Astounding Science Fiction. It was developed from a much shorter 1941 story, "The Seesaw". It was, in turn, used as the basis for a portion of the 1951 fix-up novel The Weapon Shops of Isher.

It was among the stories selected in 1970 by the Science Fiction and Fantasy Writers of America as one of the best science fiction short stories published before the creation of the Nebula Award in 1965. As such, it was published in The Science Fiction Hall of Fame, Volume One, 1929–1964.

== The Seesaw ==
A shop selling "The Finest Energy Weapons in the Known Universe" mysteriously appears in Middle City in June 1947. A reporter, Chris McAllister, enters the shop and suddenly finds himself 7,000 years in the future. The shop's owner and daughter conclude that this was caused by a weapon being turned on the shop by their enemies, the House of Isher.

The owner calls several of his friends to the shop and hatches a plan to counteract the weapon. McAllister now holds an enormous temporal charge. If he leaves the shop he will return to his time, while the weapon will be shot into the future by the same amount. As he dresses in a protective suit that retains the charge, he realizes there is a problem — unless he removes the suit, he will retain the charge, and the motion will not stop. The group seizes him and throws him out the door.

He finds himself back in 1947, but after a short time, is propelled into the future again, and then back and forth as if on a seesaw. He notices that each swing is further than the last, and eventually realizes his ultimate duty is to remove the suit at the beginning of time, causing the Big Bang.

== The Weapon Shop ==
A small businessman named Fara faces mounting professional and personal troubles despite his fierce devotion to the Empress who rules the Solar System. He is infuriated when a weapons shop, which sells fantastic technology but which is not controlled by the Empress, materializes in his town. He fails in his efforts to have the shop expelled, and is soon further humiliated and impoverished when his son participates in a scam against him.

Nobody is willing to help him except, surprisingly, the operators of the weapons shop. Fara discovers that the size and power of their organization far surpass his initial understanding, and that they represent a bulwark against the otherwise absolute power of the Empress. Although most of the villagers follow the Empress through blind authority, the Weapon Shop has been secretly working in order to protect their rights and freedom. They offer him evidence that organizations owned by the Empress herself organized the theft of his money and store. The weapons shop organization restores his stolen property, and he quietly joins their resistance to the state.
