= Grant-Hadley Enterprises =

Defunct American specialty small press

Grant-Hadley Enterprises was the first of three names used by an American small press publishing house specializing in science fiction titles. The company was founded in 1945 by Donald M. Grant (then aged 18) and Thomas G. Hadley and published one title as Grant-Hadley Enterprises. Kenneth J. Krueger joined the company in 1946 and the name was changed to The Buffalo Book Company. Later in 1946, Hadley continued the company on his own as The Hadley Publishing Co.

== Grant-Hadley Enterprises ==
Donald M. Grant first met Thomas G. Hadley at Dana's Old Corner Bookstore in Providence, Rhode Island in 1945. The bookstore had recently acquired the library of fellow Providence native, H. P. Lovecraft, from his estate. Grant and Hadley wanted to see if there was anything of interest. In the course of the chance meeting, they struck up a conversation about Lovecraft and decided that there should be a volume of memoirs by Providence natives who had known Lovecraft. They ended up publishing Rhode Island on Lovecraft which was successful enough to warrant a second edition.

=== Works published by Grant-Hadley Enterprises ===
- Rhode Island on Lovecraft, edited by Donald M. Grant and Thomas G. Hadley (1945) (Two printings, one in green wrappers dated 1945, printed in Maryland; the other (re-set) in brown wrappers designated 2nd printing Dec 1945, printed in Cranston, RI). Publisher's name appears only as Grant-Hadley. Both printings were illustrated by Betty (or Betsy) Wells Halladay (illustrations of objects owned by H. P. Lovecraft and the John Hay Library); the placement of illustrations was rearranged in the second printing. Halladay was a schoolgirl of 15 years of age at the time, attending Hope Street High School.

Betty Wells Halladay later provided the cover art for several Hadley Publishing Co volumes (see below) including John W. Campbell's The Mightiest Machine (1947), and for Final Blackout by L. Ron Hubbard (1948). Her father Allan Wells Halladay provided cover art for the Hadley Publishing Co edition of E.E. Smith's Skylark of Space (1947 ed) (see below).

== The Buffalo Book Company ==
Kenneth J. Krueger, a science fiction fan and book seller from Buffalo, New York, was drafted in 1945 and eventually stationed near Providence. Krueger joined the venture bringing with him a mailing list from his book selling business. At this point, Donald Grant had also entered the military and was stationed in Texas. Krueger talked Tom Hadley into changing the name of the publisher to The Buffalo Book Company. The first book published by The Buffalo Book Company was The Time Stream, by John Taine. According to Jack Chalker, the book did not sell well which delayed their second publication of The Skylark of Space by E. E. Smith. On the other hand, Robert Weinberg states that: "While neither book was particularly well put together or packaged, they sold well, especially the Smith title.

=== Works published by The Buffalo Book Company ===
- The Time Stream, by John Taine (1946)
- The Skylark of Space by E. E. Smith (1946). This title had originally been proposed as a book by William F. Crawford back in 1935.

== The Hadley Publishing Co. ==
Lloyd Arthur Eshbach ordered a copy of Skylark of Space from The Buffalo Book Company, in 1945 or 1946. Frustrated by the publishing delays, Eshbach wrote to the Buffalo Book Company offering suggestions as to how they could better market their books. Thus started a correspondence between Eshbach and Tom Hadley with Eshbach continuing to offer advice. At this point Ken Krueger had moved back to Buffalo and Don Grant was attending college, though he continued to offer recommendations on what to publish. Hadley decided to continue the company on his own, renaming it The Hadley Publishing Co. According to Robert Weinberg, "making things even more complicated, Hadley and Grant later published a third edition of The Skylark of Space under the banner of FFF: Publishers. All of the Hadley volumes used ugly typefaces and were illustrated by barely competent fan artists. They reflected an enthusiasm for publishing but a lack of knowledge about the basics of the publishing business."

=== Works published by The Hadley Publishing Co. ===
- The Weapon Makers, by A. E. van Vogt (1946). Cover art by [unknown].
- The Mightiest Machine, by John W. Campbell, Jr. (1947). Cover art by Betty Wells Halladay.
- The Skylark of Space by E. E. Smith (1947), reset from The Buffalo Book Company edition Cover art for this edition by Alan Halladay.
- Final Blackout, by L. Ron Hubbard (1948) Cover art by Betty Mays Halladay.
