= The Weapon Makers =

1952 novel by A.E. van Vogt

- 1952 edition
- Author: A. E. van Vogt
- Language: English
- Genre: Science fiction
- Publisher: The Hadley Publishing Co., Greenberg (revised ed.)
- Publication date: 1947, 1952 (revised ed.)
- Publication place: United States
- Media type: Print (Hardback)
- Pages: 224
- OCLC: 2153412

The Weapon Makers is a science fiction novel by American writer A. E. van Vogt.

The novel was originally serialized in Astounding Science Fiction from February to April 1943. The serial version was first published in book form in 1947 with a print run of 1,000 copies. It was then thoroughly revised in 1952. All subsequent printings contain the 1952 text.

The events in the novel take place approximately seven years after the events described in The Weapon Shops of Isher (1951) even though the serial was published before some of the other Isher stories contained in The Weapon Shops of Isher. The first paperback edition, part of an Ace Double, was retitled One Against Eternity.

== Reception ==
Groff Conklin described the 1952 edition as "a fascinating book... despite its bombast and its blithe impossibilities." Boucher and McComas described the novel as "a grand fantasy-melodrama," although they questioned "whether its noble imaginative adventure has anything to do with science fiction." P. Schuyler Miller reviewed the novel favorably, describing it as "less pretentious and possibly less profound than the "Null-A" books."

== Publication history ==
- 1947 — USA, Providence, R.I.: The Hadley Publishing Co., 224p. (the text of the original 1943 magazine serial)
- 1952 — USA, Greenberg, 220p. (revised version, subsequent printings use this text)
- 1954 — UK, Weidenfeld & Nicolson, 224p. (first UK edition)
- 1955 — USA, Ace Double, as One Against Eternity
- 1967 — Japan, Tokyo sogensha, 288p.
- 1970 — UK, London: New English Library, 141p.
- 2016 — Japan, Tokyo Sogensha, 330p.(revised version,)
