= Richard Alf =

American businessman

- Born: January 26, 1952; United States
- Died: January 4, 2012 (aged 59); United States
- Education: San Diego State University; University of California, San Diego
- Occupation: Comic Book Retailer
- Parent: Martha Alf (mother)
- Writing career
- Notable awards: Inkpot Award (1989)

Richard Alf (January 26, 1952 – January 4, 2012) was an American businessman and former comic book store owner who co-founded San Diego Comic-Con, and served as its chairman beginning in 1970. In 1970, Alf provided the initial funding for the first convention, then known as San Diego's Golden State Comic-Con.

== Biography ==
=== Personal life ===
Alf was born to artist Martha Alf and Edward F. Alf Jr., a psychology professor at San Diego State University from 1963 until 1988. Alf was known for his height, as he stood 6-foot-6. He attended Kearny High School in San Diego. Alf studied music at the University of California, San Diego.

=== San Diego Comic-Con ===
In 1970, Alf teamed with a group of other comic enthusiasts, including Shel Dorf, Mike Towry, and Ken Krueger, to establish the first Comic-Con annual convention, then known as the San Diego's Golden State Comic-Con.

Shel Dorf, who was 35 years old at the time, had conceived the idea for a comic convention, but lacked money and transportation to create the event. Alf, a then 17-year-old senior at Kearny High School, provided Dorf with both the money and transport, in the form of Alf's 1954 Volkswagen Beetle. Alf donated several thousand dollars to fund the convention for its first three years. He would be paid back after the convention.

The first convention, known San Diego's Golden State Comic-Con, which was held at the U.S. Grant Hotel in downtown San Diego in 1970, was co-chaired by Alf. Alf became the chairman of the convention in 1971, while he was a music student at the University of California, San Diego. He used his ties to the university to move the convention to campus in 1971, offering discounted dorm rooms as housing for attendees. The dorm idea proved less than successful, as the university placed attendees on the same floors as quiet study groups, such as the Montessori. In 1972, Alf and Mike Towry co-chaired the third annual Comic-Con at the El Cortez in San Diego.

The convention, now known as San Diego Comic-Con, is now an internationally known, four-day annual event held at the San Diego Convention Center. From its small beginnings, Comic-Con now attracts more than 125,000 attendees, with contributions from major celebrities and film studios.

Alf largely gave up his unpaid, volunteer positions at Comic-Con later in the 1970s. During the mid-1970s, he opened his own comic book store, called Comic Kingdom, in the University Heights (now Hillcrest) community of San Diego. In 1979, he sold the comic business (to Chuck Rozanski of Mile High Comics) and pursued careers in commodity trading and outdoor advertising.

In 2009, Comic-Con honored Alf, Dorf, Krueger, Towry and other co-founders of the convention. In November 2009, Dorf died in San Diego and Krueger died in upstate New York in the same month. Alf contributed to a special project by San Diego State University's library to document the early years and founders of Comic-Con with primary sources.

Alf was diagnosed with pancreatic cancer in December 2011 after collapsing at his home in Serra Mesa, San Diego. He spent a short time at La Jolla Nursing and Rehabilitation Center before being transferred to the home of his friend, Earl Bookhammer, in Ramona, California. He died at Bookhammer's home in Ramona on January 5, 2012, at the age of 59.
