= Martha Alf =

American artist (1930–2019)

- Born: Martha Joanne Alf; August 13, 1930; Berkeley, California, United States
- Died: September 13, 2019 (aged 89); Santa Monica, California, U.S.
- Education: Bachelor of Arts in psychology from San Diego State University 1952. Master of Arts in art from San Diego State University in 1963. Master of Fine Arts in painting from University of California at Los Angeles 1970
- Known for: painting, drawing, photography, writing
- Spouse: Edward Franklin Alf Jr. (m. 1951)
- Children: Richard Alf
- Website: https://www.marthaalffoundation.com

Martha Joanne Alf (August 13, 1930 – September 13, 2019) was an American artist. Her work consists of paintings, drawings and photographs of everyday objects, including pears and rolls of toilet paper.

== Personal life ==
Alf was born August 13, 1930, in Berkeley California. She is the only child of Foster Wise Powell and Julia Vivian Kane. Her father was an attorney and her mother worked as a legal secretary often for her husband. When Martha was 2 years old her family moved to Winterset, Iowa, to live with her grandparents. In 1938 the family moved to San Diego, California, where her father started work at a law firm. Martha grew up in La Mesa, California, where she attended Grossmont High School, where she studied art. At San Diego State University she met her future husband, Edward Franklin Alf Jr. In 1951, they wed, before Edward was drafted for service in Korea. The couple had one child Richard in 1952.

== Education ==
At San Diego State University Alf studied painting with Everett Gee Jackson. She then studied painting at the University of California at Los Angeles under Richard Diebenkorn.

== Paintings and drawings ==
Alf first became recognized as a nationally significant artist for her 1970s "cylinder paintings," each of which depicts a toilet paper roll positioned like a monument on an empty stage. Three of these paintings were selected by curator Marcia Tucker for the "1975 Biennial of Contemporary Art" at the Whitney Museum of American Art. Alf painted many of the cylinder paintings in unorthodox colors that express a range of emotions. She approached the series as Josef Albers had in his "Homage to the Square" series, by repeating a constant image from painting to painting, but varying the colors.

In the late 1970s Alf turned to making graphite drawings of fruits and vegetables which she arranged like actors on a stage, acting out psychodramas. The most frequent subject of choice was the pear which, when shown alone, was at times considered by the artist to be a self-portrait. In 1978, Alf earned national recognition for her unique drawing technique. In a review for Arts Magazine, art critic David S. Rubin wrote that Alf's "still life arrangements rendered mostly by soft, delicate, diagonally hatched pencil strokes, sparkled with radiant light while also saturating us with a gripping textural sensuality. Alf draws with a controlled and steady hand. She has been keenly attentive to every nuance of surface and value and shows enormous reverence for the integrity and expressive potential of the drawing medium".

Alf shifted from black and white to color in her pastel drawings of the early 1980s. Continuing to draw staged fruits, with the pear being the dominant subject, Alf exaggerated color and light to the point that the drawings assumed a spiritual dimension. In "Pear #1 (For Andy Wilf)," 1982, a solitary pear serves as a surrogate for a young artist friend who had recently died an untimely drug-related death. The stem of the pear in the drawing is shown as if reaching towards golden light, suggesting that Alf's tormented friend had at last found peace with the universe at large.

Alf returned to painting in the late 1980s, producing a series of painted depictions of pears rendered in colors so bright and intense that an art critic referred to them as "psychedelic pears" Three of them are included in the book Psychedelic: Optical and Visionary Art since the 1960s by David S. Rubin. As in her earlier cylinder paintings, the imagery remains constant from painting to painting, while colors vary. In the 1990s, Alf focused on a single color in a series of monochromatic red paintings with subtle patterning and variations in texture.

== Photography ==
In the 21st century, Alf has concentrated almost exclusively on photography, which she practiced for many years alongside painting and drawing. Concurrent with the 1970s cylinder paintings, Alf made photographs of toilet paper rolls as a means of studying color. Before photographing an unused roll, the artist dyed it using colored markers. She subsequently made photos of other subjects, including her familiar fruits and vegetables. In 1998, Alf began making photographs of pigeons roosting on a window sill opposite her home. She fed them to keep them coming, named each pigeon, created narratives for them, and produced a video featuring the pigeons, entitled "Birdland".

Around the same time, Alf began photographing still life arrangements of unusual objects that she had collected over the years. In "New Glass City." 2002, Alf responded to the events of September 11, 2001, by creating a visual metaphor for a new metropolis, which she did by photographing an arrangement of several glass objects that glisten as they reflect sunlight.

== Awards ==
- 1979 Kay Nielsen Memorial Purchase Award, Graphic Arts Council, County Museum of Art, Los Angeles.
- 1979 National Endowment for the Arts Individual Artist Grant.
- 1989 National Endowment for the Arts Individual Artist Grant.
- 1996 Richard Florsheim Art Fund Award.

== Selected solo exhibitions ==
- 2012 – Martha Alf Retrospective Exhibit – Santa Monica College Performing Arts Center – October 30 – December 1, 2012

== Notable collections ==
- Red and Black #2, 1975, Orange County Museum of Art, Newport Beach, California
- Two Bosque Pears, 1986, Metropolitan Museum of Art, New York, New York
- Various works, Portland Art Museum, Portland, Oregon
