= Skylark of Valeron =

1934 novel by Edward Elmer Smith

- Dust-jacket from the first edition
- Author: Edward E. Smith, Ph.D.
- Illustrator: A. J. Donnell
- Cover artist: A. J. Donnell
- Language: English
- Series: Skylark
- Genre: Science fiction
- Publisher: Fantasy Press
- Publication date: 1949
- Publication place: United States
- Media type: Print (Hardback)
- Pages: 252
- ISBN: 0-515-03022-8
- OCLC: 1104978
- Preceded by: Skylark Three
- Followed by: Skylark DuQuesne

Skylark of Valeron is a science fiction novel by the American writer E. E. Smith, the third in his Skylark series. Originally serialized in the magazine Astounding in 1934, it was first collected in book form in 1949 by Fantasy Press.

== Plot summary ==
The story continued from the last scenes of battle in Skylark Three.

Having pursued and destroyed the fleeing Fenachrone colony spaceship, The Skylarkers decided to explore the galaxy seen up ahead, to take the opportunity offered by the great velocity resulted from the chase and the distance they had traveled. Along the way, Seaton discovered thought is a phenomenon of the "sixth order", and developed the technologies in relation with it.

Meanwhile, DuQuesne's ruse faking death (see Skylark Three) fooled all the Fenachronians, the Skylarkers and the Norlaminians. He successfully deceived the Norlaminians into giving him everything the Norlaminians had given Seaton, eluded their watchful eyes, returned to Earth and quickly become the complete master of it by the super-technologies he now possessed.

At the other corner of the galaxy, Seaton was experimenting with his thought-sixth order projector. He attracted the attention of the Disembodied Intellectuals (in The Skylark of Space). The leader of the Disembodied Intellectuals, "One", wanted to appropriate Seaton's mind for his "experiments". Seaton naturally refused. This situation escalated into a fight. The Uranium metal store of the Skylark Three - used for powering offense and defense - was no match for the inexhaustible cosmic energy at the command of the Disembodied Intellectuals. Running out of power and having no other choice, Seaton decided to try the heretofore one-way trip: a rotation into the "Fourth Dimension" in the small Skylark Two.

After an eventful interval in the strange Fourth Dimension, the Skylarkers returned to normal space far removed from where they were. They had escaped the clutch of the Disembodied Intellectual, but were utterly lost. Their small Skylark Two was insufficient for their needs. They had to find resources and help to build their technologies back up, to find the way, and be able to get home. They ran across the so-human-like Valeronians, who were in the mortal struggle with the hypnotic, amoeba-like, shape-shifting Chlorans, and helped them to win the war.

With the help of the Valeronians and their resources, Seaton built the new Skylark of Valeron, far far larger than prior Skylarks at 1000 km in size. With a "mechanical brain" a.k.a. a super-computer "running on all bands of the 'sixth order'", a "Sixth Order Projector" that could reach almost anywhere, he mapped the First (known) Universe, and found the way home. With the help of the Norlaminians, Seaton managed to trap and imprison the Disembodied Intellectuals, and liberated Earth from DuQuesne's dictatorship. He sent the seven Disembodied Intellectuals - and DuQuesne as the eighth member - away on a one-way (he believed) long, long trip, and ushering in a new era for the humanity of Earth.

== Reception ==
The Astounding reviewer, P. Schuyler Miller, received the novel favorably, saying the Skylark stories "had a simple reasonableness about them which made their advent a milestone in science fiction".

== Literary significance ==
The book and series is referred to as "famous" in a number of reviews of Science fiction.

== Sources ==
- Chalker, Jack L.; Mark Owings (1998). The Science-Fantasy Publishers: A Bibliographic History, 1923-1998. Westminster, MD and Baltimore: Mirage Press, Ltd. p. 236.
- Tuck, Donald H. (1978). The Encyclopedia of Science Fiction and Fantasy. Chicago: Advent. p. 398. ISBN 0-911682-22-8.
