= The Weapon Shops of Isher =

1951 novel by A.E. van Vogt

- Dust jacket of the first edition
- Author: A. E. van Vogt
- Language: English
- Genre: Science fiction
- Publisher: Greenberg
- Publication date: 1951
- Publication place: United States
- Media type: Print (Hardcover)
- Pages: 231
- OCLC: 1626099

The Weapon Shops of Isher is a science fiction novel by American writer A. E. van Vogt, first published in 1951. The novel is a fix-up created from three previously published short stories about the Weapon Shops and Isher civilization:

- "The Seesaw" (Astounding, July 1941)
- "The Weapon Shop" (Astounding, December 1942)
- "The Weapon Shops of Isher" (Wonder Stories, February 1949)

== Overview ==
The Weapon Shops of Isher and its sequel The Weapon Makers detail the workings of Isher civilization and the adventures of Robert Hedrock, The One Immortal Man, as he keeps it in balance in the face of attempts by the Weapon Makers, who have forgotten their purpose as a permanent opposition, and the strong government of the Empress, Innelda Isher, with its intimate connections to a network of financial institutions, to undermine each other. The Weapon Shops provide the populace with defensive weapons and an alternative legal system.

The Isher/Weapon Shops novels are rare examples of Golden Age science fiction that explicitly discuss the right to keep and bear arms, specifically guns. Indeed, the motto of the Weapon Shops, repeated several times, is "The right to buy weapons is the right to be free".

The political philosophy of the Weapon Shops is minimalist. They will not interfere with the corrupt imperial monarchy of the Isher government, because men always have a government of the type they deserve: no government, however bad, exists without at least the tacit consent of the governed. The mission of the Weapon Shops, therefore, is primarily to provide a mechanism to prevent an unjust government from oppressing the people too much. Van Vogt says, “[The idea of the founder of the Weapon Shops] was nothing less than that whatever government was in power should not be overthrown. But that an organization should be set up which would have one principal purpose—to ensure that no government ever again obtained complete power over its people. . . . What counts is that many millions of people have the knowledge that they can go to a weapon shop if they want to protect themselves and their families. And, even more important, the forces that would normally try to enslave them are restrained by the conviction that it is dangerous to press people too far. And so a great balance has been struck between those who govern and those who are governed.”

The novel was published by Greenberg in New York in 1951. It was also published as a paperback by Ace Books and in 1969 by New English Library in the U.K.

== Reception ==
Boucher and McComas praised Weapon Shops as "a fine excitingly involved melodrama.". P. Schuyler Miller reviewed the novel favorably, reporting that "It will take agile wits to know just what is happening, or why, at any given time." New York Times reviewer Basil Davenport found the opening segment "begins well enough," but as the novel progresses, the reader's attention becomes "badly divided."

== In popular culture ==
- The Weapon Shop slogan, "The right to buy weapons is the right to be free", is often approvingly cited by supporters of the National Rifle Association and other advocates for gun rights.
- The Market Anarchist Center for a Stateless Society has referred to WikiLeaks as "Our Weapon Shop of Isher".
- The fictional government think tank created by Stephen King in his novel Firestarter is colloquially known as The Shop. It is stated that this is a direct reference to the Van Vogt novel.

== Publication history ==
- 1966: JAPAN, Tokyo Sogensha, 286pp.
- 2016: JAPAN, Tokyo Sogensha, 334pp.(revised version)
