= The Artist Within =

The Artist Within: Portraits of Cartoonists, Comic Book Artists, Animators and Others
- Author: Greg Preston
- Language: English
- Publisher: Dark Horse Books
- Publication date: July 31, 2007
- Publication place: United States
- Pages: 216
- ISBN: 9781593075613

The Artist Within: Portraits of Cartoonists, Comic Book Artists, Animators and Others is a coffee table book consisting of a photographic series of portraits of popular culture artists within their creative studio workspaces, by American photographer and author Greg Preston.

== Background ==
The Artist Within was first conceived when photographer Greg Preston's love of illustration and fantasy art and a suggestion from cartoonist Scott Shaw! fermented into Preston's project of photographing artists within their studios. The 15 year long project brought together over 200 influential cartoonists, comic book artists, animators, and other fantasy illustrators into hard-bound book collection of black and white portraits of artists in their studios. Some of those featured include: Will Eisner, Carl Barks, Frank Miller, Al Hirschfeld, Chuck Jones, Joseph Barbera, Jack Kirby, Joe Simon, Moebius, Cathy Guisewite, Berke Breathed, R. Crumb, the Hernandez brothers, Alex Ross, Todd McFarlane, Walt and Louise Simonson, among many more.

== Publication and release ==
The Artist Within: Portraits of Cartoonists, Comic Book Artists, Animators and Others was published by Dark Horse Books on July 31, 2007. A companion book The Artist Within: Behind the Lines: Book 2 ISBN 978-0692917565 was published in 2017.

== Reception ==
Portraits from The Artist Within project have been seen during the Academy Awards and Eisner Awards. Preston's The Artist Within portrait of artist Marie Severin was used by publications such as The Atlantic, The Washington Post, and NewsDay to announce her death.
