= Mike Towry =

American businessman

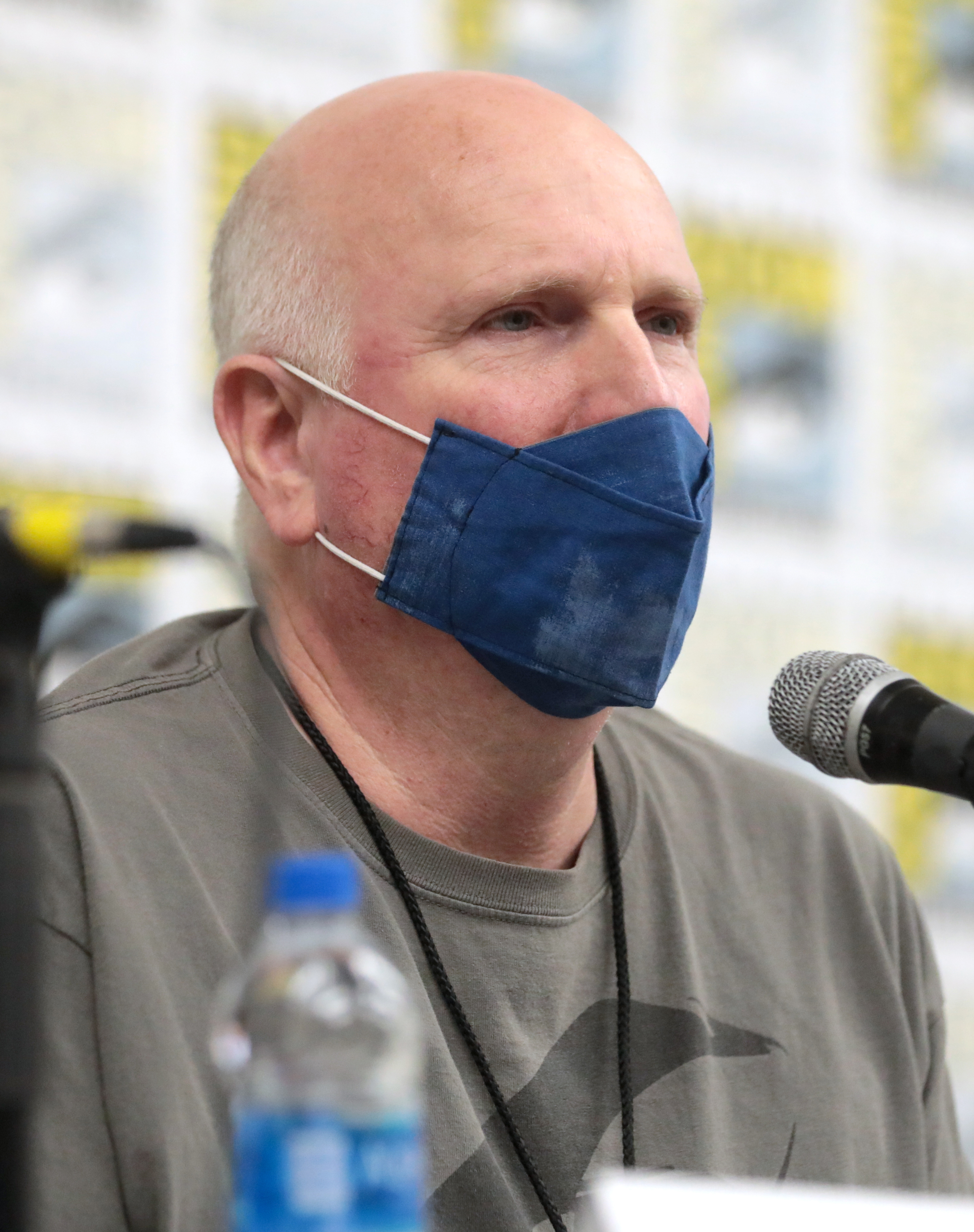
- Towry at the 2021 San Diego Comic-Con
- Born: United States
- Occupation(s): Businessman, San Diego Comic-Con co-founder

Mike Towry is an American co-founder of San Diego Comic-Con. Towry established the annual convention, then called "San Diego's Golden State Comic Book Convention," in 1970 with a group of friends, including Richard Alf, Shel Dorf and Ken Krueger. Towry served as an early co-chairman of the convention.

In 2009, Towry and the other founders were honored for their contributions by San Diego Comic-Con.
