= Skylark DuQuesne =

1965 novel by Edward Elmer Smith

- Cover of first paperback edition
- Author: E. E. Smith
- Cover artist: Jack Gaughan
- Language: English
- Series: Skylark
- Genre: Science fiction
- Publisher: Pyramid Books
- Publication date: 1966
- Publication place: United States
- Media type: Print (Paperback)
- Pages: 238
- Preceded by: Skylark of Valeron

Skylark DuQuesne is a science fiction novel by American writer E. E. Smith, the final novel in his Skylark series. Written as Smith's last novel in 1965 and published shortly before his death, it expands on the characterizations of the earlier novels (written 1919 - about 1938) with some discrepancies (some of which may relate to unwritten background developments). Marc DuQuesne, the major villain of the three previous novels, is shown to have matured, reformed, and been offered a chance at what amounts to a pardon for his prior crimes against the heroes.

The book ends with Dick Seaton and DuQuesne teaming up to perpetrate a galaxy-wide genocide against the Chlorans, causing all their suns to go nova. This act is condoned with the argument that otherwise the Chlorans would have eventually broken out of their galaxy and taken over the entire universe; Seaton compares the Chlorans to a cancer which must be destroyed "to the last cell". The Chlorans themselves, though depicted earlier in the book as extremely cruel, were not bent on exterminating humans but only enslaving and exploiting them.

Skylark DuQuesne was first serialized in IF Worlds of Science Fiction beginning in June 1965 before being published in 1966 by Pyramid Books. The novel was nominated for the Hugo Award for Best Novel in 1966.

== Sources ==
- Tuck, Donald H. (1978). The Encyclopedia of Science Fiction and Fantasy. Chicago: Advent. p. 398. ISBN 0-911682-22-8.
