= Charles Schneeman =

American illustrator (1912–1972)

- Born: November 24, 1912; Staten Island, New York, U.S.
- Died: January 1, 1972 (aged 59); Pasadena, California, U.S.
- Occupation: Illustrator
- Spouse: Betty J. Myers
- Children: Three

Charles Schneeman (November 24, 1912, in Staten Island, New York – January 1, 1972, in Pasadena, California) was an American illustrator of science fiction.

== Life ==
Schneeman was born in the Staten Island borough of New York City.

In 1922, his family moved from his birthplace to the Brooklyn borough where he graduated from Erasmus Hall High School in 1928. He received a degree in art from the Pratt Institute in Brooklyn in 1933. Further art training followed at Grand Central School of Art with Harvey Dunn and George Bridgman's figure drawing classes. Afterwards, Schneeman noted that his training consisted of “endless work. . .in sketch groups and subways and everywhere.”

By the end of his formal training, Schneeman was already interested in science fiction. "A friend showed me an early copy of Amazing Stories in 1927 and it was my undoing. The world lost a chemist as I went down the science fiction drain", he wrote. During his years at Pratt, Schneeman helped pay his tuition by executing sketches for Greenback’s Science and Invention.

He also contributed illustrations to Wonder Stories, which he started drawing for in 1934 and moved to Astounding Science Fiction in 1935.

From 1935 to 1941, Schneeman was one of the more frequent contributors of illustrations for Astounding Stories and Astounding Science Fiction (two names for the present-day magazine named Analog Science Fiction and Fact). In 1938, he had his first cover, for "The Legion of Time" by Jack Williamson, and at that time he met John W. Campbell.

In 1940, Schneeman was drafted into the Army Air Corps and was stationed at Lowry Field in Denver, Colorado. He continued to develop his graphic skills and interest in new technologies as an illustrator for U.S. Army Air Corps technical manuals and discussed doing a comic strip with Isaac Asimov. During this period, he also continued to produce limited science-fiction graphics for Astounding Science Fiction, although for the whole period from 1938 to 1952 he produced five covers for the magazine.

After his release from the armed services, Schneeman, with his new bride, returned to New York City briefly and worked as an illustrator for the New York Journal-American. He also provided illustrations for romance magazines and occasional works in the science-fiction genre.

Subsequently, he worked for the Denver Post and moved with his family to California in 1950 to accept a position with the Los Angeles Examiner.

Residing in Pasadena until his death in 1972, Schneeman’s works were included in street fairs, various galleries and exhibitions at the Pasadena Art Museum and the Los Angeles County Museum of Art.

== Personal life ==
Schneeman married Betty J. Myers in 1941. He was a father to Paul R. Schneeman (born 1946), Gregg E. Schneeman (born 1950), and Lynne N. Fearman (born 1954).

== Artwork ==
In addition to the science-fiction genre (1935–1963), Schneeman illustrated romance magazines, drew humorous cartoons, and created historical and scientific illustrations. Although he used a variety of media, Schneeman expressed a preference for brush and ink, using simple line or dry-brush shading.

== See also ==
- List of American artists
- List of illustrators
- List of people from Denver
- List of people from New York City
- List of people from Pasadena, California
- List of science fiction and fantasy artists
