= The Time Stream =

1931 novel by Eric Temple Bell

- Dust-jacket from the first edition
- Author: John Taine
- Cover artist: Allan Halladay
- Language: English
- Genre: Science fiction
- Publisher: The Buffalo Book Company
- Publication date: 1946
- Publication place: United States
- Media type: Print (Hardback)
- Pages: 251
- OCLC: 2390104

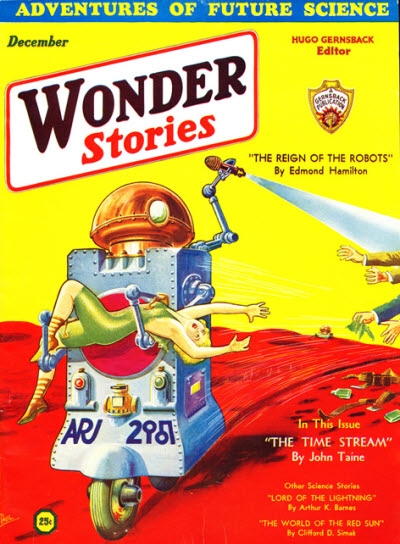
The Time Stream was serialized in Wonder Stories in 1931

The Time Stream is a science fiction novel by American writer John Taine (pseudonym of Eric Temple Bell). The novel was originally serialized in four parts in the magazine Wonder Stories beginning in December 1931. It was first published in book form in 1946 by The Buffalo Book Company in an edition of 2,000 copies of which only 500 were ever bound. It is the first novel to see time as a flowing stream.

== Plot introduction ==
The novel concerns time travel and links the world Eos at the beginning of the universe with the 1906 San Francisco earthquake.

== Reception ==
Astounding reviewer P. Schuyler Miller described The Time Stream as "the strangest of all John Taine's novels," concluding that it was "less powerful" than other Taine fiction "because he tries to do too much." Everett F. Bleiler noted that it is "generally conceded to be Taine's best novel, despite its somewhat confusing presentation and very ambivalent theme"; he concluded that the ambivalence "makes the novel interesting."

== Sources ==
- Chalker, Jack L.; Mark Owings (1998). The Science-Fantasy Publishers: A Bibliographic History, 1923-1998. Westminster, MD and Baltimore: Mirage Press, Ltd. p. 125.
- Tuck, Donald H. (1974). The Encyclopedia of Science Fiction and Fantasy. Chicago: Advent. p. 36. ISBN 0-911682-20-1.
