= Shel Dorf =

San Diego Comic-Con co-founder, comic strip letterer, artist, and writer

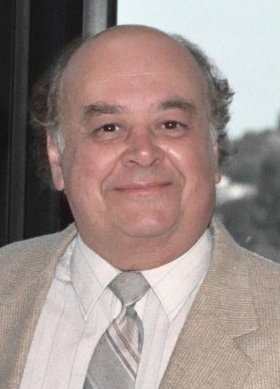
- Dorf in April 1988
- Born: Sheldon Dorf; July 5, 1933 Detroit, Michigan, U.S.
- Died: November 3, 2009 (aged 76) San Diego, California, U.S.
- Areas: comic book convention pioneer, letterer
- Notable works: San Diego Comic-Con; Steve Canyon (lettering only)
- Awards: Inkpot Award (1975)

Sheldon "Shel" Dorf (July 5, 1933 – November 3, 2009) was an American comic book enthusiast and the founder of San Diego Comic-Con. Dorf was also a freelance artist and graphic designer, who lettered the Steve Canyon comic strip for the last 12 to 14 years of the strip's run.

== Early life ==
Born in Detroit, Michigan, Dorf was a fan of comic books and comic strips, particularly Chester Gould's work on the daily strip Dick Tracy.

Dorf studied at Chicago's Art Institute before moving to New York and beginning his career as a freelancer in the field of commercial design. In the 1960s, Dorf had made the acquaintance of a number of creators working in the two fields, among them Jack Kirby, upon whom Dorf would occasionally call.

== Career ==
=== Comic-Con ===
In 1964 back in Detroit, teenager Robert Brosch organised a convention for fans of the comics medium, which Dorf and Jerry Bails, the "father of comics fandom", attended. The next year Dorf and Bails took over the event, christening it the "Detroit Triple Fan Fair" (referring to fantasy literature, fantasy films, and comic art) and organizing it as an annual event. The Detroit Triple Fan Fair (DTFF) is credited as being the first regularly held convention featuring comic books as a major component. Dorf went on to produce the DTFF in 1967 and 1968 as well.

In 1970, Dorf moved to San Diego, California, to take care of his aging parents. Almost immediately, he organized a one-day convention "as a kind of 'dry run' for the larger convention he hoped to stage," with Forrest J Ackerman as the star attraction.

Dorf's first three-day San Diego comics convention, the Golden State Comic-Con, was held at the U. S. Grant Hotel from August 1–3, 1970. It would eventually grow into San Diego Comic-Con, now considered the standard bearer for U.S. comic conventions. The convention moved in subsequent years to the El Cortez hotel; the University of California, San Diego; and Golden Hall, before settling into the San Diego Convention Center in 1991.

=== Later endeavors ===
As "'Founding Father' of San Diego Comic-Con", Dorf received an Inkpot Award at the 1975 San Diego Comic-Con.

In 1984 Dorf began compilation and editing of the Dick Tracy comic strips in comic book format for Blackthorne Publishing, "proudly" publishing ninety-nine issues and collecting the material again in twenty-four collections.

Chester Gould's daughter, Jean Gould O'Connell credits Dorf with bringing "Tracy out to another generation." Comics historian Mark Evanier said Caniff "honored Shel by making him into a character. It was a well-meaning football player named "Thud Shelley" who appeared a few times in the Canyon strip. Jack Kirby also made Shel into a character ... a father figure named Himon who appeared in Mister Miracle. In 1990, Dorf was employed as a consultant on Warren Beatty's big-screen adaptation of Dick Tracy.

Dorf would also contribute interviews to the comics press and movie collector magazines (including for The Buyer's Guide for Comic Fandom [TBG] and Film Collector's World), and his conversations with Milton Caniff and Mort Walker have both been collected in the University Press of Mississippi's Milton Caniff: Conversations and Mort Walker: Conversations respectively. His interview with Wally Wood (among the few to see print) for TBG was reprinted in Comic Book Artist #14 (July 2001).

== Death and legacy ==
Dorf died at age 76 on November 3, 2009, from diabetes-related complications in Sharp Memorial Hospital, San Diego. He was survived by his brother, Michael.

The Shel Dorf Awards were created in 2010 to honor "'the comic industry's best and brightest talents', and voted on by fans." In 2011, the Detroit Fanfare convention began presenting the awards, which were presented through 2013.
