= San Diego Comic-Con =

Multi-genre entertainment and comic convention in California, US

- Status: Active
- Genre: Multigenre
- Venue: San Diego Convention Center (main); Downtown San Diego (various)
- Locations: San Diego, California, U.S.
- Coordinates: 32°42′23″N 117°09′41″W
- Country: United States
- Inaugurated: March 21, 1970; 56 years ago (as San Diego's Golden State Comic-Minicon)
- Most recent: July 23, 2026; 3 months ago
- Next event: July 22, 2027; 8 months' time
- Attendance: >135,000 (2022)
- Organizer: San Diego Comic Convention dba Comic-Con International
- Filing status: 501(c)(3) nonprofit
- Website: comic-con.org

San Diego Comic-Con is a comic book convention and multi-genre entertainment event held annually in San Diego, California, United States, at the San Diego Convention Center. Founded in 1970, originally showcasing primarily comic books and science fiction/fantasy media, Comic-Con has grown to include a large range of pop culture and entertainment elements across virtually all genres.

According to Forbes, Comic-Con is the "largest convention of its kind in the world". Since 2010, Comic-Con has filled the San Diego Convention Center to capacity with over 130,000 attendees. Comic-Con is home to the Eisner Awards, which recognizes creative achievement in American comic books, often referred to as the comic industry's equivalent to the Academy Awards.

San Diego Comic Convention, doing business as Comic-Con International, is the corporate name of the public-benefit nonprofit corporation behind Comic-Con.

== History and organization ==
The convention was founded in 1970 by Shel Dorf, Richard Alf, Ken Krueger, Mike Towry, Ron Graf, Barry Alfonso, Bob Sourk, Scott Shaw, John Pound, Roger Freedman, David Clark, and Greg Bear. Initial comic book and sci-fi club meetings would be held at Krueger's Alert Books in Ocean Beach, where much of the foundation of the early Cons coalesced. In the mid-1960s, Dorf, a Detroit-born comics fan, organized the Detroit Triple Fan Fair, one of the first commercial comics-fan conventions in the United States. When he moved to San Diego in 1970, he organized a one-day convention known as San Diego's Golden State Comic-Minicon on March 21, 1970, "as a kind of 'dry run' for the larger convention he hoped to stage". Dorf remained associated with the convention, variously as president or manager, for years until becoming estranged from the organization. Alf co-chaired the first convention with Krueger and became chairman in 1971.

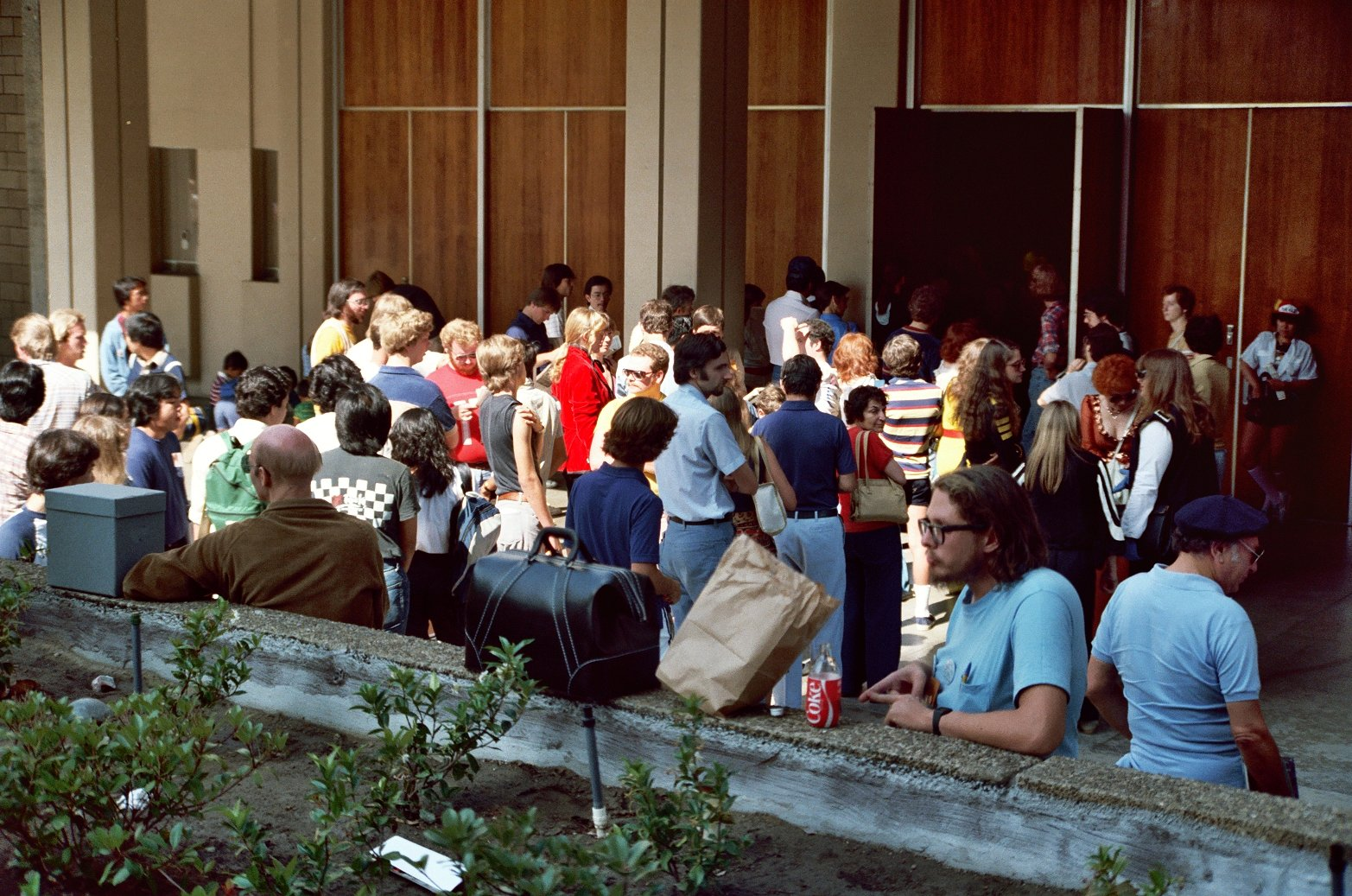
Convention crowd outside of Golden Hall in 1982

Following the initial gathering, Dorf's first three-day San Diego comic convention, San Diego Golden State Comic-Con, drew 300 people. The venue was held in the basement of the U.S. Grant Hotel, having been secured by Graf, from August 1–3, 1970. The first few Comic-Cons operated under the name San Diego West Coast Comic Convention until 1973, when it changed to San Diego Comic-Con. Other locations in the convention's early years included El Cortez Hotel, the University of California, San Diego, and Golden Hall, before being moved to the San Diego Convention Center in 1991. Richard Alf, chairman in 1971, has noted an early factor in the Con's growth was an effort "to expand the Comic-Con [organizing] committee base by networking with other fandoms such as the Society for Creative Anachronism and the Mythopoeic Society, among others. (We found a lot of talent and strength through diversity)". In a Rolling Stone article about the origins of Comic-Con, it noted the work of Krueger, who handled early business matters, and worked to get the event to be organized by a non-profit organization. By the late 1970s, the show had grown to such an extent that Bob Schreck recalled visiting with his then-boss Gary Berman of Creation Conventions and reflecting, "While [Berman] kept repeating (attempting to convince himself) 'This show's not any bigger than ours!' I was quietly walking the floor stunned and in awe of just how much bigger it really was. I was blown away." From 1984 to c. 1994, a trade fair called the "San Diego Comic Book Expo" was held in association with San Diego Comic-Con; David Scroggy was the organizer. In 1995, the convention's official name was changed to Comic-Con International: San Diego.

According to Forbes, the convention is the "largest convention of its kind in the world"; Publishers Weekly wrote "Comic-Con International: San Diego is the largest show in North America"; it is also the largest convention held in San Diego. The convention has an estimated annual regional economic impact of more than $140 million. Yet, in 2009, the estimated economic impact was criticized for allegedly negatively impacting seasonal businesses outside of Comic-Con, low individual spending estimates of attendees, that a large number of attendees live in San Diego, and that the impact of the convention was more cultural than financial.

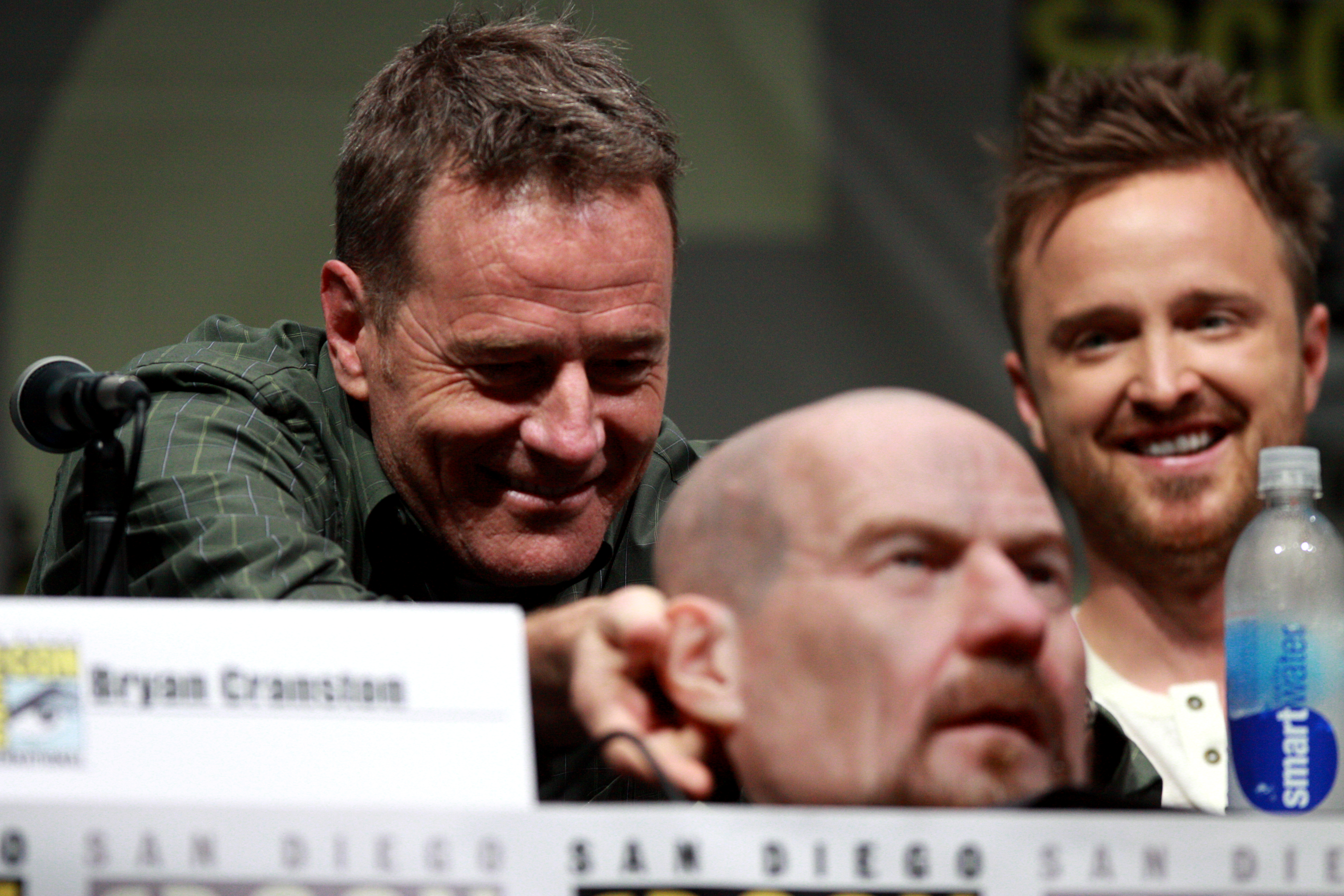
Bryan Cranston & Aaron Paul at the 2013 Comic-Con International, with Cranston holding his realistic Walter White mask.

The estimated economic impact of that year's convention was $180 million. In 2014, the estimated impact of that year's convention was $177.8 million. In 2016, the estimated impact of that year's convention was down to $150 million. By 2018, San Diego Comic-Con saw increasing competition from other comic conventions in places such as New York City, and Washington, D.C., which caused it to compete for attendees and companies time and budget; yet San Diego Comic-Con was described by Publishers Weekly as "a must-do".

The convention is organized by a panel of 13 board members, 16 to 20 full-time and part-time workers, and 80 volunteers who assist via committees. Comic-Con International is a non-profit organization, and proceeds of the event go to funding it, as well as SAM: Storytelling Across Media and WonderCon. The convention logo was designed by Richard Bruning and Josh Beatman in 1995. In 2015, working with Lionsgate, a video channel was created to host Comic-Con-related content. In 2015, through a limited liability company, Comic-Con International purchased three buildings in Barrio Logan. In 2018 Comic-Con International purchased a 29,000-square-foot (2,700 m^{2}) office in San Diego's Little Italy neighborhood.

In 2017, the organization acquired a lease to the Federal Building in Balboa Park, originally built for the California Pacific International Exposition and previously occupied by the San Diego Hall of Champions, with the intention of opening the Comic-Con Museum. By October 2017, the organization began to hire staff for the museum. Nearly a year after acquiring the lease, the museum was not yet open. During the 2018 Comic-Con, one reason stated for why the museum had not yet opened was the need for additional funds. Organizers are hoping to raise $25 million with a target opening date of late 2020 or 2022.

On April 17, 2020, the 53rd convention was cancelled due to the COVID-19 pandemic in California and two stay-at-home orders issued by California governor Gavin Newsom. An "SDCC@Home" digital streaming event was held during the same time period as a replacement for the 2020 event.

Although plans were made for the convention to possibly return in 2021 (with 2020 badge holders given the option to receive a full refund or to roll over their badge to 2021), it was announced on March 1, 2021, that the convention would be cancelled once again. Despite the availability of COVID-19 vaccines, the organizers assessed that it was still premature and unsafe to hold an in-person event at Comic-Con's full scale on the originally-scheduled dates, and that Comic-Con International was exploring the possibility of holding a smaller in-person spin-off event later in the year. SDCC@Home would again be held, but in a downsized form. A smaller in-person event, "San Diego Comic-Con Special Edition" was hosted in November 2021, with proof of full COVID-19 vaccination or a recent negative test required for admission, and face masks being mandatory. The full-scale convention returned in July 2022; once again, face masks and proof of full COVID-19 vaccination was required.

On July 13, 2023, SAG-AFTRA approved a strike after failing to renew its contract with the Alliance of Motion Picture and Television Producers (AMPTP), marking the first time that both actors and writers have concurrently been on strike since 1960. As SAG-AFTRA members would be prohibited from participating in promotional work such as panels, multiple major media companies preemptively pulled out of Comic-Con as early as June, including Disney (including subsidiaries Marvel and Lucasfilm), Netflix, Inc., Sony Pictures, and Universal Pictures. Nonetheless, the convention occurred as scheduled with, as later reported, approximately 135,000 attendees and an economic impact of $161.1 million.

Illegal building wraps on and around Petco Park in during Comic-Con 2024.

In July 2024, San Diego Police Chief Scott Wahl cited Comic-Con as an exigent circumstance allowing him to bypass a recently enacted privacy law and fast-track the installation of "smart streetlights" and automated license plate readers in the vicinity of the convention. Wahl was unaware of any specific threats but said, "That could change at any moment." In December 2024, a lawsuit was filed against the SDPD for improperly deploying the surveillance systems at Comic-Con and at the San Diego Pride Parade without disclosing their locations or the nature of the "exigent circumstances" in violation of the law.

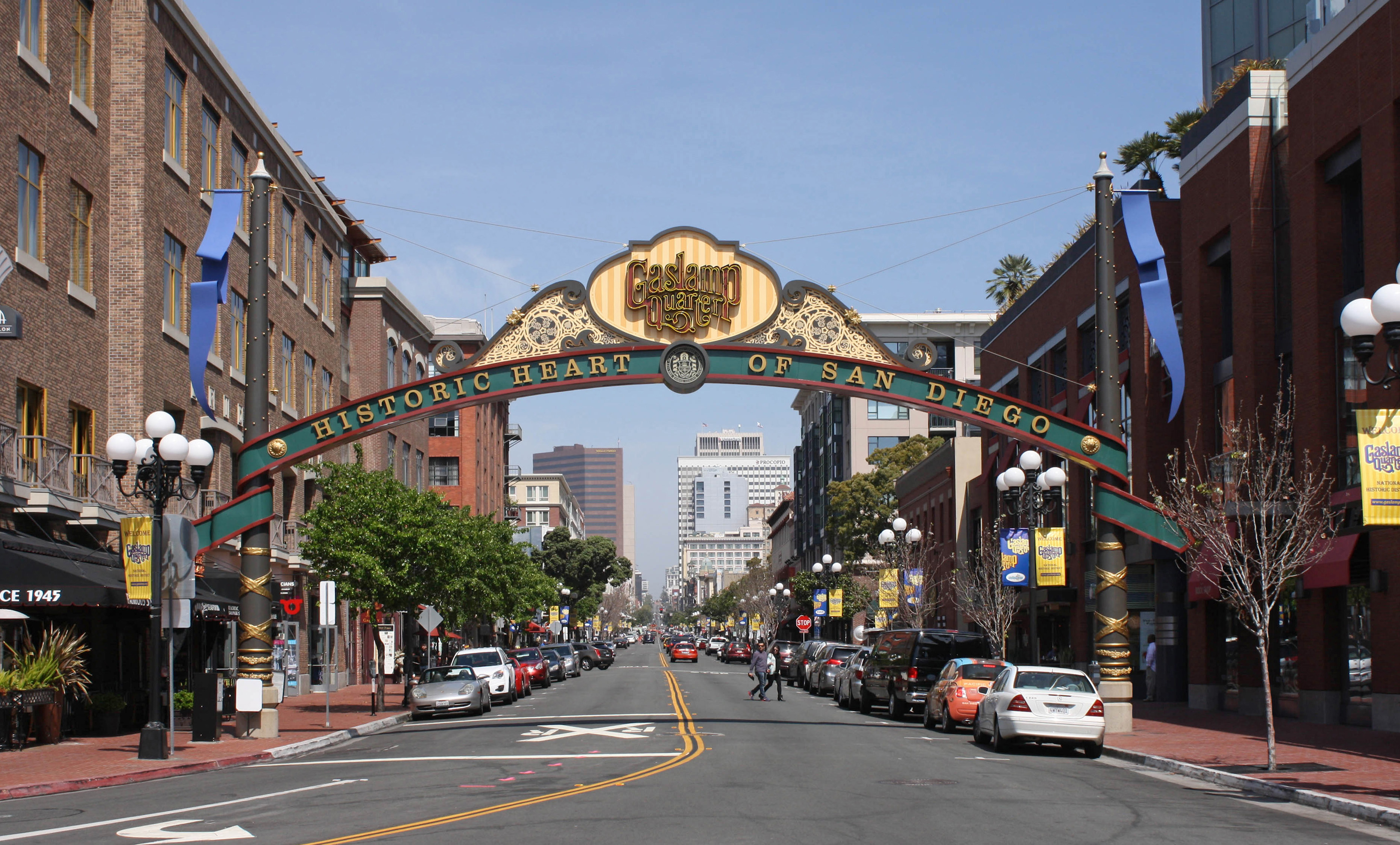
Gas Lamp Quarter signage in San Diego, California

In 2026, San Diego officials from the Housing and Community Development office issued a $160,000 fine to an advertising agency after they built an advertisement for Avengers: Doomsday that covered the Gaslamp Quarter marquee on Fifth venue. San Diego officials are threatening to cut ties with the Gaslamp due to asking Big Outdoor and the Gaslamp district to not put up the signage but proceed anyways. Wrap advertising on buildings has been illegal for years, but Comic Con has been violating the law and paying the $10,000 fines anyway. The fines surrounding the Gaslamp Quarter sign are considered an escalation.

== Events ==
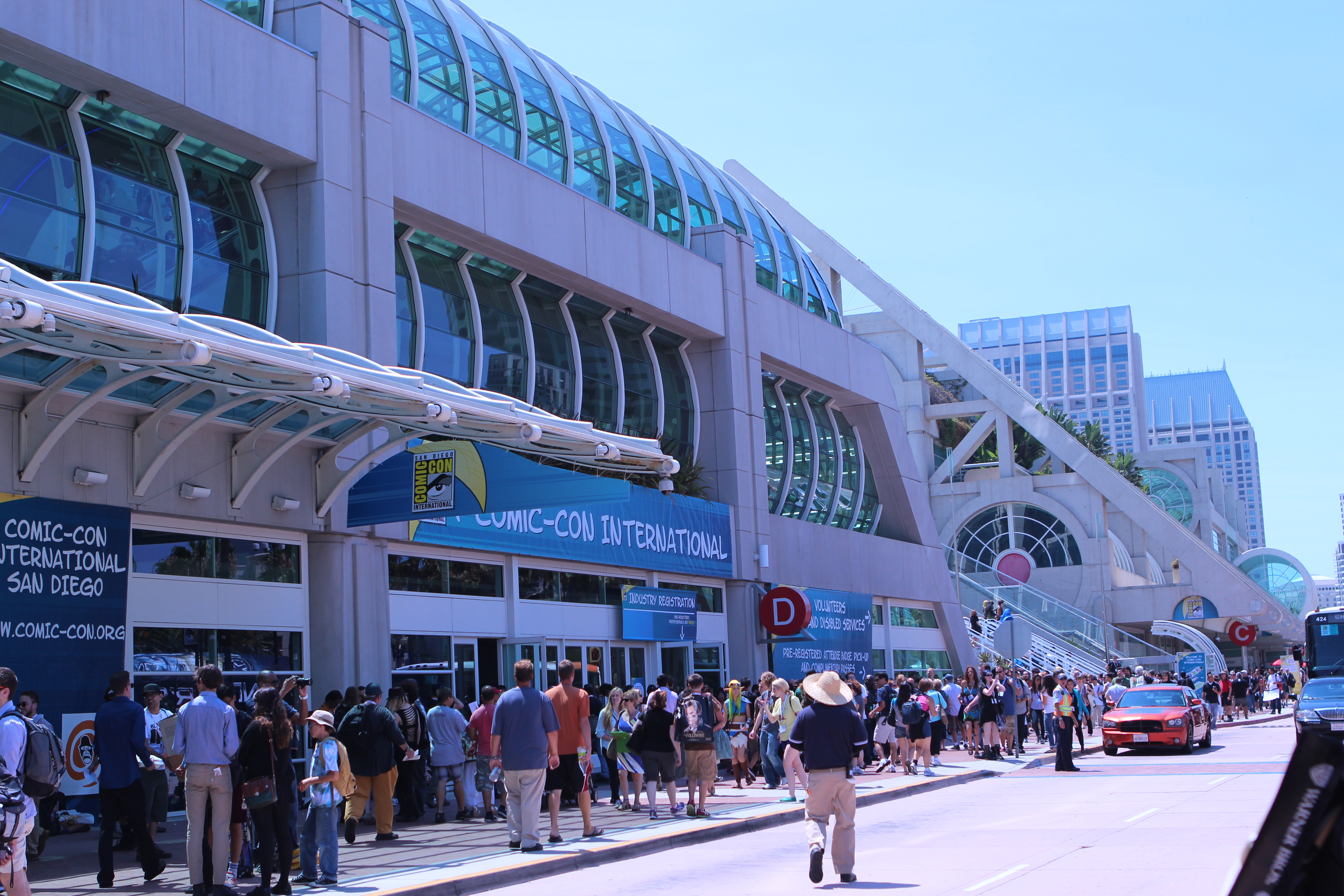
The San Diego Convention Center during Comic-Con in 2013

On the Wednesday evening prior to the official opening, professionals, exhibitors, and pre-registered guests for all four days can attend a pre-event, dubbed "Preview Night", to give attendees the opportunity to walk the exhibit hall and see what will be available during the convention.

Along with panels, seminars, and workshops with comic book professionals, there are previews of upcoming feature films and portfolio review sessions with top comic book and video game companies. The evenings include events such as awards ceremonies, the annual Masquerade costume contest, and the Comic-Con International Independent Film Festival, which showcases shorts and feature-length movies that do not have distribution or distribution deals.

Traditional events include an eclectic film program, screening rooms devoted to Japanese animation, gaming, programs such as cartoonist Scott Shaw!'s "Oddball Comics" slide show, Quick Draw! hosted by Mark Evanier with Shaw!, Sergio Aragones and a guest cartoonist responding to improvisational prompts and games (a la Whose Line Is It Anyway?), and animation expert Jerry Beck's program featuring TV's "worst cartoons ever", as well as over 350 hours of other programming on all aspects of comic books and pop culture.

Like most comic book conventions, Comic-Con features a large floorspace for exhibitors. These include media companies such as movie studios and TV networks, as well as comic-book dealers and collectibles merchants. And like most comics conventions, Comic-Con includes an autograph area, as well as the Artists' Alley where comics artists can sign autographs and sell or do free sketches. Despite the name, artists' alleys can include writers and even models.

Academics and comic industry professionals annually hold the Comics Arts Conference at Comic-Con, presenting scholarly studies on comics as a medium.

In recent years, the number of television shows that are promoted far outnumber films. During the 2011 convention, at least 80 TV shows were represented, compared to about 35 films. The shows not only promote in the exhibit halls, but also use screenings and panels of various actors, writers, producers, and others from their shows.

Premium cable channels HBO and Showtime have used the con to promote programs like Game of Thrones (HBO), Dexter (Showtime), Shameless (Showtime) and True Blood (HBO). Streaming services, including Netflix and Amazon Prime Video, have also had an increased presence at Comic-Con since the late-2010s.

In 2013, there were 1075 total panels held during the convention, the plurality of which were anime-focused (29%), followed by comic-focused panels (26%). The 2013 convention had 1036 vendors.

There are at least 17 separate rooms in the convention center used for panels and screenings, ranging in size from 280 seats to 6,100 seats. The two biggest are Ballroom 20, which seats approximately 4,900; and Hall H, which seats just over 6,100.

The neighboring Hilton Bayfront is also used, with its main ballroom (Indigo) seating up to 2,600. The other neighboring hotel, the Marriott Marquis & Marina, also hosts a lot of Comic-Con activity. Among other things, the hotel serves as the anime headquarters and is where the nighttime films are shown.

== Locations and dates ==
No.	Dates	Location	Attendance	Guests	Notes
1	March 21, 1970	U.S. Grant Hotel	60–75	Forrest J Ackerman, Mike Royer	Minicon staged to raise funding for August convention
2	Aug 1–3, 1970	U.S. Grant Hotel	300	Forrest J Ackerman, Ray Bradbury, Jack Kirby, Bob Stevens, A. E. van Vogt	a.k.a. Golden State Comic Con
3	Aug 6–8, 1971	Muir College, University of California, San Diego, La Jolla, California	800	Kirk Alyn, Leigh Brackett, Ray Bradbury, Edmund Hamilton, Jack Kirby	
4	Aug 18–21, 1972	El Cortez Hotel	900+	Bob Clampett, Harry Harrison, Jack Kirby, Katherine Kurtz, Mel Lazarus, Roy Thomas, Milt Gray	a.k.a. San Diego's West Coast Comic Convention
5	Aug 16–19, 1973	Sheraton Hotel, Harbor Island	1,000+	Neal Adams, D.C. Fontana, June Foray, Mike Friedrich, Carmine Infantino	Now officially San Diego Comic-Con; first five-day Comic-Con; first celebrity brunch
6	July 31 – August 5, 1974	El Cortez Hotel	2,500	Majel Barrett, Milton Caniff, Frank Capra, Chuck Jones, Walter Koenig, Russ Manning, Russell Myers, Charles M. Schulz, Larry "Seymour" Vincent	First Masquerade, emceed by June Foray
7	July 30 – August 3, 1975	El Cortez Hotel	2,450+	Robert Bloch, Will Eisner, Mark Evanier, Gil Kane, Jack Katz, Stan Lee, Dick Moores, Chuck Norris, Don Rico, Jerry Siegel, Jim Starlin, Jim Steranko, Theodore Sturgeon	Radio personality Gabriel Wisdom (dressed as Thor) emcees Maquerade, with Charlene Brinkman (akas Brinke Stevens)
8	Nov 7–9, 1975	El Cortez Hotel	1,100	Jock Mahoney, George Pal	Three-day follow-up to summer Con. Con incorporates as nonprofit.
9	July 21–25, 1976	El Cortez Hotel	3,000+	Sergio Aragonés, Mel Blanc, Milton Caniff, Rick Griffin, Dale Messick, Joe Shuster, Noel Sickles, Don Thompson, Maggie Thompson	Vaughn Bodé, scheduled to appear, dies just before Con.
10	July 20–24, 1977	El Cortez Hotel	4,000+	Carl Barks, C. C. Beck, Walter Gibson, Robert A. Heinlein, Michael Kaluta, Jack Kirby, B. Kliban, Joe Kubert, Harvey Kurtzman, Stan Lynde, Alex Niño, Trina Robbins, Bill Scott	
11	July 26–30, 1978	El Cortez Hotel	5,000	John Buscema, Howard Chaykin, Shary Flenniken, Alan Dean Foster, Gardner Fox, Steve Gerber, Burne Hogarth, Greg Jein, Bob Kane, Gray Morrow, Clarence "Ducky" Nash, Grim Natwick, Wendy Pini, Frank Thorne, Boris Vallejo George Metzger	Anime video programs introduced.
12	Aug 1–5, 1979	San Diego Convention Center, U.S. Grant Hotel	6,000	Kelly Freas, Mike Jittlov, Harvey Kurtzman, Victor Moscoso, Nestor Redondo, Marshall Rogers, John Romita Sr., Mort Walker, Len Wein, Marv Wolfman	US$12,000 in receipts stolen from home of Con's treasurer.
13	July 30 – August 3, 1980	San Diego Convention Center, U.S. Grant Hotel	5,000	John Byrne, Chris Claremont, Mike Grell, Paul Gulacy, Larry Niven, Joe Orlando, Richard Pini, Wendy Pini, Jerry Pournelle, Osamu Tezuka, Go Nagai, Monkey Punch, Ryoichi Ikegami, Adam West, Wally Wood	
14	July 23–26, 1981	El Cortez Hotel	5,000	Jerry Bails, Dave Berg, Ray Bradbury, L. B. Cole, Jim Fitzpatrick, Dick Giordano, George Clayton Johnson, Bil Keane, Julius Schwartz, Bill Sienkiewicz, Dave Sim	Gary Owens emcees Masquerade.
15	July 8–11, 1982	San Diego Convention Center, Hotel San Diego	5,000	Carl Barks, Terry Beatty, Brian Bolland, Max Allan Collins, Will Eisner, Mike Grell, Chuck Jones, Hank Ketcham, Walter Koenig, Frank Miller, Arn Saba, Leonard Starr, Ken Steacy, Robert Williams	
16	Aug 4–7, 1983	San Diego Convention Center, Hotel San Diego	5,000	Douglas Adams, Bob Clampett, Floyd Gottfredson, Harvey Kurtzman, Norman Maurer, Grim Natwick, George Pérez, Trina Robbins	First year the Con tried a theme for the souvenir programs. Arn Saba emcees Masquerade.
17	June 28 – July 1, 1984	San Diego Convention Center, Hotel San Diego	5,500	Greg Bear, Howard Chaykin, Stan Drake, Burne Hogarth, Greg Jein, Ollie Johnston, Bob Layton, Brant Parker, Marshall Rogers, Mike Royer, Robert Shayne, Dave Stevens, Curt Swan, Frank Thomas, Al Williamson	Held early due to Los Angeles Summer Olympics. Sergio Aragonés hosted Masquerade.
18	Aug 1–4, 1985	San Diego Convention Center, Hotel San Diego	6,000	Ben Bova, Jack Cummings, Jack Davis, Gil Kane, Harvey Kurtzman, Alan Moore (in his only U.S. convention appearance), Dan O'Bannon, Jerry Ordway, Alex Schomburg, Julius Schwartz, Jerry Siegel, Louise Simonson, Walt Simonson	Rick Geary toucan design adopted as official logo. Fae Desmond hired as general manager.
19	July 31 – August 3, 1986	San Diego Convention Center, Hotel San Diego	6,500	Poul Anderson, Marion Zimmer Bradley, Greg Evans, Stan Lee, Dale Messick, Frank Miller, Moebius, Mart Nodell, Harvey Pekar, Jim Valentino, Doug Wildey	
20	Aug 6–9, 1987	San Diego Convention Center, Holiday Inn	5,000	Harlan Ellison, Miguel Ferrer, Ward Kimball, B. Kliban, Françoise Mouly, Bill Mumy, Mike Peters, Robert Silverberg, Art Spiegelman, Bernie Wrightson	Debut of Convention Events Guide. Country Joe McDonald performs.
21	Aug 4–7, 1988	San Diego Convention Center, Omni Hotel	8,000	Art Adams, Robert Asprin, Jules Feiffer, Ray Feist, David Gerrold, Matt Groening, George R.R. Martin, Matt Wagner	Seduction Of The Innocent band (Bill Mumy, Steve Leialoha, Miguel Ferrer, Chris Christensen, Max Allan Collins) and anime department debut.
22	Aug 3–6, 1989	San Diego Convention Center, Omni Hotel	11,000	Paul Chadwick, Howard Cruse, Ron Goulart, Mark Hamill, Gilbert Hernandez and Jaime Hernandez, Selby Kelly, Syd Mead, Fred Rhoads, Jerry Robinson, Gahan Wilson	
23	Aug 2–5, 1990	San Diego Convention Center, Holiday Inn	13,000	Peter David, Will Eisner, Kelly Freas, Michael Kaluta, Mel Lazarus, Carl Macek, Grant Morrison, John Romita Jr., Van Williams	
24	July 4–7, 1991	San Diego Convention Center, Pan Pacific Hotel	15,000+	Clive Barker, Dan DeCarlo, Harlan Ellison, Neil Gaiman, Keith Giffen, Joe Haldeman, Lynn Johnston, Joe Kubert, Jim Lee, Don Maitz, Sheldon Moldoff, Rick Sternbach, Janny Wurts	
25	Aug 13–16, 1992	San Diego Convention Center, Double Tree Hotel	22,000	Francis Ford Coppola, Creig Flessel, Bill Griffith, Todd McFarlane, Diane Noomin, Rowena, William Shatner, Gilbert Shelton, Lewis Shiner, Mr. T, Gary Trousdale, Vernor Vinge, Kirk Wise	Con hosts Jack Kirby's 75th birthday party. Mark Evanier emcees.
26	Aug 19–22, 1993	San Diego Convention Center, Doubletree Hotel	28,000	Murphy Anderson, Jim Aparo, Peter Bagge, Dan Clowes, Nancy Collins, Paul Dini, Garth Ennis, Ferd Johnson, Rick Kirkman, Don Martin, Olivia, Dave Sim, Vin Sullivan, Michael Whelan, Robert Williams, Roger Zelazny	
27	Aug 4–7, 1994	San Diego Convention Center, Hyatt Regency	31,000	Mike Allred, David Brin, Dave Dorman, Al Feldstein, Rick Geary, Stan Goldberg, Roberta Gregory, Matt Groening, Chad Grothkopf, Lurene Haines, Dan Jurgens, Frank Miller, Leonard Nimoy, James O'Barr, Lucius Shepard, J. Michael Straczynski, Rumiko Takahashi, Jean-Claude Van Damme	
28	July 27–30, 1995	San Diego Convention Center	34,000	Scott Bakula, Clive Barker, Mike Baron, Simon Bisley, Charles Burns, Alan Davis, Ramona Fradon, Neil Gaiman, James Gurney, Greg Hildebrandt, Tim Hildebrandt, Ryoichi Ikegami, Gil Kane, Stan Lee, Rob Liefeld, Go Nagai, Irv Novick, Harvey Pekar, Stan Sakai, Joe Sinnott, Tom Sito, Jeff Smith, Andrew Vachss	Name change to Comic-Con International. Richard Bruning "eye" logo debuts.
29	July 4–7, 1996	San Diego Convention Center	36,000	Donna Barr, David Brin, Paul Chadwick, Steve Dillon, Mort Drucker, Ben Edlund, Garth Ennis, Dave Gibbons, Joe Giella, Richard Hatch, Dave McKean, Jim Mooney, Kurt Schaffenberger, François Schuiten	Due to the Republican National Convention, Con falls for second time on Independence Day.
30	July 17–20, 1997	San Diego Convention Center	40,000	Brent Anderson, Dick Ayers, Steve Bissette, Terry Brooks, Kurt Busiek, Evan Dorkin, Sarah Dyer, Steven Hughes, Peter Kuper, David Lapham, Carol Lay, Joseph Michael Linsner, Ralph McQuarrie, Linda Medley, Michael Moorcock, George Pérez, Brian Pulido, Alex Ross, R.A. Salvatore, Kevin Smith, George Tuska, Jhonen Vasquez, Paul Verhoeven, Mark Waid, Al Williamson	
31	Aug 13–16, 1998	San Diego Convention Center	42,000	John Broome, Eddie Campbell, Nick Cardy, Mark Crilley, Colleen Doran, Lorenzo Mattotti, Terry Moore, Paul S. Newman, James Robinson, Joe Simon, Paul Smith, Vin Sullivan, Naoko Takeuchi, Chris Ware, Robert Williams	
32	Aug 13–16, 1999	San Diego Convention Center	42,000	Tom Batiuk, Chuck Cuidera, Samuel R. Delany, Paul Dini, Arnold Drake, Neil Gaiman, Sam Glanzman, Larry Gonick, Irwin Hasen, Patrick McDonnell, Mike Mignola, Mark Mothersbaugh, Jerry Robinson, Art Spiegelman, Jim Steranko, Jill Thompson, Bruce Timm, Barry Windsor-Smith	
33	July 20–23, 2000	San Diego Convention Center	48,500	Kyle Baker, Will Elder, Ric Estrada, Al Feldstein, Phoebe Gloeckner, Jack Kamen, Ben Katchor, Harry Knowles, Harry Lampert, Jeph Loeb, Scott McCloud, Tim Sale, Marie Severin, Kevin Smith, Bryan Talbot, Angelo Torres, Lewis Trondheim, Al Williamson, Gahan Wilson, Janny Wurts	
34	July 19–22, 2001	San Diego Convention Center	53,000	Brian Michael Bendis, John Buscema, Michael Chabon, Frank Cho, Julie Doucet, Brian Froud, Wendy Froud, Gene Ha, Joe R. Lansdale, Russell Myers, P. Craig Russell, Kim Stanley Robinson, Spider Robinson, Alvin Schwartz, Dan Spiegle, Jhonen Vasquez, Judd Winick, Bernie Wrightson	
35	Aug 1–4, 2002	San Diego Convention Center	63,000	Dick Ayers, Mike Carey, Howard Chaykin, Peter David, Roman Dirge, Devon Grayson, Frank Jacobs, Chip Kidd, Bob Lubbers, Jason Lutes, Craig McCracken, Todd McFarlane, Tony Millionaire, Kevin Nowlan, Bob Oksner, Lew Sayre Schwartz, Eric Shanower, Hal Sherman, Herb Trimpe, George Woodbridge, William Woolfolk	
36	July 17–20, 2003	San Diego Convention Center	70,000	Brian Azzarello, Charles Berberian, Sal Buscema, Philippe Dupuy, Neil Gaiman, Jackson "Butch" Guice, Nalo Hopkinson, Steve Jackson, Geoff Johns, Larry Lieber, Carla Speed McNeil, Kevin O'Neill, Howard Post, R.A. Salvatore	
37	July 22–25, 2004	San Diego Convention Center	95,000	Jack Adler, Roger Dean, Dave Gibbons, Tom Gill, Harry Harrison, Sid Jacobson, Geoff Johns, Batton Lash, Chuck McCann, Aaron McGruder, Brad Meltzer, Mike Mignola, Rebecca Moesta, Bill Plympton, Eduardo Risso, Jean Schulz, Frank Springer, Tim Thomerson, Craig Thompson, John Totleben	Con expands into Hall H of San Diego Convention Center, occupying entire exhibit space. Movies presented at Comic-Con include Batman Begins, Disney/Pixar The Incredibles, Blade:Trinity, Harold and Kumar go to White Castle, and Sin City.
38	July 14–17, 2005	San Diego Convention Center	103,000	Lalo Alcaraz, Lee Ames, Sy Barry, Bob Bolling, Bruce Campbell, Nick Cardy, Greg Evans, Bob Fujitani, Pia Guerra, Ray Harryhausen, Phil Jimenez, Robert Jordan, David Lapham, Richard Morgan, Gary Panter, Eric Powell, Lou Scheimer, J. J. Sedelmaier, Dexter Taylor, Brian K. Vaughan, James Warren	Movies presented at Comic-Con 2005 included Serenity, King Kong, Aeon Flux, Ghost Rider and V for Vendetta.
39	July 20–23, 2006	San Diego Convention Center	123,000	Forrest J. Ackerman, Yoshitaka Amano, Sergio Aragonés, Peter S. Beagle, Brian Bolland, Ray Bradbury, Mark Buckingham, Kurt Busiek, Art Clokey, Daniel Clowes, Amanda Conner, Roger Corman, Luis Dominguez, Brian Fies, Phil Foglio, Basil Gogos, Carmine Infantino, Everett Raymond Kinstler, Robert Kirkman, James Kochalka, Walter Koenig, Kazuo Koike, Tommy Kovac, Roger Langridge, George R.R. Martin, Billy Martinez, Jonathan Matthews, Linda Medley, Brad Meltzer, Jean-Claude Mézières, Sheldon Moldoff, Jim Mooney, Jimmy Palmiotti, Christopher Paolini, George Pérez, Howard Porter, Jerry Robinson, John Romita, Andy Runton, Shag, Gail Simone, J. Michael Straczynski, Yoshihiro Tatsumi, John Wagner, Brian Walker, Greg Weisman, Scott Williams.	
40	July 26–29, 2007	San Diego Convention Center	125,000	Sergio Aragonés, Alison Bechdel, Allen Bellman, Ray Bradbury, Dan Brereton, Daryl Cagle, Cecil Castellucci, Darwyn Cooke, Guy Delisle, Paul Dini, Roman Dirge, Cory Doctorow, Ann Eisner, Warren Ellis, Mark Evanier, Renee French, Gary Friedrich, Christos N. Gage, Neil Gaiman, Rick Geary, George Gladir, Laurell K. Hamilton, Gilbert Hernandez, Jaime Hernandez, Adam Hughes, Joe Jusko, Miriam Katin, Mel Keefer, Scott Kurtz, Joseph Michael Linsner, Joe Matt, David Morrell, Karen Palinko, Mike Ploog, Paul Pope, Lily Renée, George A. Romero, Rowena, Dave Stevens, J. Michael Straczynski, Ben Templesmith, Roy Thomas, Morrie Turner, Mark Verheiden, Matt Wagner, J. H. Williams III, Kent Williams, F. Paul Wilson, Brian Wood.	Movies presented for Comic-Con 2007 included Iron Man, Hot Rod, Fantastic Four, Employee of the Month, Saw IV, Speed Racer, Halloween, The Mist, and Jumper.
41	July 24–27, 2008	San Diego Convention Center	126,000	Forrest J Ackerman, Sergio Aragonés, Kyle Baker, Ralph Bakshi, Mike W. Barr, Lynda Barry, Frank Beddor, Ray Bradbury, Steve Breen, Max Brooks, Ed Brubaker, Matt Busch, Jim Butcher, Eddie Campbell, Howard Chaykin, Kim Deitch, Mark Evanier, Al Feldstein, Hiro Mashima, Keith Giffen, Neil Googe, Victor Gorelick, Mike Grell, Paul Gulacy, Neil Patrick Harris, Joe Hill, Bryan Hitch, John Howe, Al Jaffee, Geoff Johns, J. G. Jones, Todd Klein, Dean Koontz, Tite Kubo, Verne Langdon, Jim Lee, Rutu Modan, Noel Neill, Floyd Norman, Jim Ottaviani, Mike Peters, Wendy Pini, Steve Purcell, Robert J. Sawyer, James Shoop, Jim Starlin, Joe Staton, J. Michael Straczynski, Adrian Tomine, Ethan Van Sciver, James Warren, Jeff Watts, Signe Wilkinson, Bill Willingham, Connie Willis, Jim Woodring, Bernie Wrightson, Dean Yeagle.	Movies Presented at Comic-Con 2008 included Twilight, Saw 5, The Watchmen, The Spirit, Terminator Salvation, Disney/Pixar Bolt and Up, Underworld: Rise of the Lycans and Pineapple Express.
42	July 23–26, 2009	San Diego Convention Center	126,000	Shane Acker, Michael "Doc" Allred, Kevin J. Anderson, Sergio Aragonés, Ray Bradbury, Brom, Gene Colan, Nicola Cuti, Kevin Eastman, Steve Epting, Mark Evanier, June Foray, Ramona Fradon, Hunter Freberg, Stan Freberg, Gary Gianni, Jimmy Gownley, Russ Heath, Brian Herbert, James Jean, Geoff Johns, Eric Jones, Kazu Kibuishi, Denis Kitchen, John Kricfalusi, Hope Larson, Jim Lee, Francis Manapul, Dwayne McDuffie, Doug Moench, Sheldon "Shelly" Moldoff, Fabio Moon, Patrick Oliphant, Bryan Lee O'Malley, Stephan Pastis, David Petersen, Darick Robertson, Jerry Robinson, Mike Royer, Stan Sakai, Lew Sayre Schwartz, Seth, Bill Sienkiewicz, Gail Simone, Leonard Starr, J. Michael Straczynski, Richard Thompson, Lewis Trondheim, Ramón Valdiosera Berman, Jerry Vanderstelt, Charles Vess, Landry Walker, Bill Willingham, Gene Yang, Leinil Yu. John Lasseter and Hayao Miyazaki as panelists	
43	July 22–25, 2010	San Diego Convention Center, Hilton San Diego Bayfront, and San Diego Marriott Hotel and Marina	130,000+	Neal Adams, Jason Spyda Adams, Joel Adams, Josh Adams, Sergio Aragonés, Peter Bagge, Gabrielle Bell, Brian Michael Bendis, Ray Bradbury, Émile Bravo, Berkeley Breathed, Kurt Busiek, Chris Claremont, Howard Cruse, Vanessa Davis, Felicia Day, Samuel R. Delany, Dave Dorman, Mark Evanier, Jon Favreau, Matt Fraction, Hunter Freberg, Stan Freberg, Nicholas Gurewitch, Moto Hagio, Charlaine Harris, Dusty Higgins, Tanya Huff, Kathryn Immonen, Stuart Immonen, Van Jensen, Phil Jimenez, Jenette Kahn, Keith Knight, Jim Lee, Stan Lee, Paul Levitz, Milo Manara, Larry Marder, Carla Speed McNeil, China Miéville, Dennis O'Neil, Robert M. Overstreet, Tom Palmer, Sean Phillips, Ivan Reis, Douglas E. Richards, Rick Riordan, Jerry Robinson, Steve Rude, Jeannie Schulz, J. Michael Straczynski, Drew Struzan, James Sturm, Jillian Tamaki, Doug TenNapel, C. Tyler, Ann VanderMeer, Jeff VanderMeer, Gerard Way, Al Wiesner, Michael Zulli.	
44	July 21–24, 2011	San Diego Convention Center, Hilton San Diego Bayfront, and San Diego Marriott Hotel and Marina	126,000+	Gerry Alanguilan, Sergio Aragonés, Jean Bails, Ed Benes, Anina Bennett, Jordi Bernet, Yves Bigerel, Joyce Brabner, Patricia Briggs, Chester Brown, Ernie Chan, Jo Chen, Seymour Chwast, Alan Davis, Dick DeBartolo, Tony DeZuniga, Eric Drooker, Garth Ennis, Mark Evanier, Joyce Farmer, David Finch, Dave Gibbons, Tsuneo Goda, Paul Guinan, Kim Harrison (Dawn Cook), Jonathan Hickman, John Higgins, Charlie Huston, Jamal Igle, Joëlle Jones, Sherrilyn Kenyon, Peter Kuper, Richard Kyle, Mell Lazarus, Jim Lee, Paul Levitz, David Lloyd, Patricia Lupoff, Richard A. Lupoff, Patrick McDonnell, Rebecca Moesta, Christopher Moore, Grant Morrison, Alex Niño, Ethan Nicolle, Malachai Nicolle, Anders Nilsen, Jerry Robinson, Bill Schelly, Scott Shaw, Louise Simonson, Walter Simonson, Jeff Smith, Frank Stack, Jim Steranko, Cameron Stewart, Dave Stewart, J. Michael Straczynski, Mark Tatulli, Roy Thomas, Maggie Thompson, Peter J. Tomasi, Scott Westerfeld, Ashley Wood Steven Spielberg appeared as a panelist.	
45	July 12–15, 2012	San Diego Convention Center, Hilton San Diego Bayfront, and San Diego Marriott Hotel and Marina	130,000+	Charlie Adlard, Bill Amend, Sergio Aragonés, Tom Batiuk, Kate Beaton, Alison Bechdel, Tim Bradstreet, Mike Carey, Gail Carriger, Becky Cloonan, Geof Darrow, Ben Edlund, Steve Englehart, Mark Evanier, Greg Evans, Brecht Evens, Gary Gianni, Stan Goldberg, Rob Guillory, Larry Hama, Peter F. Hamilton, Gilbert Hernandez, Jaime Hernandez, Mario Hernandez, Jennifer and Matthew Holm, Klaus Janson, N. K. Jemisin, Lynn Johnston, Joe Jusko, Karl Kerschl, Robert Kirkman, Erik Larsen, John Layman, Jim Lee, Jeff Lemire, Paul Levitz, Rob Liefeld, Andy Mangels, Rudy Nebres, Dan Piraro, Whilce Portacio, Nate Powell, James Robinson, Brandon Sanderson, Ben Saunders, Doug Savage, John Scalzi, Mark Schultz, Scott Shaw, Gilbert Shelton, Jason Shiga, Jim Silke, Marc Silvestri, Scott Snyder, J. Michael Straczynski, Angelo Torres, Herb Trimpe, Morrie Turner, Michael Uslan, Jim Valentino, Trevor Von Eeden, Mark Waid, Tom Yeates, Anthony Bourdain, Marc Tyler Nobleman	Comic-Con begins charging for Preview Night; pre-registration during 2011 held off-site at Manchester Grand Hyatt Hotel, and number of pre-registrations limited.
46	July 18–21, 2013	San Diego Convention Center, Hilton San Diego Bayfront, and San Diego Marriott Hotel and Marina	130,000+	Sergio Aragonés, Tom Batiuk, Brian Michael Bendis, Jon Bogdanove, Vera Brosgol, Jeffrey Brown, Frank Brunner, Gerry Conway, Denys B. Cowan, Jeromy Cox, Michael Davis, Gene Deitch, José Delbo, Derek T. Dingle, Paul Dini, Mark Evanier, Christine Feehan, Ellen Forney, Gary Frank, Charlotte Fullerton, Neil Gaiman, Tom Gauld, Russ Heath, Faith Erin Hicks, Adam Hughes, Tony Isabella, Georges Jeanty, Dan Jurgens, Richard Kadrey, Sam Kieth, Jim Lee, Paul Levitz, John Lewis, Todd Lockwood, Elliot S. Maggin, Leonard Maltin, Jeff Mariotte, Val Mayerik, Dave McKean, Terry Moore, Dean Mullaney, Ted Naifeh, Mike Norton, Jerry Ordway, Dan Parent, Martin Pasko, Lincoln Peirce, George Pérez, Fred Perry, Richard Pini, Wendy Pini, John Romita Jr., Chris Samnee, Ruth Sanderson, Scott Shaw, Christopher Shy, Louise Simonson, Bill Skarsgård, Jeff Smith, Nick Spencer, J. Michael Straczynski, Duane Swierczynski, Romeo Tanghal Sr., Roy Thomas, Bruce Timm, J. H. Williams III	
47	July 24–27, 2014	San Diego Convention Center, Hilton San Diego Bayfront, and San Diego Marriott Hotel and Marina	130,000+	Mark Brooks, Amanda Conner, Jane Espenson, Jim Lee, Sara E. Mayhew, Jimmy Palmiotti, Joe Quesada, Stan Sakai, Dan Slott, Brian Stelfreeze, J. Michael Straczynski, Brian K. Vaughn, Marc Tyler Nobleman, Gene Luen Yang	
48	July 9–12, 2015	San Diego Convention Center, Hilton San Diego Bayfront, and San Diego Marriott Hotel and Marina	167,000	Jim Lee, Stan Lee, Humberto Ramos, J. Michael Straczynski, Jhonen Vasquez, Skottie Young	Anime rooms, returned to the San Diego Convention Center for 2015.
49	July 21–24, 2016	San Diego Convention Center, Hilton San Diego Bayfront, and San Diego Marriott Hotel and Marina	135,000+	Sergio Aragonés, Peter David, Ben Dunn, Duff Goldman, Jim Lee, Stan Lee, Ed McGuinness, Tsutomu Nihei, Patrick Rothfuss, J. Michael Straczynski	RFID badges are first introduced. This requires attendees to "tap in" as they enter the convention center and official offsite events and "tap out" as they exit. Anime rooms return to Marriott.
50	July 20–23, 2017	San Diego Convention Center, Hilton San Diego Bayfront, and San Diego Marriott Hotel and Marina	130,000+	Sergio Aragonés, Mike Daniels, Paul Dini, Mike Grell, Erica Henderson, Jim Lee, Stan Lee, Jonathan Maberry, Gail Simone, R. L. Stine, J. Michael Straczynski	First year badges are mailed in a box, with an exclusive Comic-Con '17 pin.
51	July 19–22, 2018	San Diego Convention Center, Hilton San Diego Bayfront, and San Diego Marriott Hotel and Marina	130,000+	Yoshitaka Amano, Brian Fies, Duff Goldman, Jim Lee, Trina Robbins, R. A. Salvatore, John Walsh	Online lottery system first implemented for high-demand signings, exclusives, and booth access. First year Harbor Drive and some additional streets are closed to public vehicle traffic from 7am to 9pm Wednesday to Sunday.
52	July 18–21, 2019	San Diego Convention Center, Hilton San Diego Bayfront, and San Diego Marriott Hotel and Marina	135,000+	Preeti Chhibber, Marc Tyler Nobleman	First year Comic-Con shuttles are not operating continuously. Shuttles operated from 5am to 1am during the con. 50th Anniversary of Comic-Con International.
53	~~July 23–26, 2020~~	San Diego Convention Center	N/A		Cancelled due to the COVID-19 pandemic in California. Replaced with virtual event.
54	~~July 22–25, 2021~~	San Diego Convention Center	N/A		Cancelled due to the COVID-19 pandemic in California. Replaced with virtual event.
55	November 26–28, 2021	San Diego Convention Center, San Diego Marriott Marquis & Marina, Martin Luther King Jr. Promenade, Comic-Con Museum, Gaslamp Quarter			Titled as "Comic-Con Special Edition". Unlike previous years, badges were not mailed in advance. Badge pick up occurred in Hall H (instead of Sails Pavilion) after attendees received a wristband, indicating proof of being fully vaccinated against COVID-19 or a negative COVID-19 test no earlier than 48 hours prior to the first day of the event. Covid vaccine/testing verification wristbands were distributed at pop-up booths located outside Halls C and H. Masks were required. First time badges for individual days were not sold. Instead, badges were marketed as a 3-day badge only (Fri-Sun). No preview night on Thurs. No Comic-Con shuttles, however, complementary shuttles between the Comic-Con Museum and the convention center were available. No online lottery system implemented for exclusive booth access. Instead, only one onsite lottery was held (Funko) inside Hall A each morning. First time in a decade that badges did not sell out.
56	July 21–24, 2022	San Diego Convention Center, Hilton San Diego Bayfront, Manchester Grand Hyatt Hotel, San Diego Marriott Marquis & Marina, San Diego Central Library, Comic-Con Museum, Petco Interactive Zone, Omni San Diego Hotel, Children's Park, Gaslamp Quarter, Martin Luther King Jr. Promenade, Embarcadero Marina Park South, Harbor Drive Pedestrian Bridge, Marina	135,000+	Tomi Adeyemi, Lorena Alvarez, Jane Baer, Henry Barajas, Tom Batiuk, Pierce Brown, Cecil Castellucci, Soman Chainani, Amy Chu, Ezra Claytan Daniels, Mark Evanier, Danny Fingeroth, Shaenon Garrity, Marc Hempel, Gilbert Hernandez, Jaime Hernandez, Jock, Keithan Jones, Phil LaMarr, Jim Lee, Miriam Libicki, Tula Lotay, Kevin Maguire, Barbara Mendes, Shannon Messenger, Frank Miller, Bill Morrison, Steve Niles, Nathan W. Pyle, Barbara Randall Kesel, Steve Saffel, Scott Shaw!, Dan Slott, Jeff Smith, Scott Snyder, William Stout, J. Michael Straczynski, Lila Sturges, Mariko Tamaki, Raina Telgemeier, Hidetaka Tenjin, Maggie Thompson, Trino, Mark Wheatley, Sophie Yanow	First in-person San Diego Comic-Con since 2019, returning to its usual July dates. Due to the cancelation of the 2020 show, attendees who had 2020 badges were able to roll badges over to 2021. When the 2021 show was canceled, the same option was available for the 2022 show. Badges were shipped without a commemorative box and an exclusive pin, as in years prior. Masks were required, similar to San Diego Comic-Con "Special Edition" 8 months prior. All valid badge holders were required to show proof of being fully vaccinated against COVID-19 or show proof of a negative COVID-19 test no earlier than 48 hours prior to the first day the badge is valid for. Covid vaccine/testing verification wristbands were distributed at various pop-up booths located around San Diego, with most located in and around the convention center complex, with some expanding to nearby hotels. Comic-Con partnered with CLEAR, which enabled US citizens to streamline the process.
57	July 20–23, 2023	San Diego Convention Center, Hilton San Diego Bayfront, Manchester Grand Hyatt Hotel, San Diego Marriott Marquis & Marina, San Diego Central Library, Comic-Con Museum, Petco Interactive Zone, Omni San Diego Hotel, Children's Park, Gaslamp Quarter, Martin Luther King Jr. Promenade, Embarcadero Marina Park South, Harbor Drive Pedestrian Bridge, Marina	150,000+	Victoria Aveyard, Darcie Little Badger, Jerry Beck, Jim Benton, Holly Black, J. Scott Campbell, Ricardo Caté, Janice Chiang, Becky Cloonan, Felicia Day, Jo Duffy, Mark Evanier, Barbara Friedlander, Bill Griffith, Simon Hanselmann, Junji Ito, Keith Knight, Jim Lee, Todd McFarlane, Frank Miller, Stephen Notley, Joe Quesada, John Romita Jr, P. Craig Russell, Ben Saunders, Linda Sejic, Stjepan Sejic, John Semper, Scott Shaw, Jeff Smith, Beau Smith, Rachel Smythe, Matthew Southworth, Merrie Spaeth, Steenz, Prabhas, Garth Stein, William Stout, J. Michael Straczynski, Mariko Tamaki, Raina Telgemeier, Ben Templesmith, Maggie Thompson, Ron Turner, David F. Walker, Brian Walker, Lee Weeks, Martha Wells, Alex de Campi	Proof of COVID-19 vaccination is not required, returning to the 2019 pre-pandemic era. Similar to SDCC 2022, badges were mailed to US attendees in a discreet envelope without a decorative box and pin. The 2023 Writers Guild of America strike as well as the 2023 SAG-AFTRA strike directly affected the con. Many companies and talent cancelled panels and signings ahead of the convention, due to the uncertainty of the strike. However, it did not restrict talent from promoting their personal work (e.g. Jamie Lee Curtis promoted her Mother Nature novel). The strikes resulted in few celebrity appearances, leading to Hall H not being used at all on Sunday. Notably, the cast of Philippine television series Voltes V: Legacy attended the event, becoming the first Philippine television program to attend Comic-Con.
58	July 25–28, 2024	San Diego Convention Center, Hilton San Diego Bayfront, Manchester Grand Hyatt Hotel, San Diego Marriott Marquis & Marina, San Diego Central Library, Comic-Con Museum, Petco Interactive Zone, Omni San Diego Hotel, Children's Park, Gaslamp Quarter, Martin Luther King Jr. Promenade, Embarcadero Marina Park South, Harbor Drive Pedestrian Bridge, Marina	135,000+	Robert Downey Jr., Ryan Reynolds, Hugh Jackman, Chris Hemsworth, Brian Tyree Henry, Keegan-Michael Key, Harrison Ford, Giancarlo Esposito, Tim Blake Nelson, Danny Ramirez, Anthony Mackie, Julia Louis-Dreyfus, Florence Pugh, Sebastian Stan, David Harbour, Pedro Pascal, Vanessa Kirby, Joseph Quinn, Ebon Moss-Bachrach, Michael C. Hall, Patrick Gibson, Mark Hamill, Valorie Curry, Nathan Mitchell, Susan Heyward, Chace Crawford, Antony Starr, Jeff Fischer, Dee Bradley Baker, Rachael MacFarlane, Scott Grimes, Wendy Schaal, Matt Weitzman, Matt Groening, Kevin Smith, Chris Hardwick, Norman Reedus, Jeffrey Dean Morgan, Brian Taylor, Mike Mignola, Ncuti Gatwa, Millie Gibson, Russel T Davies, Ismael Cruz Cordova.	Unlike the SDCC 2023, the event returned to Hall H with more celebrity appearances, making it the first time to do so since 2022.
59	July 24–27, 2025	San Diego Convention Center, Hilton San Diego Bayfront, Manchester Grand Hyatt Hotel, San Diego Marriott Marquis & Marina, San Diego Central Library, Comic-Con Museum, Petco Interactive Zone, Omni San Diego Hotel, Children's Park, Gaslamp Quarter, Martin Luther King Jr. Promenade, Embarcadero Marina Park South, Harbor Drive Pedestrian Bridge, Marina	TBA	George Lucas (debut), Dan Aykroyd, Anthony Mackie, Peter Dinklage, Elijah Wood, Stephanie Beatriz, Raymond Cruz, Gabriel Iglesias, Jo Koy, Alec Baldwin, David Dastmalchian, Chyler Leigh, Josh Hutcherson, Jason Blum, Paul Feig, Rob Reiner. Trey Parker, Matt Stone, Mike Judge, Andy Samberg, Mark Hamill, Jared Leto, Jeff Bridges, Gillian Anderson, Timothy Olyphant, Tiffany Haddish, Sam Heughan, Michael C. Hall, Krysten Ritter, Elle Fanning, John Cena, Sam Rockwell, Craig Robinson, James Gunn, Awkwafina, Marc Maron, Natasha Lyonne, Maria Bakalova, Ryan Gosling, Rebecca Romijn, Alex Borstein, Seth Green, Jennifer Tilly.	
60	July 23-26, 2026			Johnny Depp, John Francis Daley, Keke Palmer, Tom DeLonge, Adria Arjona, Dan Stevens, Dave Bautista, Seth Green, Eric Nam, Jessica Matten, Mike McCready, Rick Moranis, Josh Gad, Lewis Pullman, Josh Greenbaum, Daphne Zuniga. Liza Soberano, H.E.R, Bini, Dave Franco, Kevin Feige, Robert Downey Jr., Chris Evans, Pedro Pascal, Vanessa Kirby, Joseph Quinn, Ebon Moss-Bachrach, Ryan Reynolds, Ryan Gosling, Letitia Wright, Winston Duke, David Jonsson, Anthony Russo, Joe Russo, Ryan Reynolds, Sgt. Slaughter. Paul Rudd, David Harbour, Simu Liu, Jessica Biel, Rebecca Romijn, Jenna Fischer, Billie Joe Armstrong, Kyle Chandler, Jamie Campbell Bower, Michelle Yeoh, Hunter Schafer, Lauren Lapkus.	

== In the media ==
Comic-Con has served as the setting for Mark Hamill's Comic Book: The Movie, and for an episode of the HBO television series Entourage, the latter of which, while set at the event, was not filmed there. Comic-Con also served as an excuse for the fictional characters Seth Cohen and Ryan Atwood's trip to Tijuana, Mexico in episode 7 ("The Escape") of the first season of TV series The O.C. The convention also featured prominently as a setting for the Numb3rs episode "Graphic". In season 4 of Beauty and the Geek, an episode was featured where the contestants traveled to Comic-Con 07 and were given a challenge to create their own superheroes. In an episode of Punk'd, Hilary Swank gets Punk'd after an "attack from talking robot". In season 5, episode six, of the Showtime show Weeds, attendees from Comic-Con 2009 are seen in Silas and Doug's medicinal marijuana club.

Comic-Con featured at some length in the 2011 movie Paul which stars Simon Pegg and Nick Frost.

Issue No. 72 of The Invincible Iron Man (January 1975) was set at the July–August 1974 Comic-Con at the El Cortez Hotel and featured cameos by a few of the special guests. The fifth Kelly Green graphic novel The Comic-Con Heist (1987) written by Leonard Starr and drawn by Stan Drake was set at the 1983 con and depicted such regulars as Will Eisner, Milton Caniff, Burne Hogarth and Jack Kirby along with Shel Dorf; it initially only appeared in French until Classic Comics Press issued a collection of all five volumes of the series in English in 2016. Other comics set at the convention include Archie No. 538 (September 2003), Archie Giant Series No. 601 (October 1989) and No. 624 (October 1991), G.I. Joe No. 180 (July 2012), Dazzler No. 30 (January 1984), Lobo Convention Special ([September] 1993) and Fanboys Vs Zombies. 1992–1995 the Con partnered with Dark Horse Comics for an annual San Diego Comic Con Comics giveaway to attendees spotlighting characters published by Dark Horse.

Comic-Con is mentioned in the long-running CBS geek-targeted sitcom The Big Bang Theory in several episodes, and in NBC's Chuck in the episode "Chuck Versus the Sandworm", as an event the characters enjoy attending. On the Futurama episode "Lrrreconcilable Ndndifferences", the main characters attend the 3010 convention (with it being referred to as "Comic-Con Intergalactic" and the iconic eye logo now sporting multiple eyes), where Fry looks for approval for his own comic while Bender attends a panel from Matt Groening (creator of Futurama as well as The Simpsons) on his new show "Futurella" (a twist on the title of the show and a parody of its cancellation by Fox).

In "It's My Party and I'll Bang If I Want To", an episode of the 2011 season of The Real World: San Diego, the cast attends Comic-Con made up as zombies in order to pass out promotional flyers for the House of Blues, where they worked as part of their season work assignment. Filmmaker Morgan Spurlock released a 2011 documentary feature film set at the convention, Comic-Con Episode IV: A Fan's Hope. Writer Robert Salkowitz also used the 2011 Comic-Con as a backdrop for his book Comic-Con and the Business of Pop Culture, an analysis of the comics industry's 21st-century dilemmas and what the future may hold.

From 2015 to 2019, Conan O'Brien recorded a week of live shows from Comic-Con at the nearby Spreckels Theatre.

In 2015, the Food Network series Cake Masters had an episode where Duff Goldman presented a cake at Comic-Con to the cast of Fantastic Four.

=== Comic-Con Begins Podcast ===
In 2020, SiriusXM in association with Stitcher started production on COMIC-CON BEGINS: Origin Stories of the San Diego Comic-Con and the Rise of Modern Fandom. The podcast is a six-part mini-series chronicling the birth and evolution of San Diego Comic-Con, and is told by over 50 of the original contributors. Among the founders there are also interviews with celebrities like Felicia Day, Ho Che Anderson, Jackie Estrada, Scott Aukerman, Trina Robbins, Kevin Smith, Neil Gaiman, and Bruce Campbell. The podcast was hosted by Brinke Stevens of Slumber Party Massacre. The podcast was expanded into the book See You at San Diego: An Oral History of Comic-Con, Fandom, and the Triumph of Geek Culture by creator Mathew Klickstein and published by Fantagraphics on September 6, 2022. The book includes forewords by cartoonists Stan Sakai and Jeff Smith, and an afterword by Wu-Tang Clan's RZA. The audiobook version was released on the same day by Blackstone Audio.

On March 28, 2024, it was announced that Academy Award and Emmy Award nominated executive producer David Permut and producer Oscar Boyson will be creating a feature-length documentary about Comic-Con, based on the book and podcast series.

== Comic-Con Magazine ==
Comic-Con Magazine, formerly known as Update, is the official magazine of Comic-Con, WonderCon, and SAM: Storytelling Across Media, published free by San Diego Comic-Con International in the United States. The seed of Comic-Con Magazine was a short one-shot issue of The Spirit, based on Comic-Con and sold exclusively in 1976 at Comic-Con. The Comic-Con Magazine debuted as Update in July 2005 and mainly focused on the winners of the Eisner Awards. The last Update issue appeared in July 2008; then it went on hiatus. When it came back, it was as Comic-Con Magazine, which not only covered San Diego Comic-Con, but also WonderCon and the Alternative Press Expo, more commonly known as APE (which the con owned through 2014). The new Comic-Con Magazine features interviews with Comic-Con attendees and complete coverage of Comic-Con events. The fourth issue of Comic-Con Magazine was a hybrid with Comic-Con's Souvenir Book with cover art by Alex Ross, in full color and exclusive to Comic-Con attendees.

== Exhibitors ==
A large number of exhibitors from art, comics, games, film, TV, and publishing make their appearance at Comic-Con.

There are three types of exhibitors at San Diego Comic Con. Inside the convention center, which requires a badge to visit during the convention, includes artists alley and the main exhibitor hall. Artist Alley is for up and coming artists who are new to the pop culture world by selling their new books, comics, toys, and or services. They range from local companies and businesses in Southern California to international ones, but are mainly private endeavors. Artist Alley is usually located in Hall G of the convention center. Spaces for these exhibitors are highly sought after and are on a lottery and need-based system.

The main exhibit hall, which includes larger, well-recognized companies, takes up halls F through A. These companies sell or promote new and upcoming movies, television shows, and video games, as well as featuring toys and exclusives with many selling for hundreds or even thousands on the secondary markets outside the convention. Some notable recurring companies include Lego, Hasbro, Funko, Hallmark Cards, Nickelodeon, Cartoon Network, The Walt Disney Company, and Blizzard Entertainment. In the 21st century, the convention has drawn toy and collectibles designers who sell "Comic-Con Exclusive" products. Most such exclusives are licensed properties of film, comic book, and animation characters.

=== Off site ===
The other type of exhibitors includes offsite exhibitors, booths, and events which are located outside the convention center. These locations are usually within walking distance of the convention center, but have been moving into nearby parks in recent years. Some notable examples include Gaslamp Quarter, Petco Park, and Children's Park. In recent years, these offsite events have no connection to Comic-Con. In the past, most sites have not required a Comic-Con badge. In 2017, one example was a virtual reality and immersive set based on the movie Blade Runner 2049. In 2018, these examples included a Taco Bell Demolition Man themed pop-up restaurant in the Gaslamp and a Shake Shack Bob's Burgers themed pop-up restaurant in Mission Valley. However, there are some official offsite events that require a badge. In 2018, it was estimated that nearly 200,000 people would be in downtown San Diego due to Comic-Con related exhibits and events.

Fans were able to experience the spirit of San Diego Comic-Con 2025 through numerous free events and brand activations located outside the main convention center. The Gaslamp Quarter and Petco Park Interactive Zone serve as hubs for these pop-up experiences, including immersive exhibits. Examples of past activations include an Abbott Elementary-themed block party and Hulu's "King of the Hill Backyard BBQ." There was also a Twisted Metal bumper car battle, an Alien: Earth immersive experience, and the Hello Kitty Cafe Truck. There were about 300,000 participants in these outside activations in 2025.

== Overcrowding ==
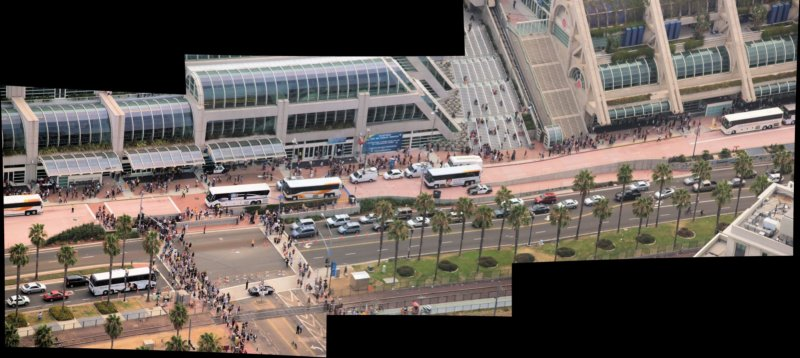
Comic Con crowds in 2011 as seen from a helicopter

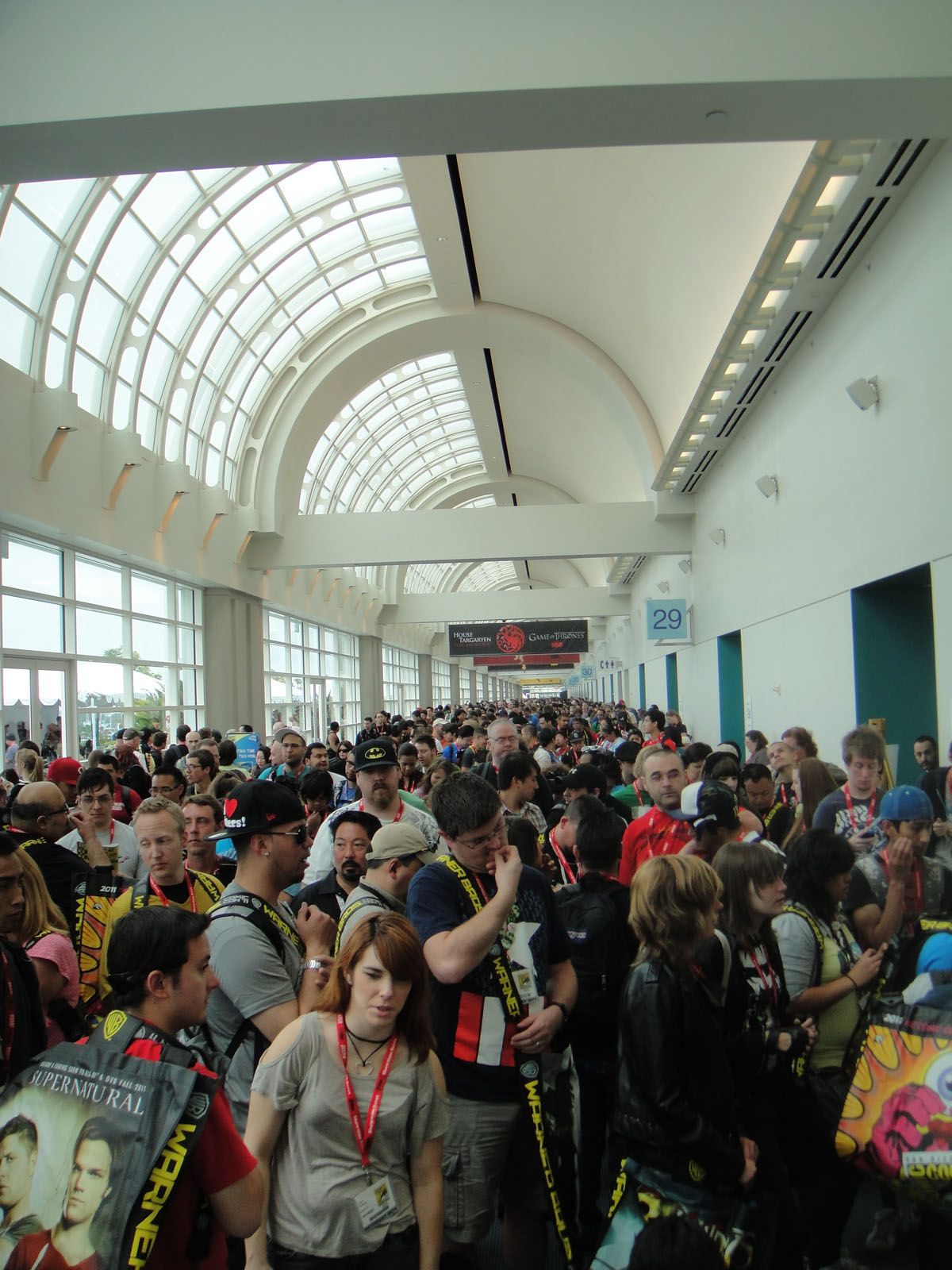
Comic-Con crowd inside the second floor of the convention center in 2011 waiting for the exhibition hall to open

Capacity attendance at Comic-Con in 2006 and 2007 has caused crowding issues. Concerns have been raised that the event is possibly too large for the San Diego Convention Center, Comic-Con's home through at least 2024. In 2006, Comic-Con, for the first time, had to close registration for a few hours on Saturday to accommodate crowds. In response, for 2007, Comic-Con introduced a new three-day membership that did not include Saturday. Nevertheless, the 2007 show went on to sell out Saturday, as well as Friday and Sunday for the first time. Additionally, both the four-day and three-day memberships sold out for the first time. For 2008, the three-day memberships were abandoned and the convention decided to sell memberships only in advance, with no on-site registration. In 2008, all memberships were sold out before the convention for the first time. This sellout has given rise to the new phenomenon of Comic-Con memberships being scalped for exorbitant prices on websites such as eBay and Craigslist.

In April 2008, David Glanzer, Comic-Con's director of marketing and public relations, commented on the organization's desire to remain in San Diego:

We've been approached by other cities, [but] I don't think anybody wants to leave San Diego. I certainly don't. It's a perfect fit for us. It's expensive, whether it be paying for the street signs that tell you what streets are closed, or for any police or the hall or any of the myriad things, it's expensive. But it's a great city. There's been some talk of expansion of the center, which we would certainly welcome. Hopefully if everything lines up, we will be here for many more years.

Heidi McDonald reported on her blog The Beat as of October 7, 2009, Preview Night for the 2010 show had already sold out. Glazner explained the early sell-out:

For 2010 the decision was made to offer an option (of whether they wanted to attend Preview Night) to those who pre-registered for four-day badges. We limited the number of badges for Preview Night to the number of those who attended in 2008.

Mark Evanier on his blog News from ME noted as of November 9, 2009, that all 4-day passes for the 2010 show had already been sold out. On February 23, 2010, The Orange County Register reported that the larger Anaheim Convention Center in Anaheim would be making a bid to become the new home of Comic-Con starting in 2013. On September 30, 2010, Comic Con announced that they had extended their stay up to 2015. The North County Times reported on July 26, 2010, that 4-day passes with access to Preview night for the 2011 Convention had sold out two hours before the 2010 convention closed. Comic-Con International announced that 4-day passes for the 2014 convention (July 24–27) would no longer be available and only single days would be sold. Due to overcrowding, organizers of the event capped attendance; this cap has been in place since 2007.

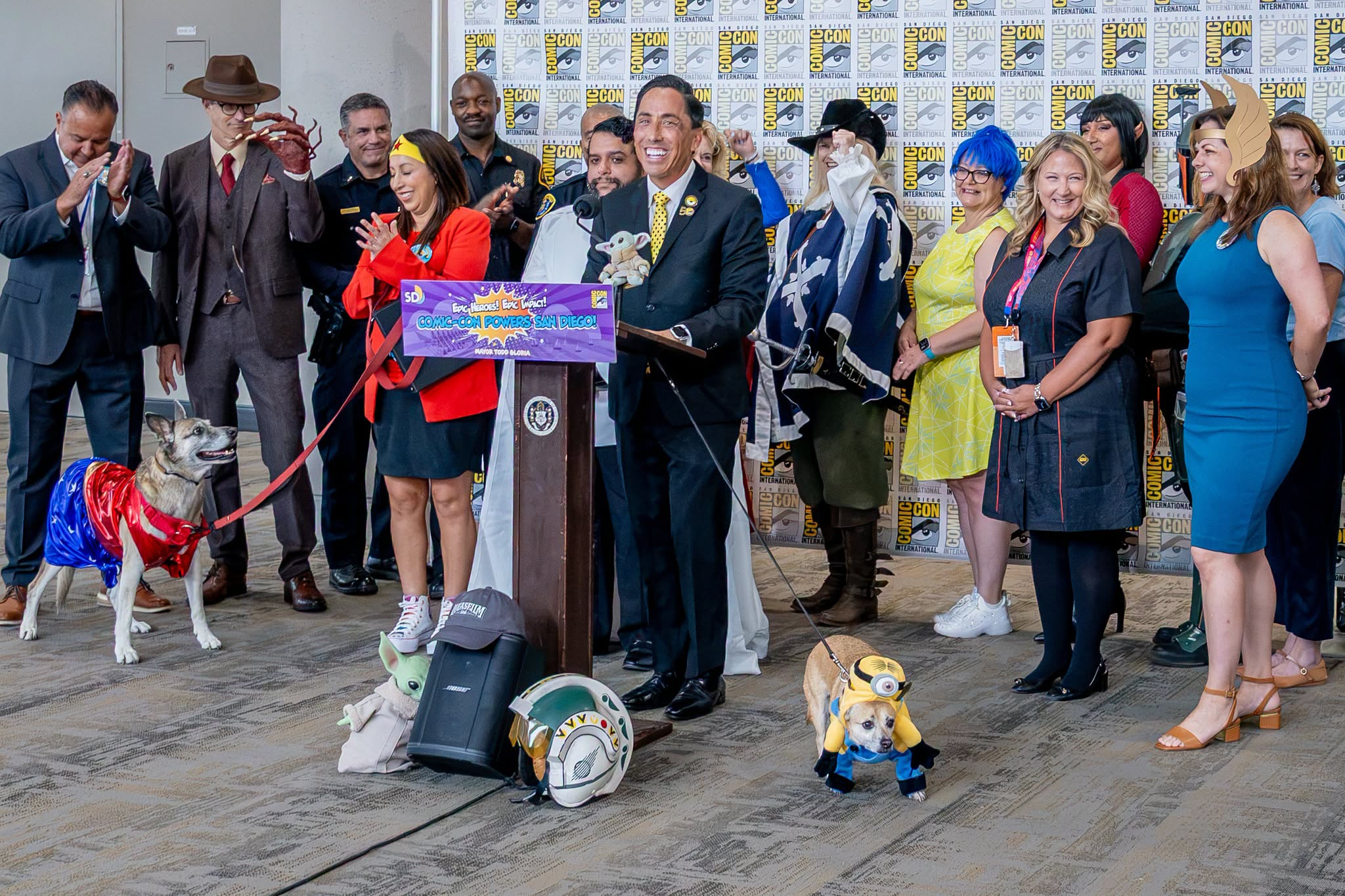
Todd Gloria with representatives of Comic-Con International 2026 during an announcement that the event is staying in San Diego through 2030.

As of October 2013, a $520 million proposed expansion to the San Diego Convention Center received approval from the California Coastal Commission. The proposed expansion would increase the available space within the convention center and had a target completion date of early 2016. The expansion would add approximately 225,000 square feet of exhibit space, an additional 35%; and a brand-new 80,000 square foot ballroom, 20% larger than Hall H. The plan would also add a second tower to the Hilton Bayfront hotel, adding 500 rooms adjacent to the Convention Center. Due to the proposed expansion of the convention center, Comic Con extended its contract for San Diego to 2016. In 2014, convention center expansion was halted due to a lawsuit. As of July 2015, convention center expansion is effectively frozen, partly because the city no longer has financing lined up for it (any financing plan would involve taxpayer money and would have to be approved by a public vote), and partly because the city lost the rights to the only contiguous parcel of land where expansion could occur. Other cities, including Los Angeles, began to seek to have Comic-Con move out of San Diego; In 2015, Comic-Con entered into negotiations with San Diego. As a result of these negotiations, Comic-Con entered into a contract to stay in San Diego through 2018. The commitment to San Diego was extended to 2021, then to 2024.

== Accidents and incidents ==
In 2010, a man was stabbed near the eye with a pen. The altercation occurred in the Hall H panel over a seat, and the suspect was arrested.

In 2012, a 53-year-old woman was struck and killed by a motorist Tuesday as she tried to cross the street in front of the San Diego Convention Center, police said. The woman tripped and hit the car while crossing at the intersection of 5th and Harbor. She had been part of the crowd camping out for the Twilight panel.

In 2013, a young woman attempted to jump off the balcony of a local high-rise, but nearby stuntmen prevented it.

In 2014, multiple pedestrians marching in an off-site ZombieWalk were struck by a car forcing its way through an intersection. A 64-year-old woman sustained serious injuries to her arm; two others had minor injuries.

The same year, a teenage cosplayer was initially thought to have been sexually assaulted early Sunday morning, and a suspect was arrested on Sunday at the San Diego Marriott Hotel and Marina. Police later stated that the teenage girl was injured in a fall, and the arrested individual was released without any charges.

In 2024, a three-alarm kitchen fire started in a nearby steakhouse caused the evacuation of around 1200 attendees of an "Iceberg Lounge" promotional event for the HBO series The Penguin. The next day, actress Jennifer Garner got stuck in an elevator and had to call the fire department to get her out. Also in 2024, the "San Diego Human Trafficking Task Force" conducted a multi-agency undercover operation that arrested 14 and rescued 10 victims. According to the California Attorney General's Office, "sex buyers were using the San Diego Comic-Con Convention to seek out potential victims".

In 2026, an anti-ICE protest, hosted by the San Diego & Imperial Counties Labor Council, AFL-CIO, formed outside and marched among attendees at Comic-Con downtown.

== Trademark ==
In 2014, San Diego Comic-Con sent a cease and desist order to the organizers of Salt Lake Comic Con, asserting that "Comic-Con" and "Comic-Con International" were registered trademarks of the convention, and that use of the term "comic con" in any form was trademark infringement as it implies an unauthorized association with San Diego Comic-Con. A U.S. court ruled in favor of San Diego Comic-Con and awarded $20,000 in damages (albeit not considering the infringement to be willful). Phoenix Comiccon changed its name to Phoenix Comic Fest as a proactive move to avoid possible legal issues in the wake of this ruling. They then filed a motion in an Arizona Federal Court to strike down San Diego Comic Convention's trademark. In 2017, the Salt Lake Comic Con changed its name to FanX Salt Lake Comic Convention (or just FanX). On January 16, 2018, Salt Lake Comic Con filed a motion for a new trial.

== See also ==
- Comic Art Convention
- Science fiction convention
