= Comic-Con Museum =

Museum in San Diego, California, US

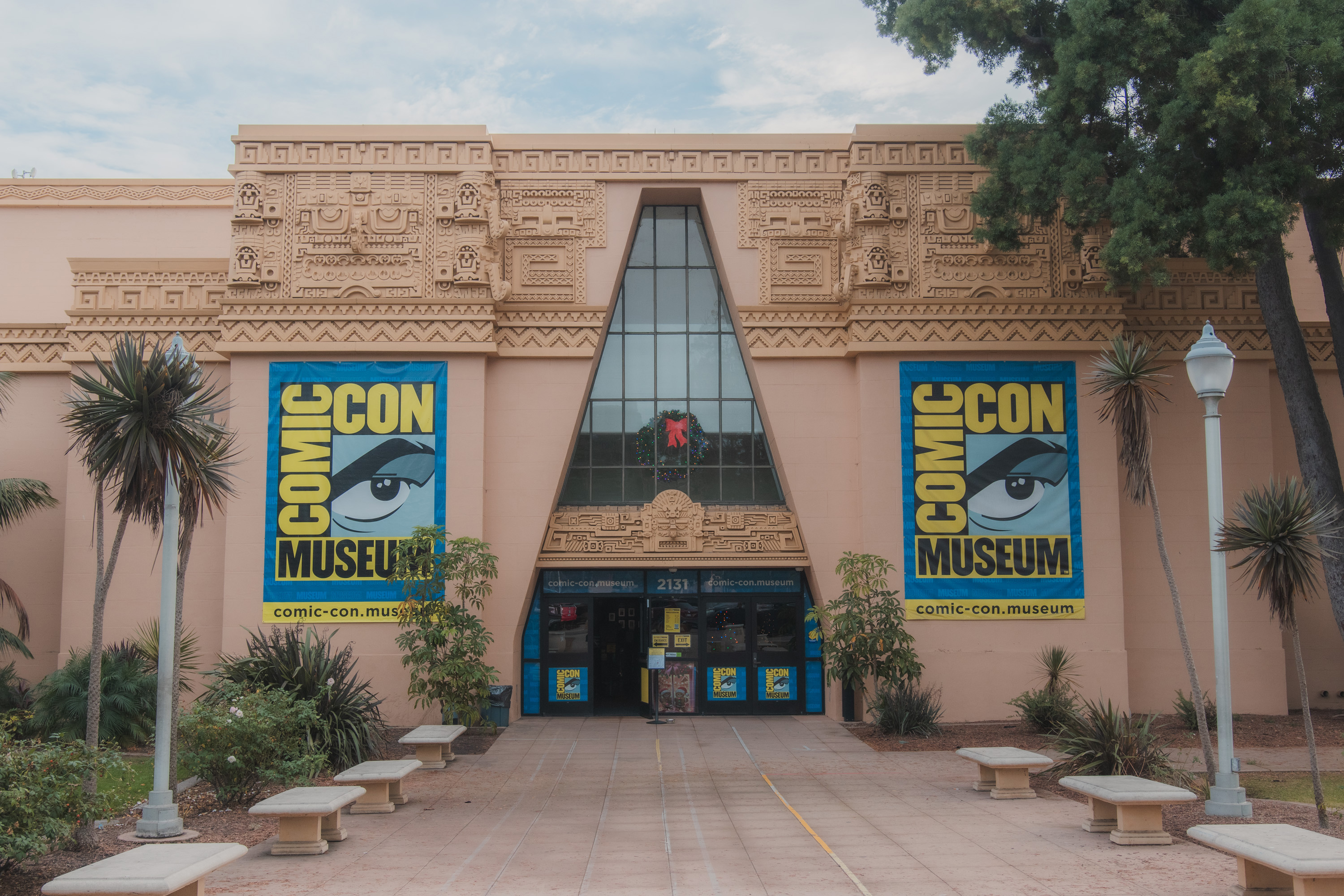
- Entrance to Comic-Con Museum (2024)

- Location within San Diego Location within California Location within the United States
- Established: November 26, 2021; 4 years ago
- Location: 2131 Pan American Plaza, San Diego, California, U.S.
- Coordinates: 32.7273°N 117.1524°W
- Type: Art museum
- Owner: Comic-Con International
- Public transit access: 7 (Park Boulevard & Presidents Way), San Diego Metropolitan Transit System
- Website: www.comic-con.org/museum/

The Comic-Con Museum is an art museum in Balboa Park in San Diego, California. The museum focuses on comics and related popular arts through exhibits, programs, and events drawn from San Diego Comic-Con.

== History ==
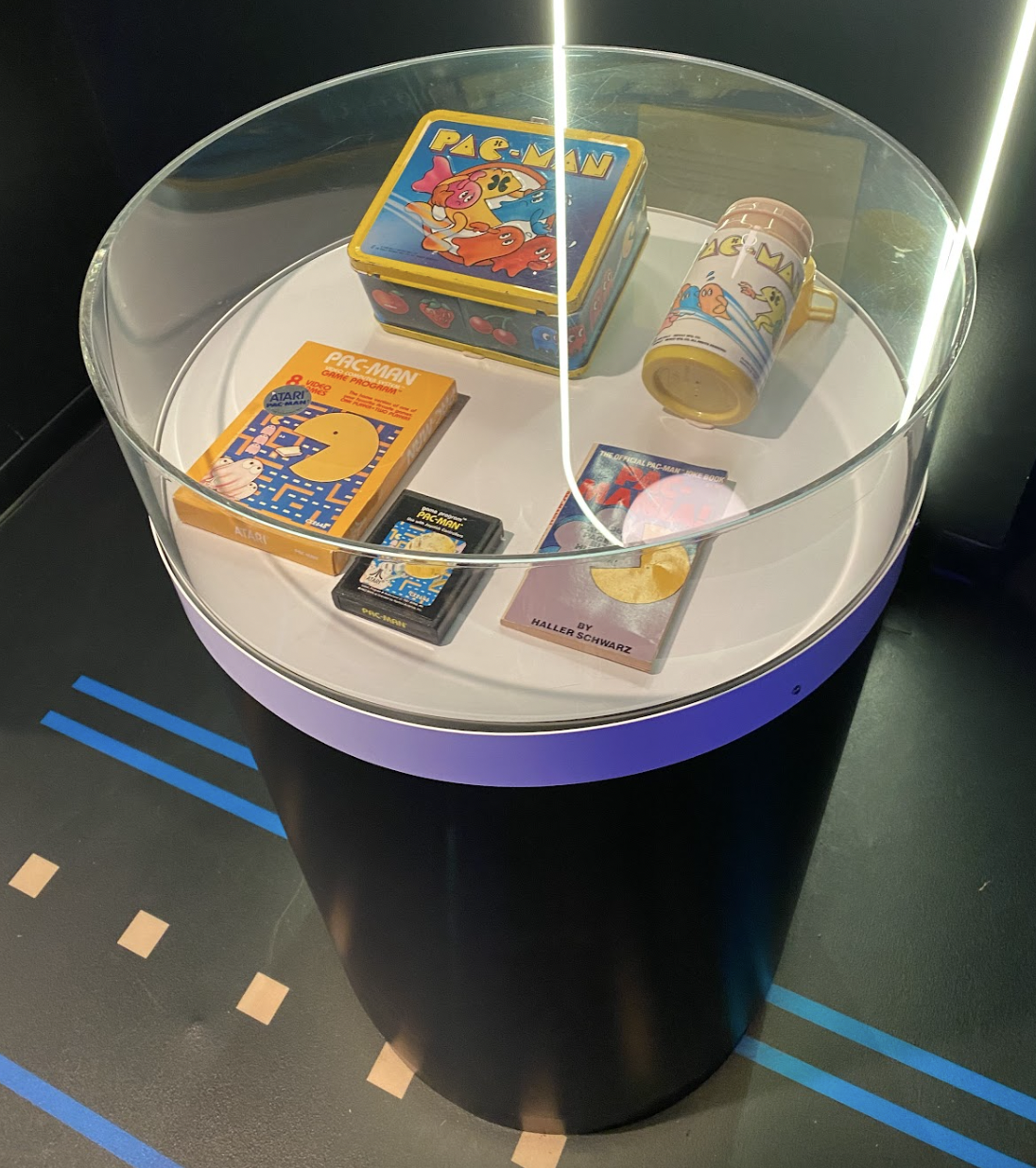
Display from Pac-Man exhibit, 2022

The Comic-Con Museum is a year-round experience focused on comics and popular arts, similar to the annual San Diego Comic-Con. It replaced the former San Diego Hall of Champions museum, located in Balboa Park. The building was offered to Comic-Con by the City of San Diego in March 2017. The museum was completed in phases until its grand opening on November 26, 2024. Many popular characters have been featured in the museum's exhibitions, including Batman, Wonder Woman, Pac-Man, and Spider-Man. Although there are no specific criteria for which characters or series are selected, the museum chooses its exhibits based on all forms of art, such as film, the written word, original art, scripts, and more.

== Special exhibits ==
=== Five Decades of Comic-Con ===
The exhibit, “Cover Story: Five Decades of Comic-Con”, showcases the original cover art of comics from the last 50 years. The exhibit allows visitors to see how the events and comics have changed over the decades. The collection of souvenir books, articles, advertisements, and artwork at the museum grew over the years. The exhibit features work from famous artists like Jack Kirby, Jim Lee, and Frank Miller. For example, artist John Romita's comics consist of Wolverine, Spider-Man, She-Hulk, and the 2019 cover for the 50th anniversary of Comic-Con.

=== Batman ===
In 2019, on Comic-Con's 50th anniversary, Batman was the first inductee into the Comic-Con Museum’s Hall of Fame. Adam Smith, the museum's executive director, stated, "We needed to start somewhere, and the 80th anniversary of Batman made it a good 2019 choice." At the opening, the DC Comic publishers, Warner Bros, the artists and writers, and Michael Uslan were in attendance. Michael Uslan was the executive producer of the 1989 Batman movie and is often credited for being responsible for the transformation of Batman from a comic series into a pop culture phenomenon.

=== Spider-Man ===
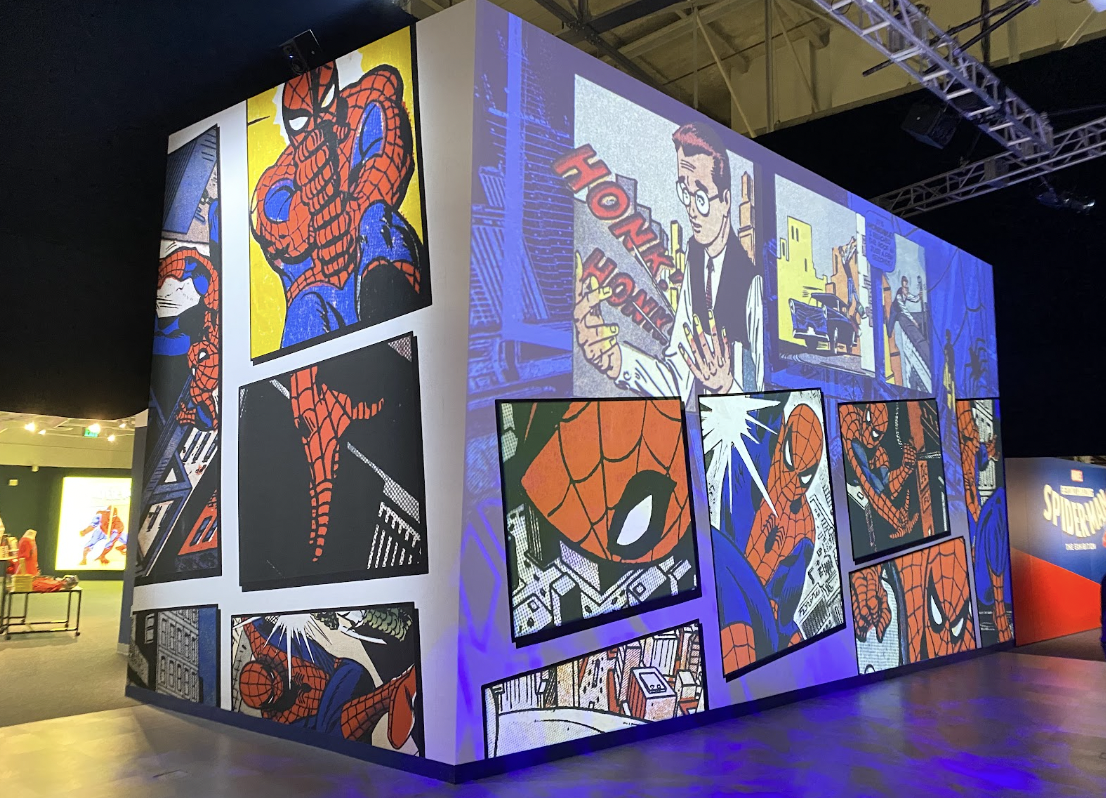
Display wall from Spider-Man: Beyond Amazing exhibit, 2022

On July 1, 2022, the Comic-Con Museum opened a new exhibit—Spider-Man: Beyond Amazing—The Exhibition—created by Semmel Exhibitions and Marvel Entertainment dedicated to Spider-Man. The exhibit includes artifacts from Spider-Man comics, movies, animation, toys, video games, and merchandise from the 1960s to the present day. As co-curators, Dr. Ben Saunders and Patrick A. Reed designed the exhibit to showcase Spider-Man’s appearances with real-world events, the creators, and the history of Spider-Man. Their three-level approach included the cultural history of Spider-Man throughout the years and how the character has been incorporated into real-world social issues; the publishing history and creative team behind creating the comics, which includes Steve Ditko (artist) and Stan Lee (writer); and a look at the evolution and expansion of the multiverse that was created around the character of Spider-Man.

The Spider-Man Exhibit highlights the relatability of the superhero. When the topic of Spider-Man came up during C.B. Celuski and Nick Lowe’s visit to the Comic-Con Museum, Celuski cited how "Luckily, Spider-Man has a mask, so anyone can see themselves in that, but the more we do this sort of thing, these characters will resonate with people." Celuski, an editor-in-chief at Marvel, believes that things like the Comic-Con Museum’s Spider-Man Exhibit are a reminder of why fans of movies and superheroes seem to relate to the characters in the Spider-Man universe, whether that be the original Peter Parker from the 1960s to today with representative characters such as Gwen Stacy and Miles Morales. Co-creator of the exhibit, Patrick Reed, stated the museum's focus was to "create massive immersive experiences that combine physical objects and high-resolution digital imagery, "selfie moments" featuring life-sized foam sculptures produced by Gentle Giant, and other cutting-edge features." Viewers can guide themselves throughout the exhibit, analyzing a wide range of artifacts, original art, and digital canvases. Featured artists include Sara Pichelli, John Romita Sr, John Buscema, and Gil Kane.

=== Hemingway in Comics ===
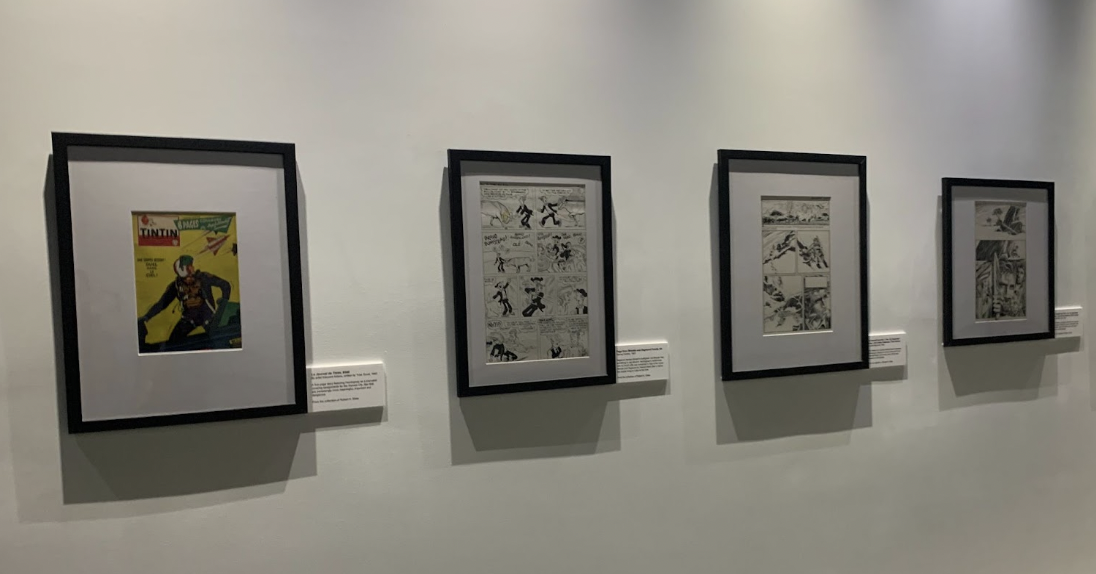
Images from Hemingway in Comics Exhibition, 2022

The Hemingway in Comics exhibit highlights Ernest Hemingway’s presence in comics, including more than 120 appearances from 18 countries. Inspired by Robert K. Elder’s book of the same title, the exhibition explores what it means to be a pop-culture icon and how that image can change over time. The museum showcases 40 pieces of original artwork from various artists that are featured in the book. The exhibit emphasizes Hemingway’s flaws and complexities, both as a person and as an icon; some depictions are reverent, some love Hemingway, and others make fun of him. Some of the works highlight instances of his anti-semitic, sexist, and hyper-masculine vision of society from the perspective of the artists. The exhibit depicts Hemingway’s inconsistent personality through both mockery and realism to make known what it means to become an icon and how a person’s image can change over time.

== Dungeons & Dragons ==
Talks about the Comic-Con museum that recently came out featuring Dungeons & Dragons event. Anyone new or experienced may participate and play and the idea is that the experienced players will help teach and introduce the game to new comers. This community event where people can play at the tables will be hosted only on Friday, June 21st for their summer night series. Afterwards, it will stay open as a museum in Balboa park where people can tour and appreciate the original art made possibly introducing them into their next favorite hobby.

== Community outreach ==
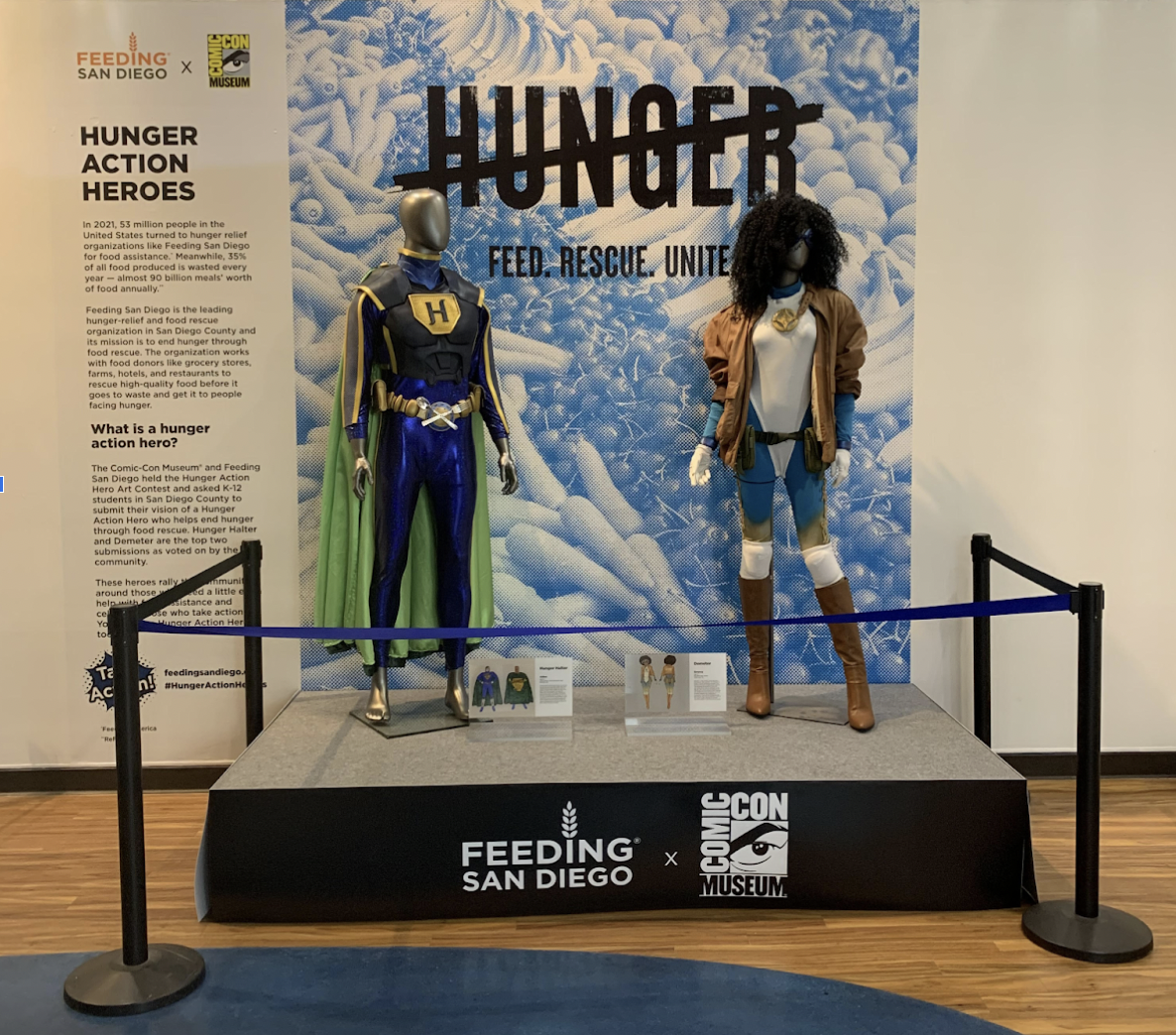
Costumes for Hunger Action Heroes, 2022

The Comic-Con Museum collaborated with Feeding San Diego to launch a competition for K-12 students to design hunger-fighting superheroes. The winning designs were turned into costumes by prop designer Allan Lavigne and are now on display at the museum.
