= Amici Park =

Park in San Diego, California, U.S.

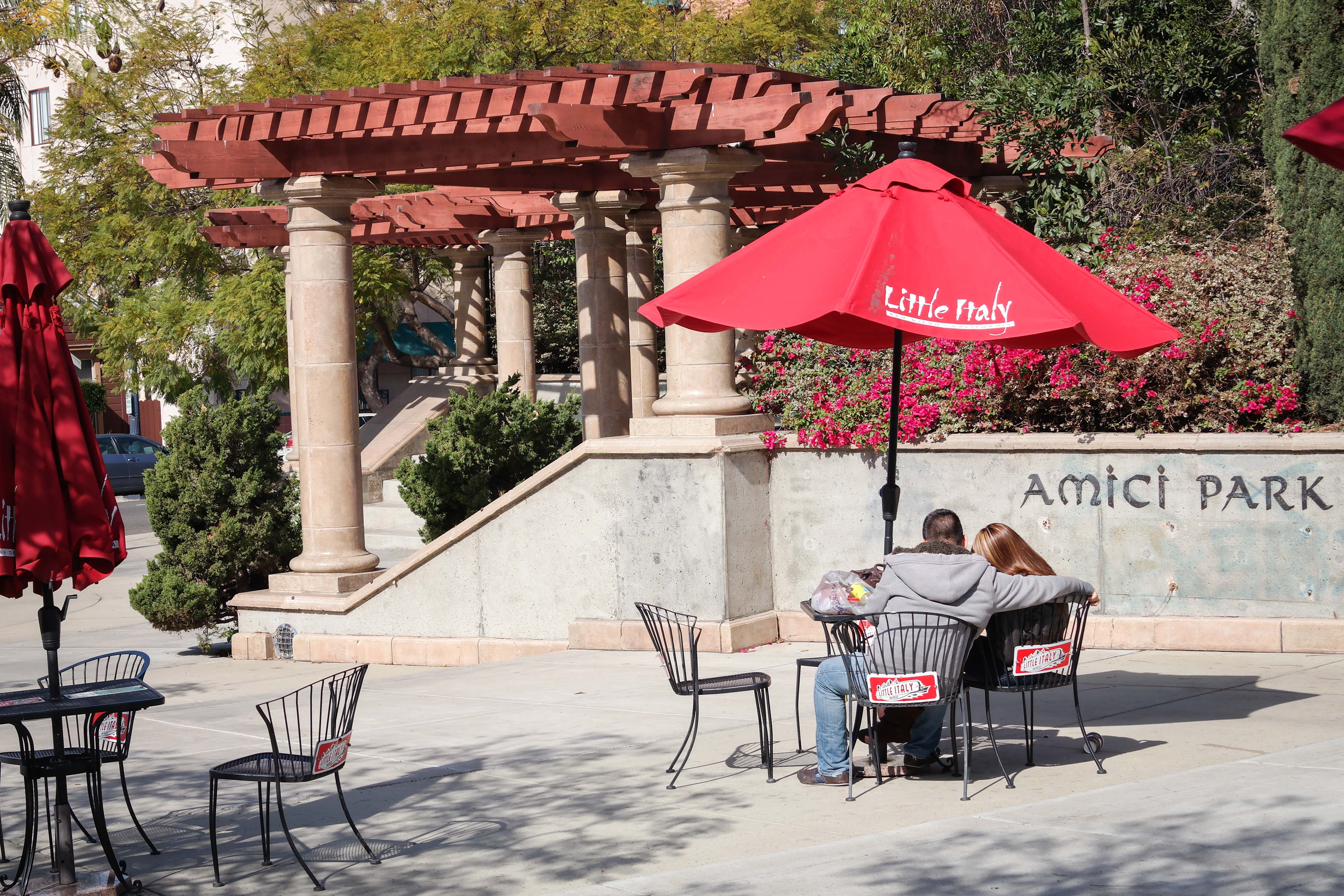
- The park in 2014

- Location within San Diego Location within California Location within the United States
- Interactive map of Amici Park
- Type: Urban park
- Location: San Diego, California, U.S.
- Coordinates: 32.723110°N 117.166055°W
- Owner: City of San Diego

Amici Park is a park in Little Italy, San Diego. The park contains multiples bocce ball courts, a small amphitheater and a large playing field. The park is used by students of Washington Elementary School. The park also has bronze sculptures of dinners, with embossed recipes, from Little Italy's early immigrants. It is located one block uphill from the central plaza of Little Italy.

== See also ==
- List of parks in San Diego
