= List of parks in San Diego =

This is a list of parks in the city of San Diego, California:

== List of parks ==
- Allied Gardens Community Park
- Amici Park
- Balboa Park (cultural park)
- Belmont Park (historic theme park)
- Black Mountain Open Space Park
- Cabrillo National Monument (admission fee)
- Chicano Park
- Children's Park
- Chollas Lake Park
- Clay Park
- County Administration Center Waterfront Park
- Cowles Mountain
- Cypress Canyon Park
- Dog Beach (off-leash dog area in Ocean Beach )
- Dusty Rhodes Park (with off-leash dog area)
- Famosa Slough State Marine Conservation Area(natural wetland preserve)
- Jerabek Park
- Kate Sessions Park
- Liberty Station waterfront park
- Los Peñasquitos Canyon Preserve
- Marion Bear Park
- Martin Luther King Jr. Promenade
- Mission Bay Park
- Mission Trails Regional Park
- Mount Soledad
- Murray Ridge Neighborhood Park
- Old Town San Diego State Historic Park
- Otay Valley Regional Park
- Pantoja Park (A San Diego Historic Landmark)
- Point Loma Native Plant Garden
- Presidio Park
- Rancho Bernardo Community Park (with off-leash dog area)
- Robb Field (athletic fields and skateboard park)
- Rose Canyon Open Space Park
- Ruocco Park
- San Diego River Park
- San Dieguito River Park
- San Diego Zoo (admission fee)
- San Diego Zoo Safari Park (admission fee)
- San Pasqual / Clevenger Canyon Open Space Park
- SeaWorld San Diego (admission fee)
- Spanish Landing Park
- Sunset Cliffs Natural Park
- Sycamore Canyon County Park
- Tecolote Canyon Natural Park and Nature Center
- Torrey Pines City Park (a part of Torrey Pines Gliderport)
- Torrey Pines State Natural Reserve
