= Martin Luther King Jr. Promenade =

Linear park in San Diego, California, U.S.

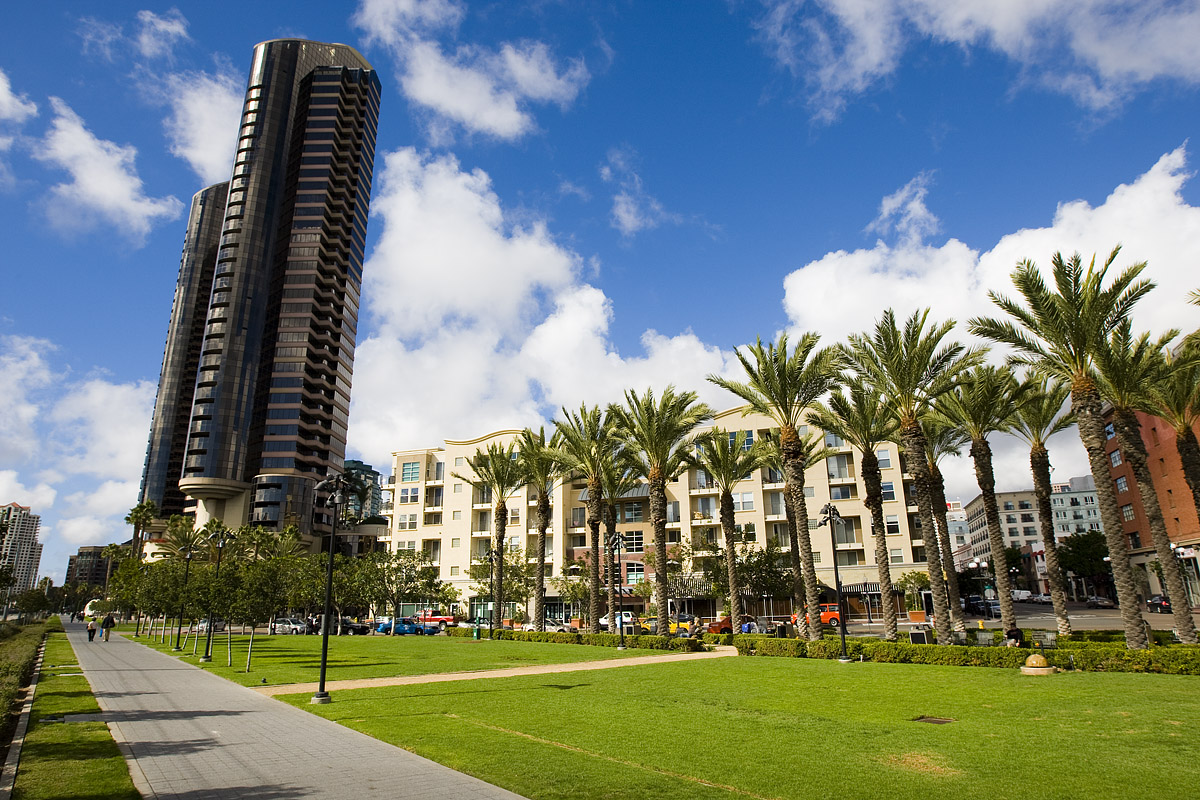
- The promenade in 2007
- Interactive map of Martin Luther King Jr. Promenade
- Type: Linear park
- Location: San Diego, California
- Coordinates: 32°42′32″N 117°09′48″W
- Area: 12-acre (4.9 ha)
- Created: 1992

Martin Luther King Jr. Promenade is a 12-acre (4.9 ha) linear park and memorial promenade in San Diego, California. Children's Park lies within the promenade. The promenade was dedicated in 1992.

== See also ==
- List of parks in San Diego
