= Children's Park (San Diego) =

Park in San Diego, California

Coordinates: 32°42′35″N 117°09′51″W

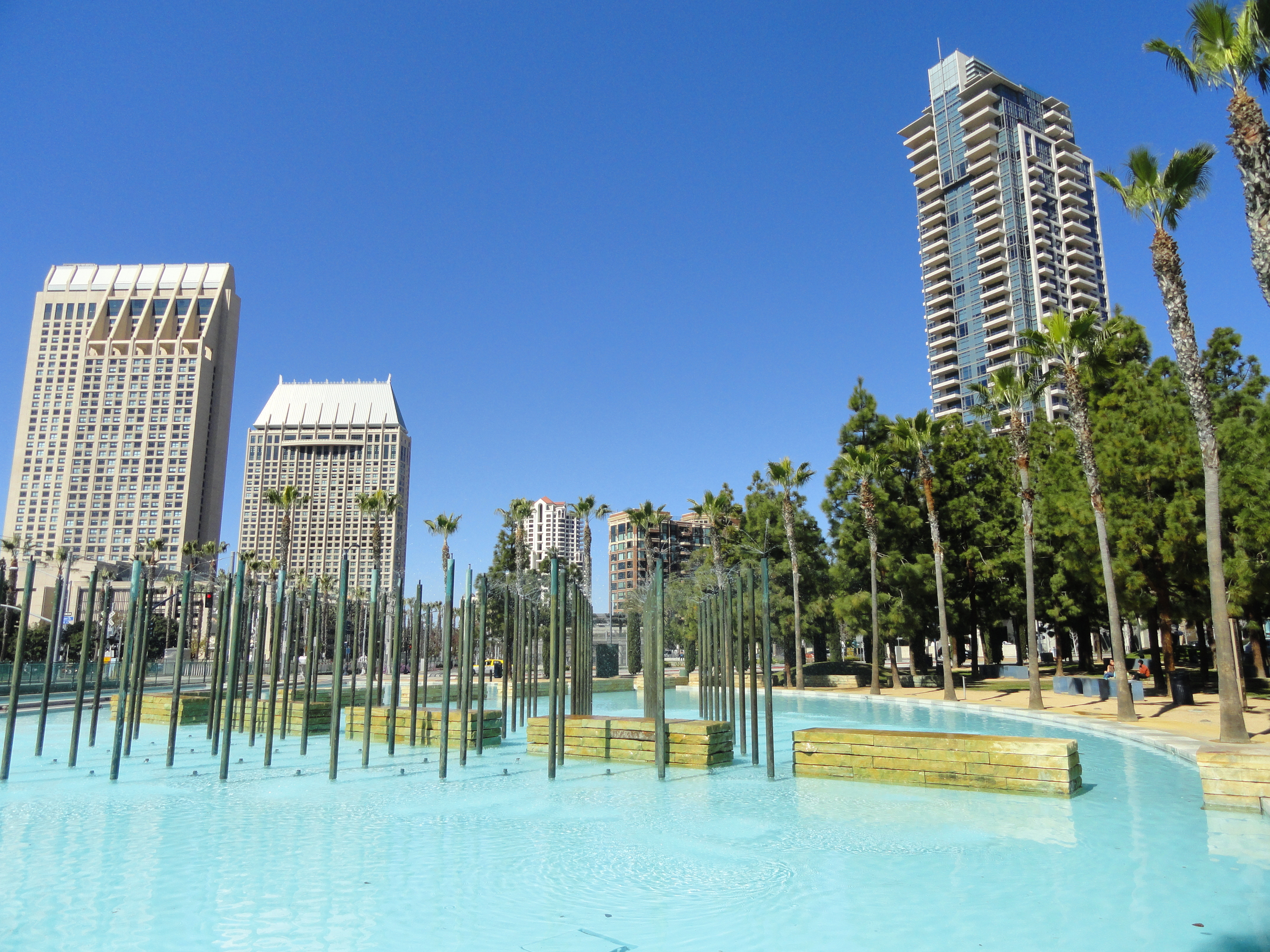
- The park's fountain in 2013
- Interactive map of Children's Park
- Location: San Diego, California, U.S.

Children's Park is a public park along Martin Luther King Jr. Promenade in San Diego, California. It was designed by landscape architect Peter Walker, and completed in August 1996 at a cost of $2.8 million.

== See also ==
- List of parks in San Diego
