= List of science-fiction authors =

Science fiction is a genre of speculative fiction that deals with imaginative, futuristic and scientific concepts. These concepts may include information technology and robotics, biological manipulations, space exploration, time travel, parallel universes, and extraterrestrial life. The genre often explores human responses to the consequences of projected or imagined scientific advances.

Science fiction is related to fantasy, horror, and superhero fiction, and it contains many subgenres. The genre's precise definition has long been disputed among authors, critics, scholars, and readers. Major subgenres include hard science fiction, which emphasizes scientific accuracy, and soft science fiction, which focuses on social sciences. Other notable subgenres are cyberpunk, which explores the interface between technology and society, climate fiction, which addresses environmental issues, and space opera, which emphasizes pure adventure in a universe in which space travel is common.

== A ==
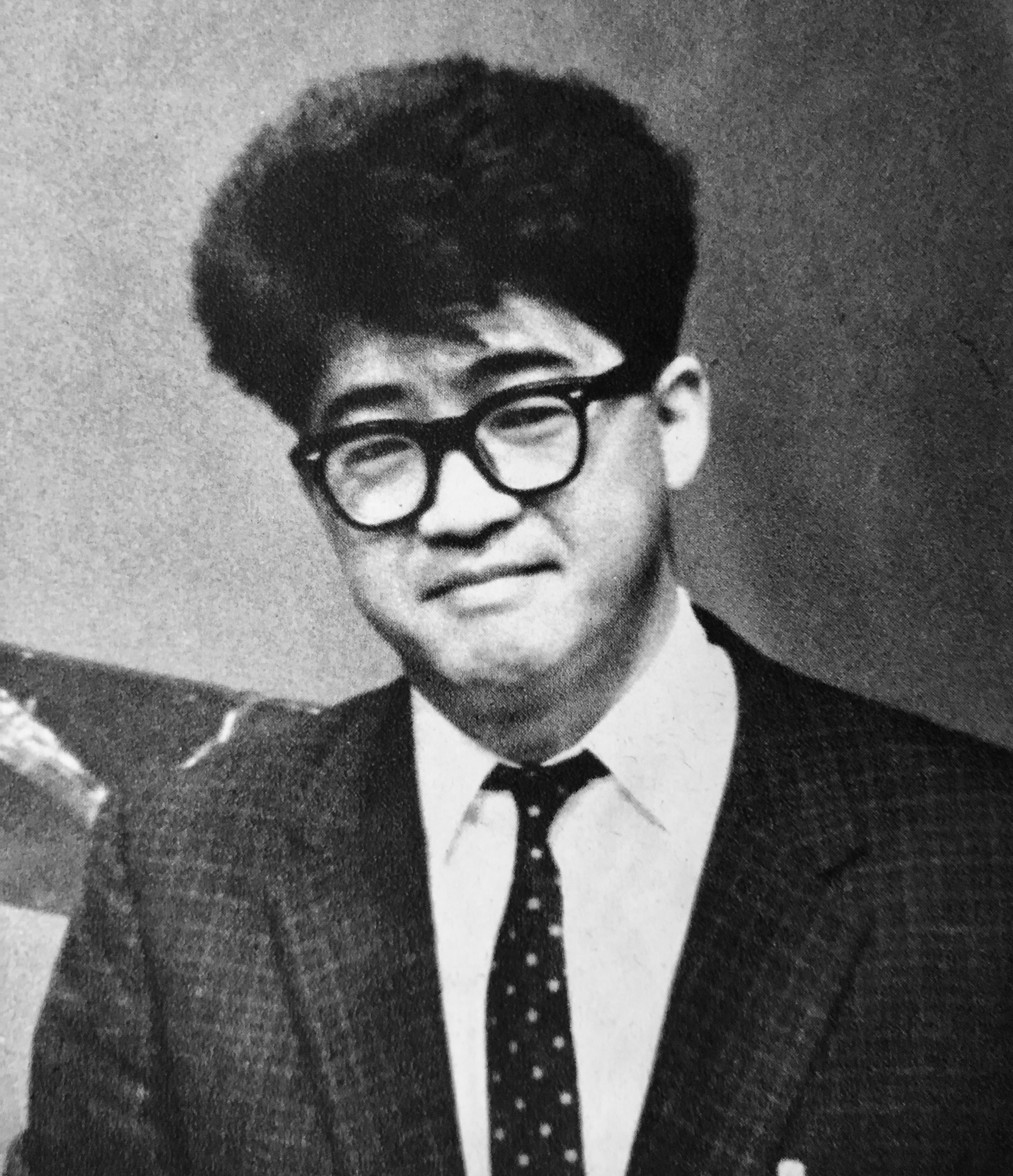
Kōbō Abe, 1967

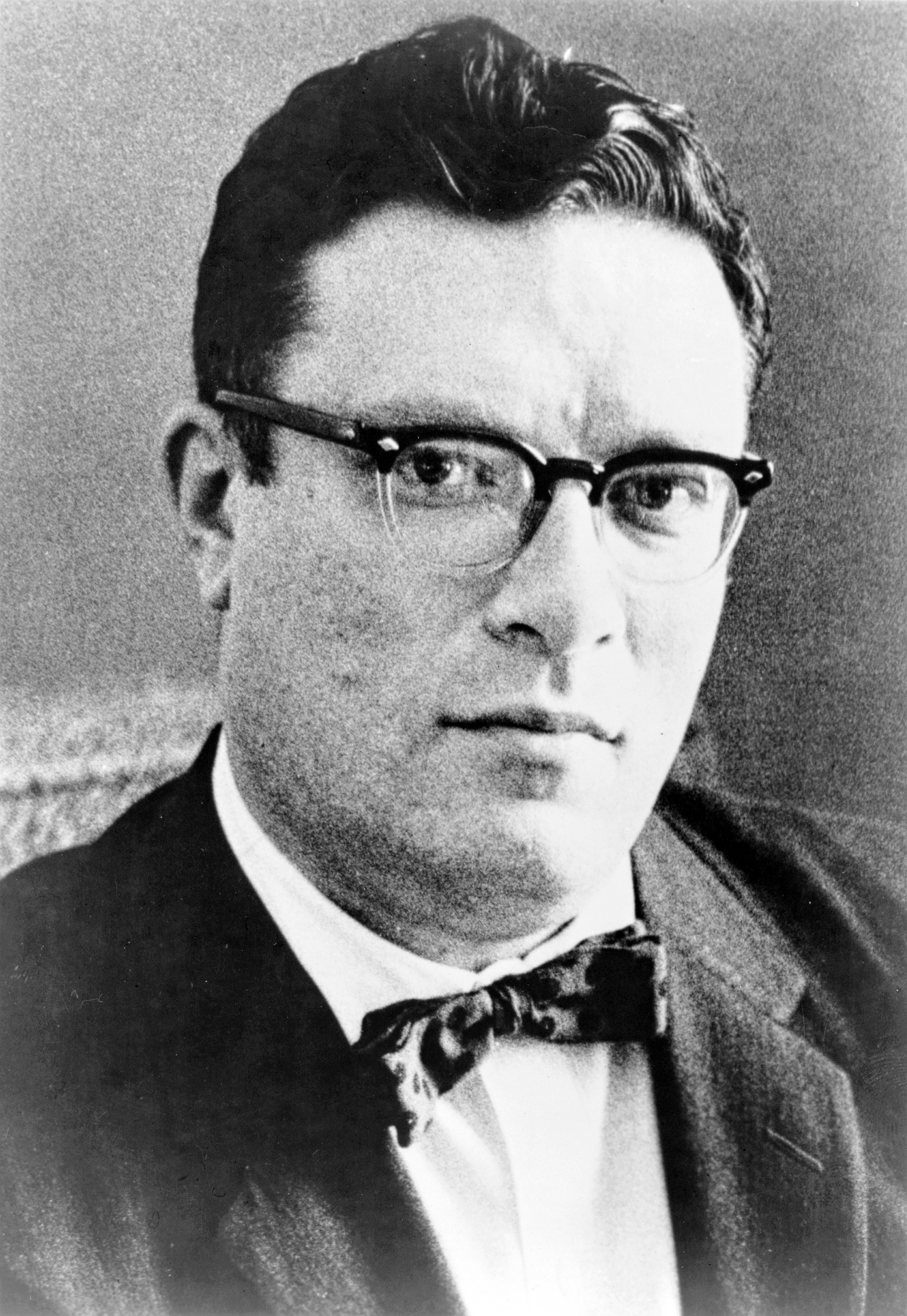
Isaac Asimov, before 1959

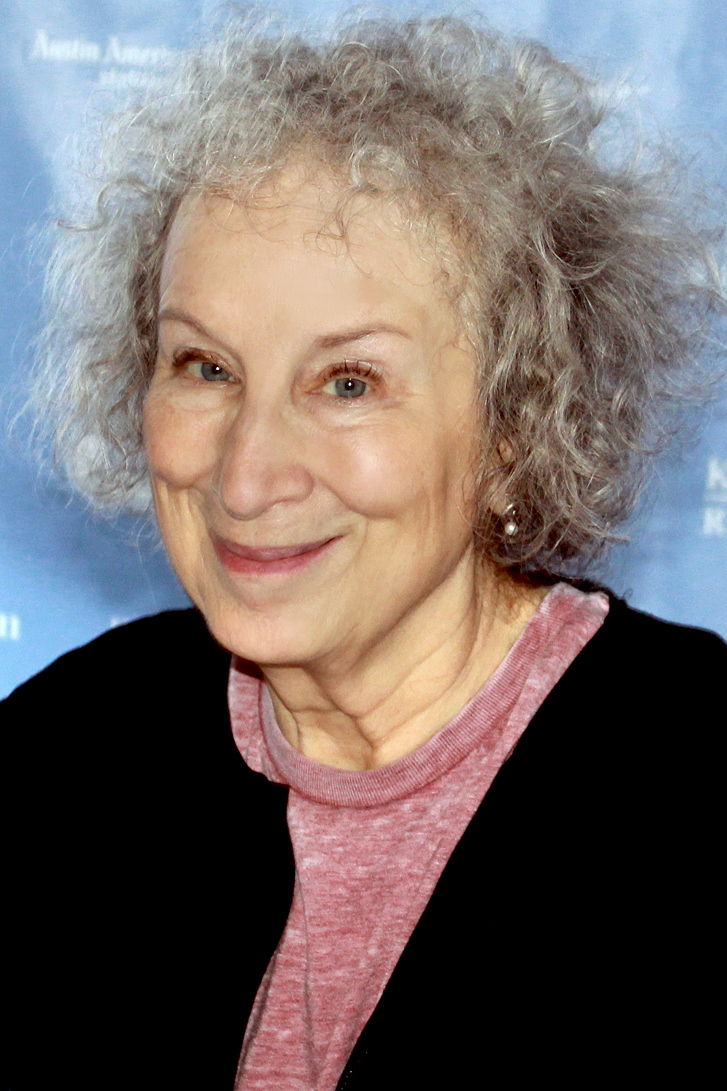
Margaret Atwood, 2015

- Dafydd ab Hugh (1960–2026)
- Alexander Abasheli (1884–1954)
- Edwin Abbott Abbott (1838–1926)
- Kōbō Abe (1924–1993)
- Robert Abernathy (1924–1990)
- Dan Abnett (born 1965)
- Daniel Abraham (born 1969)
- Forrest J Ackerman (1916–2008)
- Douglas Adams (1952–2001)
- Robert Adams (1932–1990)
- José Adolph (1933–2008)
- Ann Aguirre (born 1970)
- Jerry Ahern (1946–2012)
- Jim Aikin (born 1948)
- Alan Burt Akers (1921–2005) (pseudonym of Kenneth Bulmer)
- Tim Akers (born 1972)
- Brian Aldiss (1925–2017)
- David M. Alexander (born 1945)
- Grant Allen (1848–1899)
- Roger MacBride Allen (born 1957)
- Hans Joachim Alpers (1943–2011)
- Steve Alten (born 1959)
- Genrich Altshuller (1926–1998)
- Kingsley Amis (1922–1995)
- Paul Rafaelovich Amnuél (born 1944)
- Charlie Jane Anders (born 1969)
- Chester Anderson (1932–1991)
- Kevin J. Anderson (born 1962)
- Poul Anderson (1926–2001)
- Jean-Pierre Andrevon (born 1937)
- Arlan Andrews (born 1940)
- Patricia Anthony (1947–2013)
- Piers Anthony (born 1934)
- Christopher Anvil (1925–2009) (pseudonym of Harry C. Crosby)
- K. A. Applegate (born 1956)
- E.L. Arch (1922–1988) (pseudonym of Rachel Cosgrove Payes)
- Eleanor Arnason (born 1942)
- Robert Arthur (1909–1969)
- Catherine Asaro (born 1955)
- Neal Asher (born 1961)
- Francis Leslie Ashton (1904–1994)
- Pauline Ashwell (1928–2015)
- Isaac Asimov (1920–1992)
- Janet Asimov (1926–2019)
- Nancy Asire (1945–2021)
- Robert Asprin (1946–2008)
- Francis Henry Atkins (1847–1927)
- A. A. Attanasio (born 1951)
- Margaret Atwood (born 1939)
- Ayerdhal (1959–2015)

== B ==
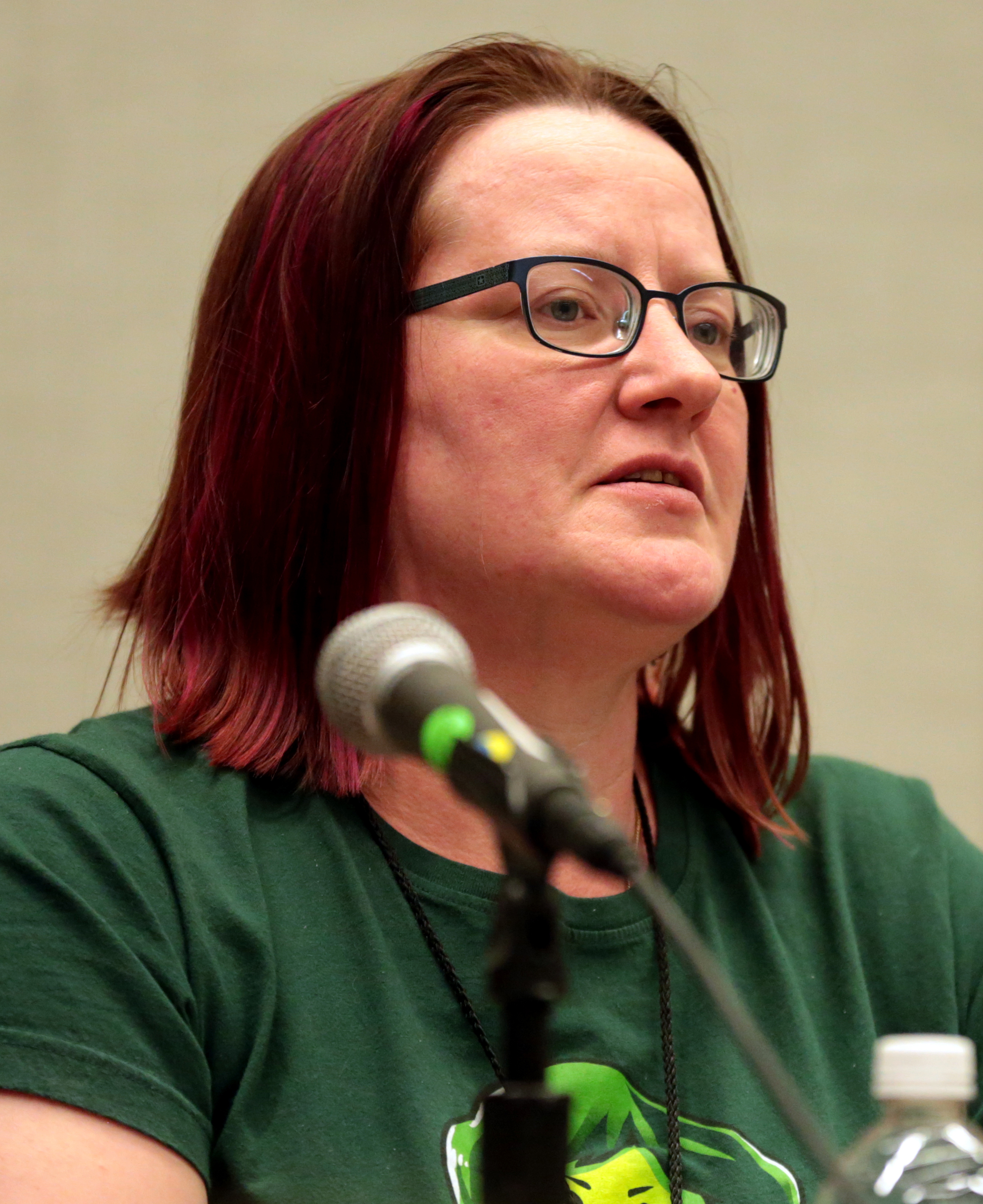
Elizabeth Bear, 2017

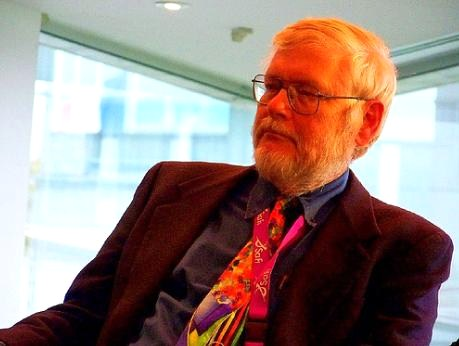
Gregory Benford, 2008

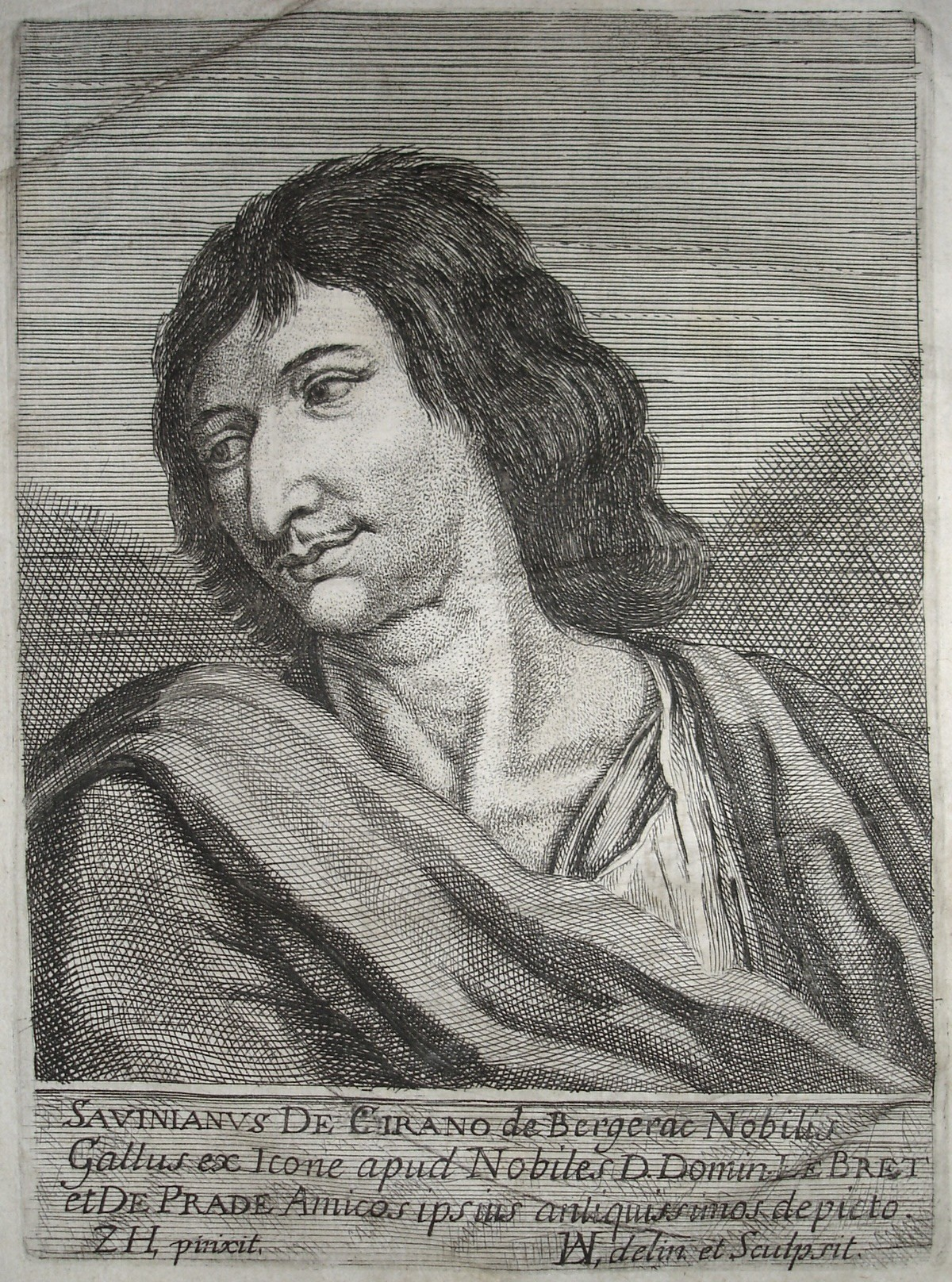
Cyrano de Bergerac, one of the earliest SF writers, ca. 1654

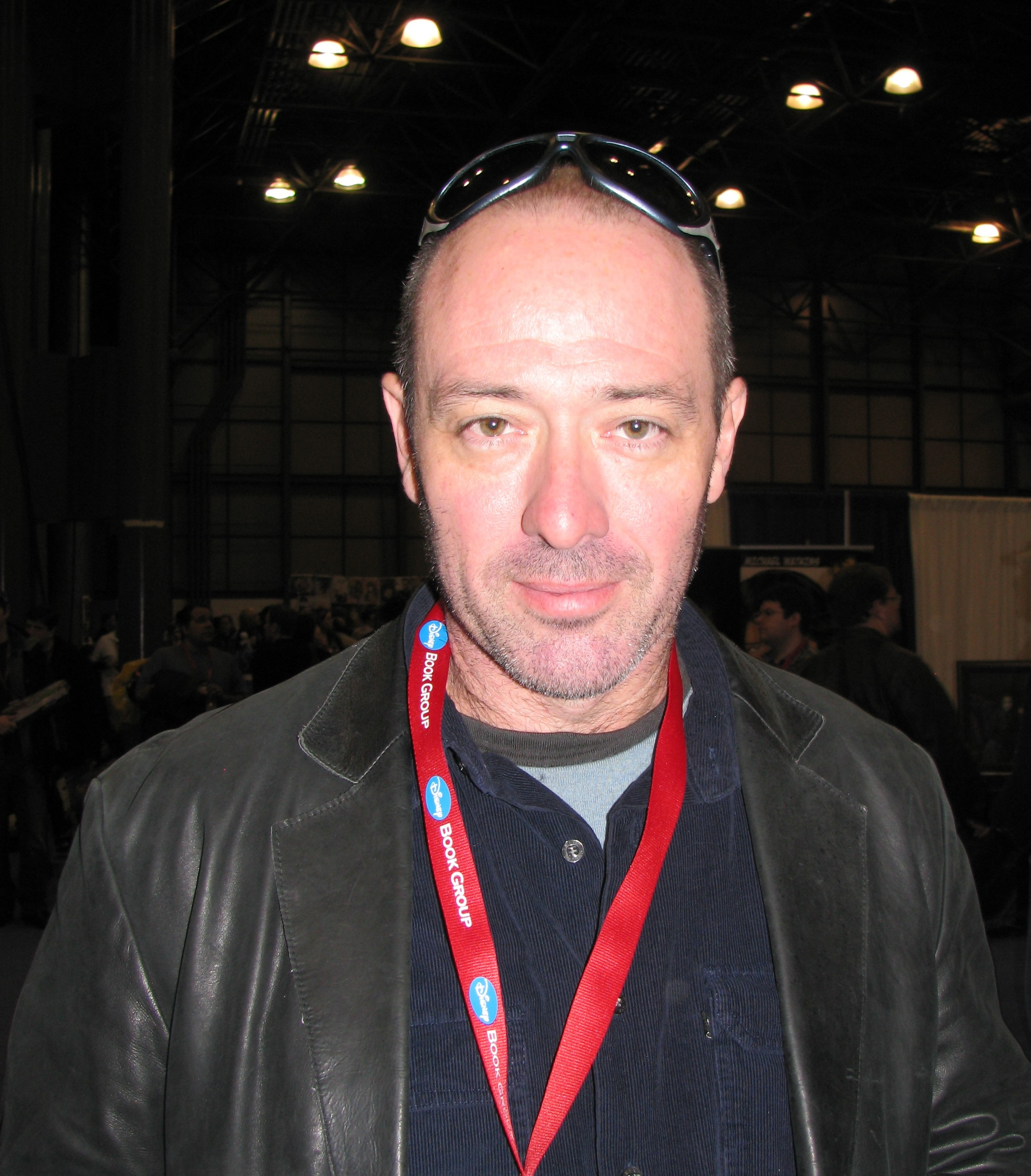
John Birmingham, 2009

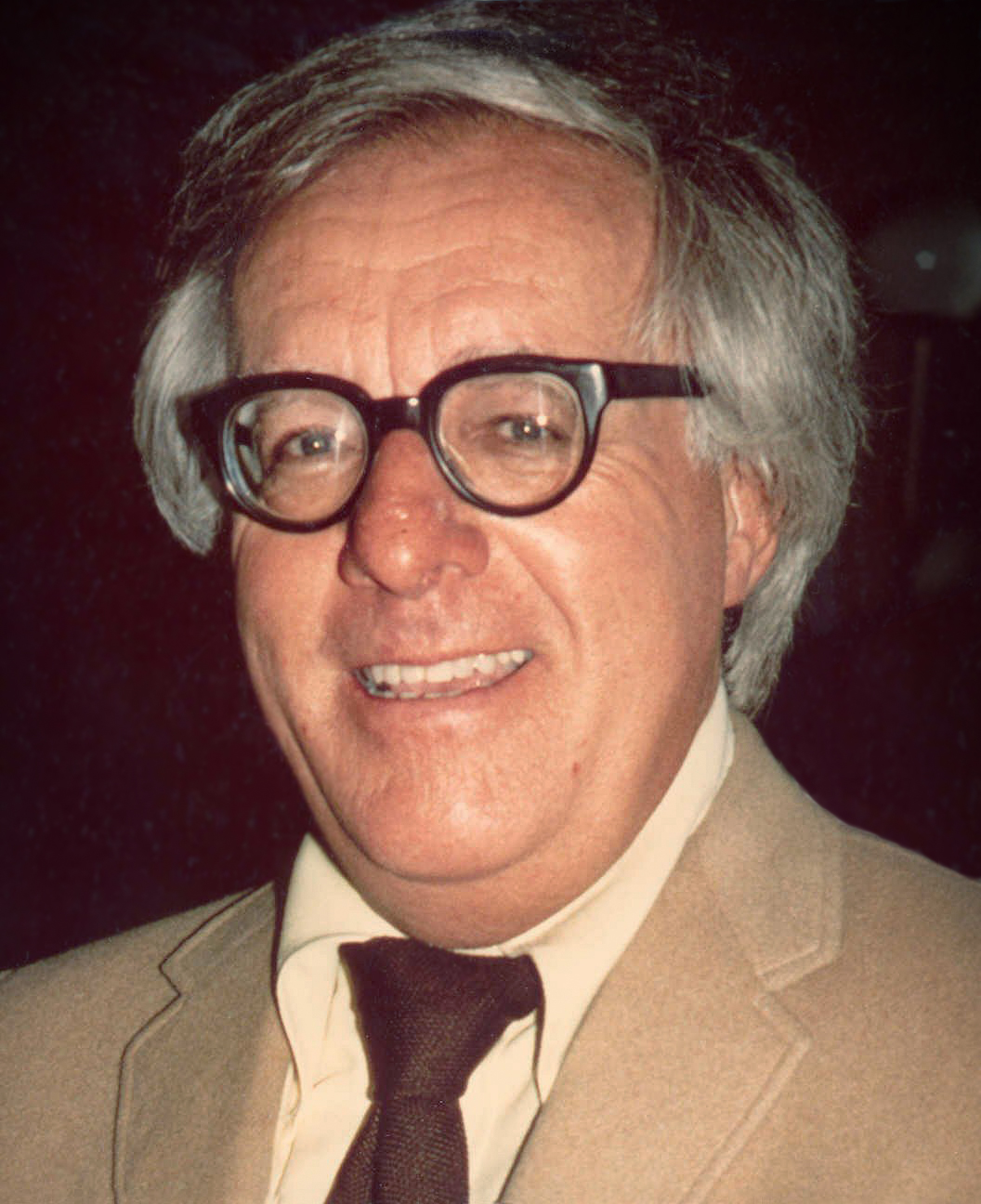
Ray Bradbury, 1975

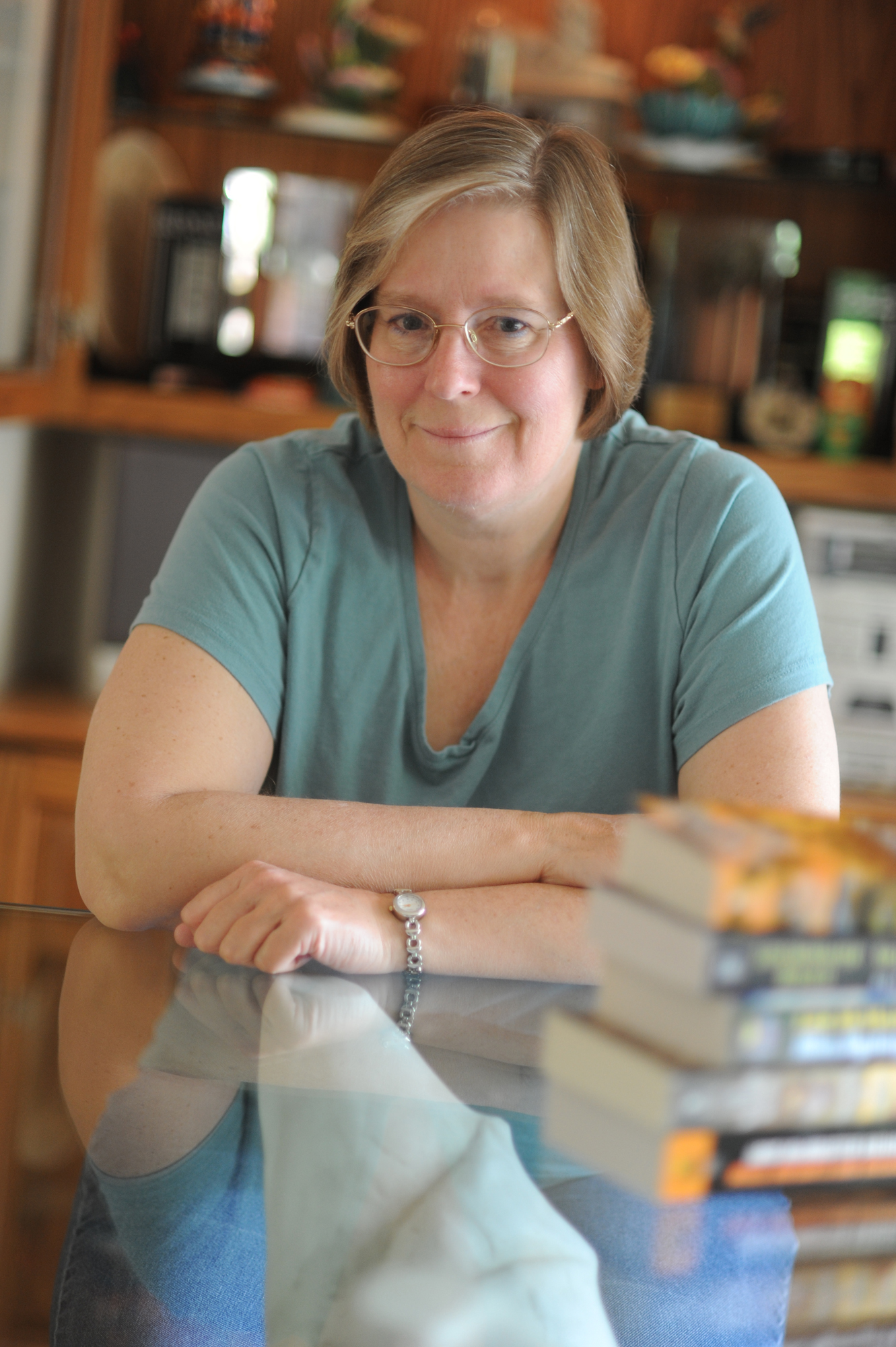
Lois McMaster Bujold, 2009

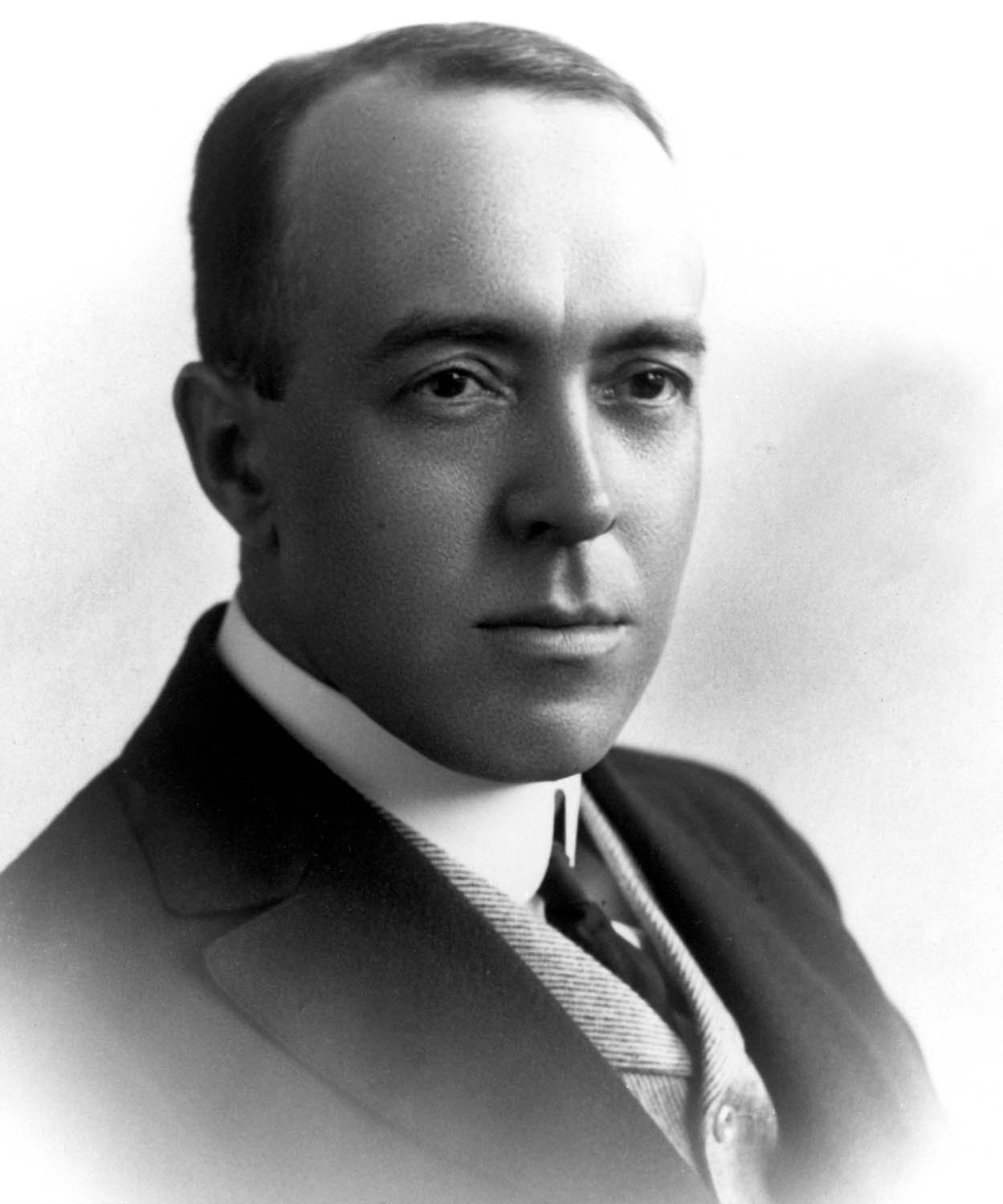
Edgar Rice Burroughs, c. 1920

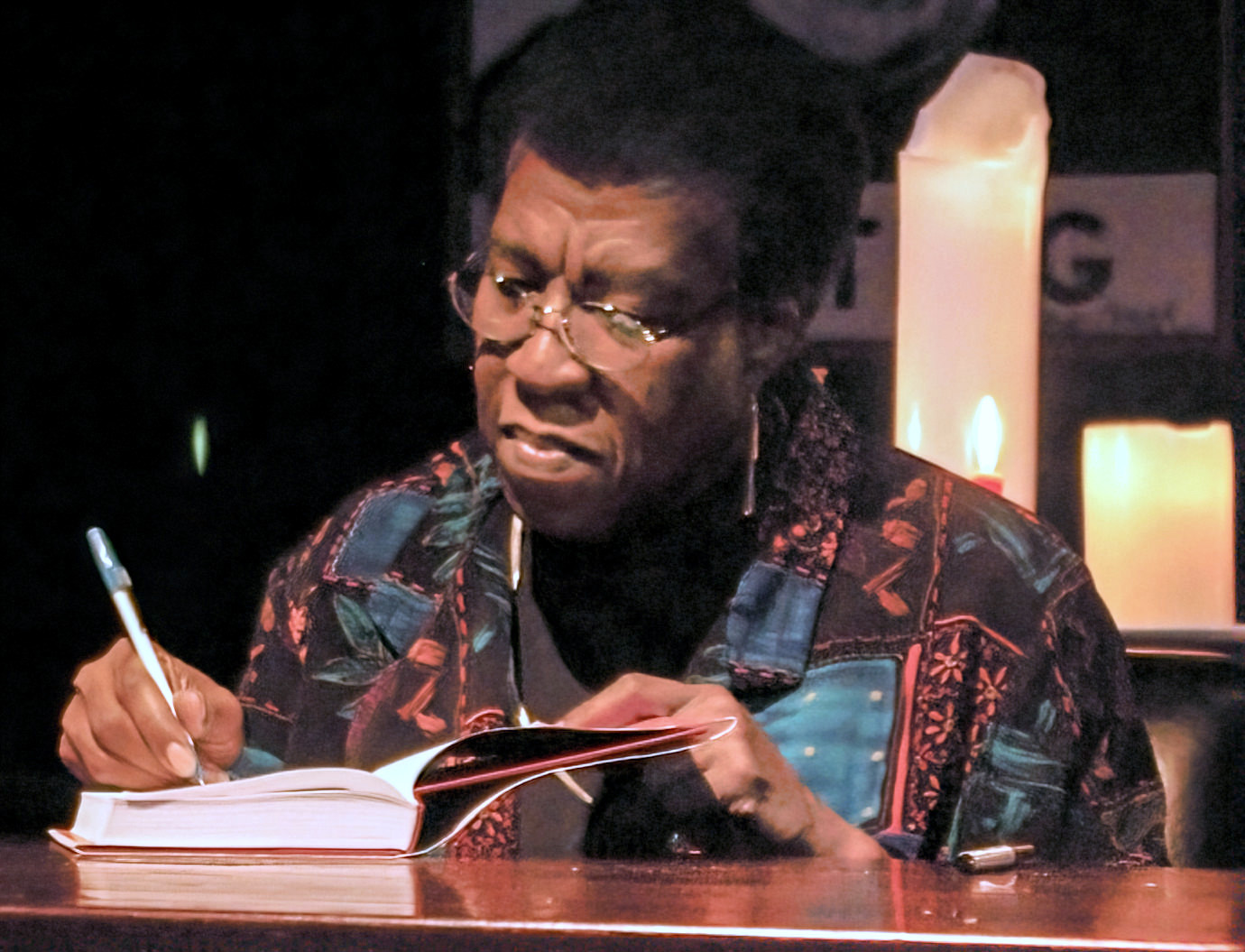
Octavia Butler, 2005

- Richard Bachman (pseudonym of Stephen King)
- Paolo Bacigalupi (born 1972)
- Hilary Bailey (1936–2017)
- Robin Wayne Bailey (born 1952)
- Kage Baker (1952–2010)
- Scott Baker (born 1947)
- J. G. Ballard (1930–2009)
- Edwin Balmer (1883–1959)
- Iain M. Banks (1954–2013)
- Michael A. Banks (1951–2023)
- Raymond E. Banks (1918–1996) (also known as Ray Banks, Ray E. Banks, R.E. Banks, and Fred Freair)
- Marek Baraniecki (born 1954)
- Miquel Barceló (1948–2021)
- René Barjavel (1911–1985)
- Wayne Barlowe (born 1958)
- Arthur K. Barnes (1911–1969)
- John Barnes (born 1957)
- Steven Barnes (born 1952)
- William Barnwell (born 1943)
- Donald Barr (1921–2004)
- João Barreiros (born 1952)
- Max Barry (born 1973)
- William Barton (born 1950)
- T. J. Bass (1932–2011) (pseudonym of Thomas J. Bassler)
- Harry Bates (1900–1981)
- L. Frank Baum (1856–1919)
- John Baxter (born 1939)
- Stephen Baxter (born 1957)
- Georgy Baydukov (1907–1994)
- Barrington J. Bayley (1937–2008)
- Elizabeth Bear (born 1971)
- Greg Bear (1951–2022)
- Jerome Beatty Jr (1918–2002)
- Charles Beaumont (1929–1967)
- Vladimir Beekman (1929–2009)
- Ugo Bellagamba (born 1972)
- Edward Bellamy (1850–1898)
- Alexander Belyaev (1884–1942)
- Andrei Belyanin (born 1967)
- Don Bendell (born 1947) (pseudonym of Ron Stillman)
- Gregory Benford (born 1941)
- Donald R. Bensen (1927–1997)
- J. D. Beresford (1873–1947)
- Fyodor Berezin (born 1960)
- Cyrano de Bergerac (1619–1655)
- Jack Bertin (1913–1983) (pseudonym of Peter B. Germano)
- Alfred Bester (1913–1987)
- Bruce Bethke (born 1955)
- Ambrose Bierce (1842 – c. 1914)
- Lloyd Biggle, Jr. (1923–2002)
- Eando Binder (joint pseudonym of Earl (1904–1966) and Otto (1911–1974) Binder)
- John Birmingham (born 1964)
- David Bischoff (1951–2018)
- Michael Bishop (1945–2023)
- Terry Bisson (1942–2024)
- Jerome Bixby (1923–1998)
- Malorie Blackman (born 1962)
- Jayme Lynn Blaschke (born 1969)
- James Blaylock (born 1950)
- James Blish (1921–1975)
- Robert Bloch (1917–1994)
- Alexander Bogdanov (1873–1928)
- Maya Kaathryn Bohnhoff (born 1954)
- Kevin Bokeili (1963–2014)
- John Boland (1913–1976)
- Nelson S. Bond (1908–2006)
- Pierre Bordage (born 1955)
- François Bordes (1919–1981)
- Anthony Boucher (1911–1968) (pseudonym of William A.P. White)
- Pierre Boulle (1912–1994)
- Sydney James Bounds (1920–2006)
- Louis Henri Boussenard (1847–1910)
- Ben Bova (1932–2020)
- Leigh Brackett (1915–1978)
- Ray Bradbury (1920–2012)
- Marion Zimmer Bradley (1930–1999)
- Gillian Bradshaw (born 1956)
- Johanna Braun (1929–2008)
- Mark Brandis (1931–2000)
- Reginald Bretnor (1911–1992)
- Miles J. Breuer (1889–1945)
- David Brin (born 1950)
- Jason V Brock (born 1970)
- Damien Broderick (1944–2025)
- Max Brooks (born 1972)
- Terry Brooks (born 1944)
- John Brosnan (1947–2005)
- Eric Brown (born 1960)
- Fredric Brown (1906–1972)
- James Cooke Brown (1921–2000)
- Rosel George Brown (1926–1967)
- Simon Brown (born 1956)
- John Brunner (1934–1995)
- Steven Brust (born 1955)
- Edward Bryant (1945–2017)
- Valery Bryusov (1873–1924)
- Tobias S. Buckell (born 1979)
- Algis Budrys (1931–2008)
- Vitaly Bugrov (1938–1994)
- Lela E. Buis (fl. 1977–present)
- Lois McMaster Bujold (born 1949)
- Mikhail Bulgakov (1891–1940)
- Faddey Bulgarin (1789–1859)
- Kenneth Bulmer (1921–2005)
- Kir Bulychev (1934–2003)
- Chris Bunch (1943–2005)
- David R. Bunch (1925–2000)
- Anthony Burgess (1917–1993)
- Sue Burke (born 1955)
- Yuli Burkin (born 1960)
- Arthur J. Burks (1898–1974)
- Edgar Rice Burroughs (1875–1950)
- Michael A. Burstein (born 1970)
- F. M. Busby (1921–2005)
- Aleksandr Bushkov (1956–2025)
- Jim Butcher (born 1971)
- Octavia E. Butler (1947–2006)
- Stuart J. Byrne (1913–2011)

== C ==
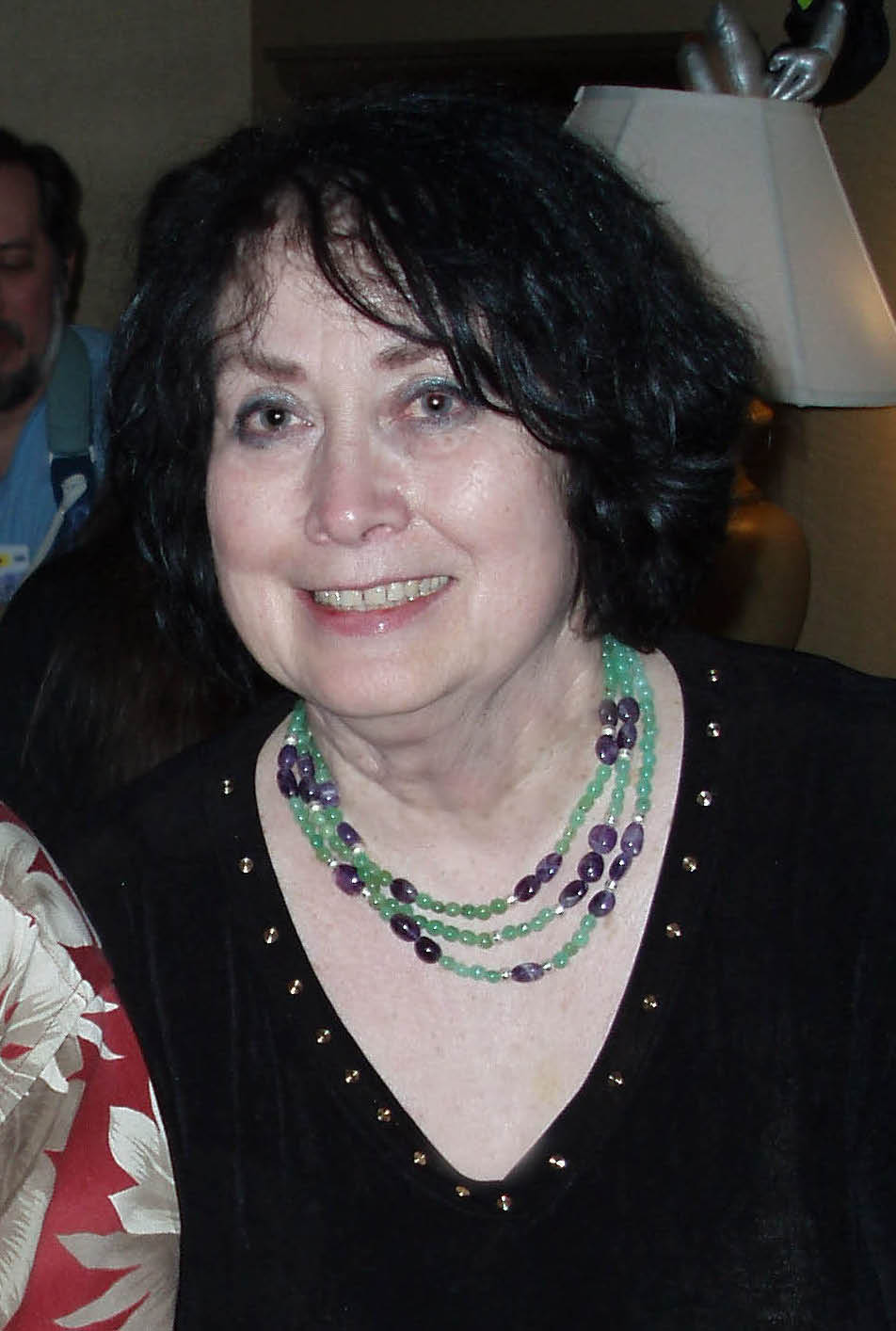
C. J. Cherryh, 2006

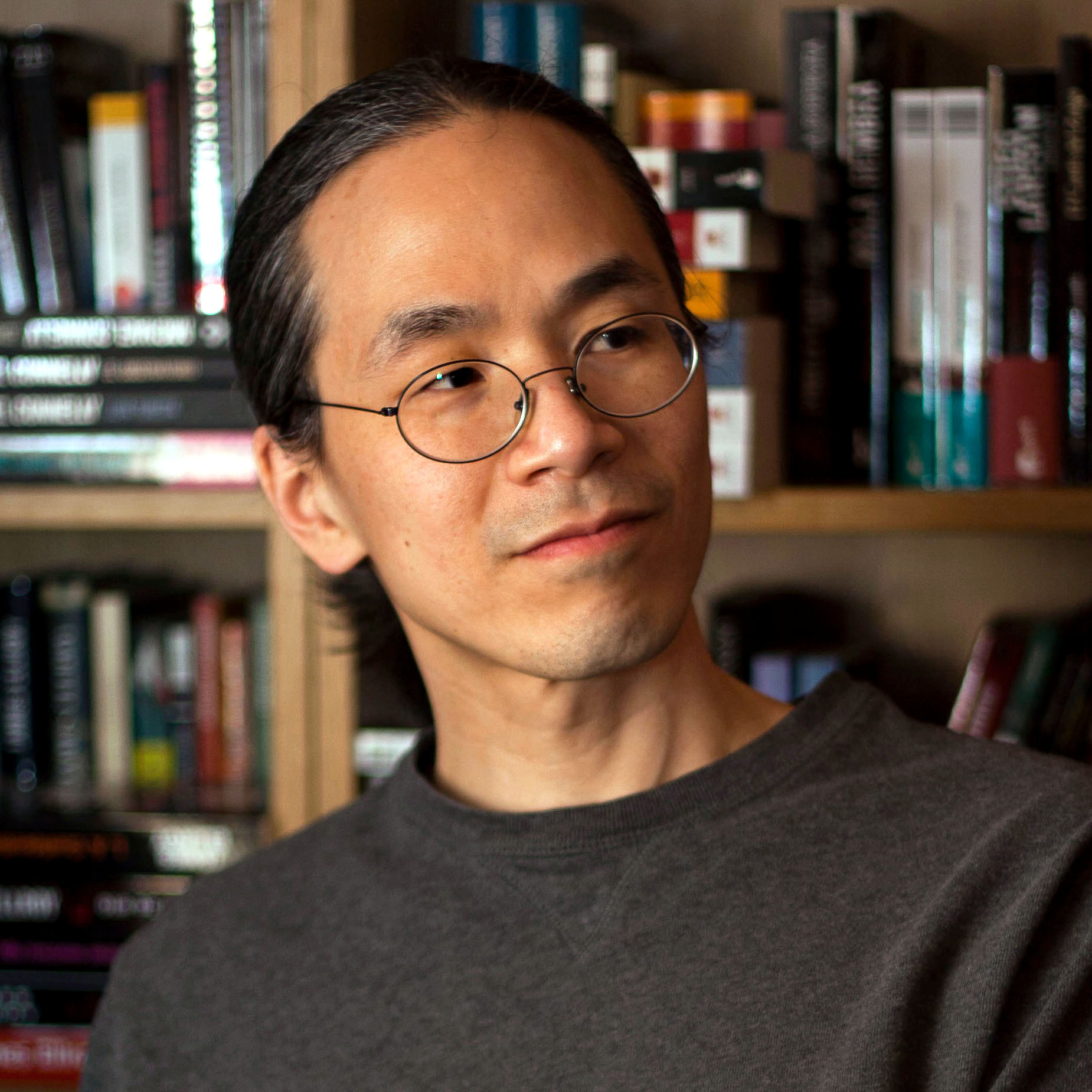
Ted Chiang, 2011

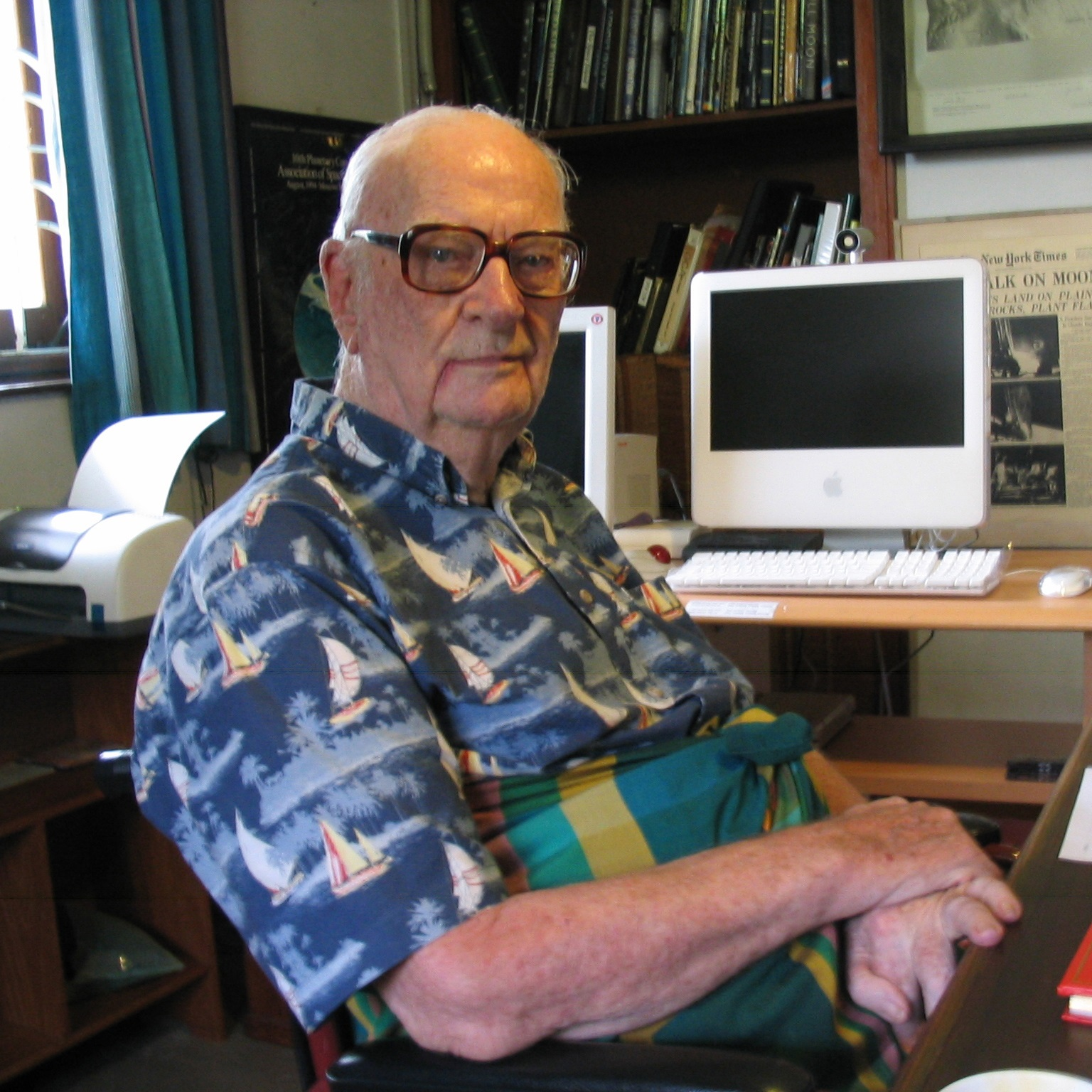
Arthur C. Clarke, ca. 2005

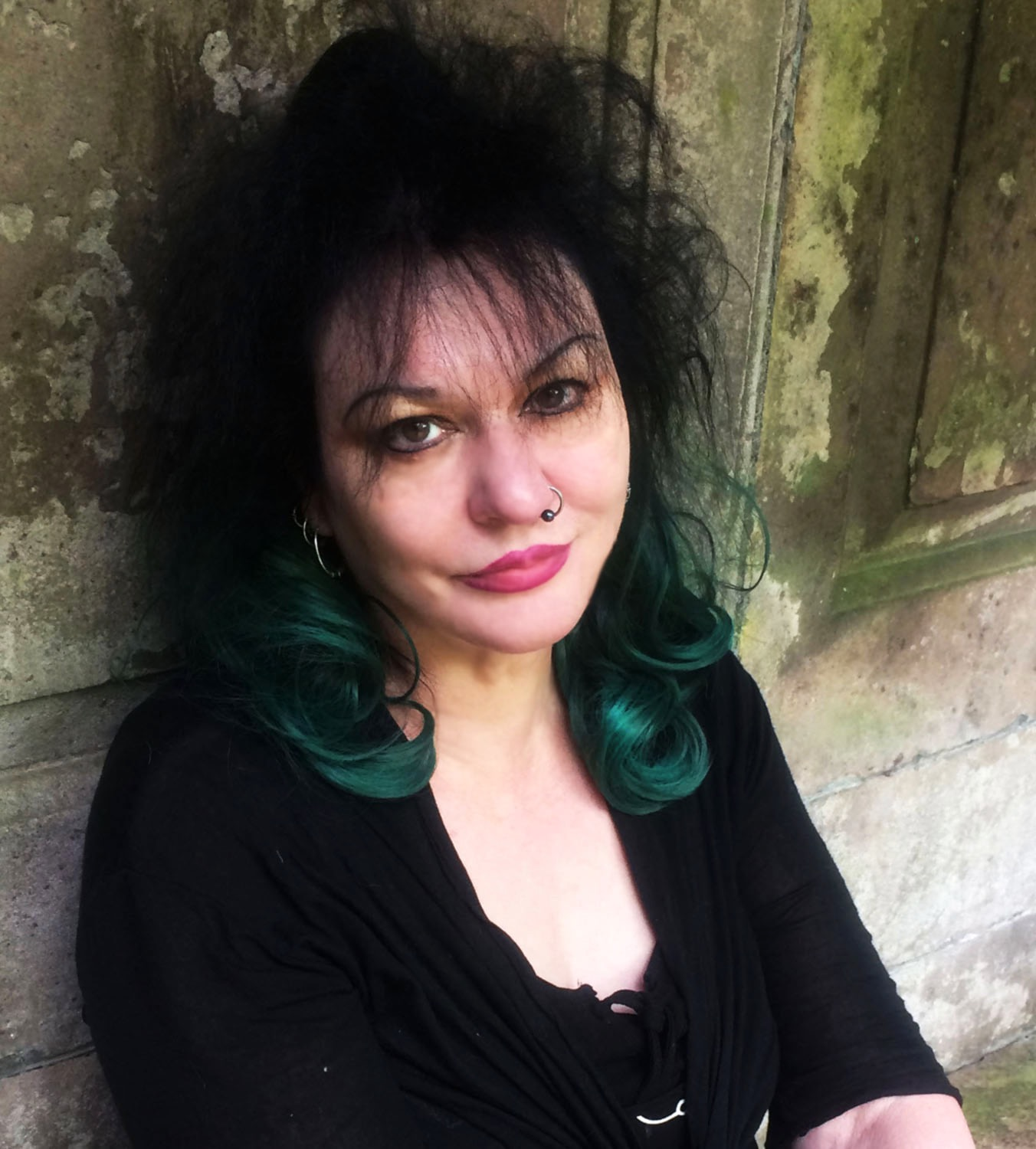
Storm Constantine 2016

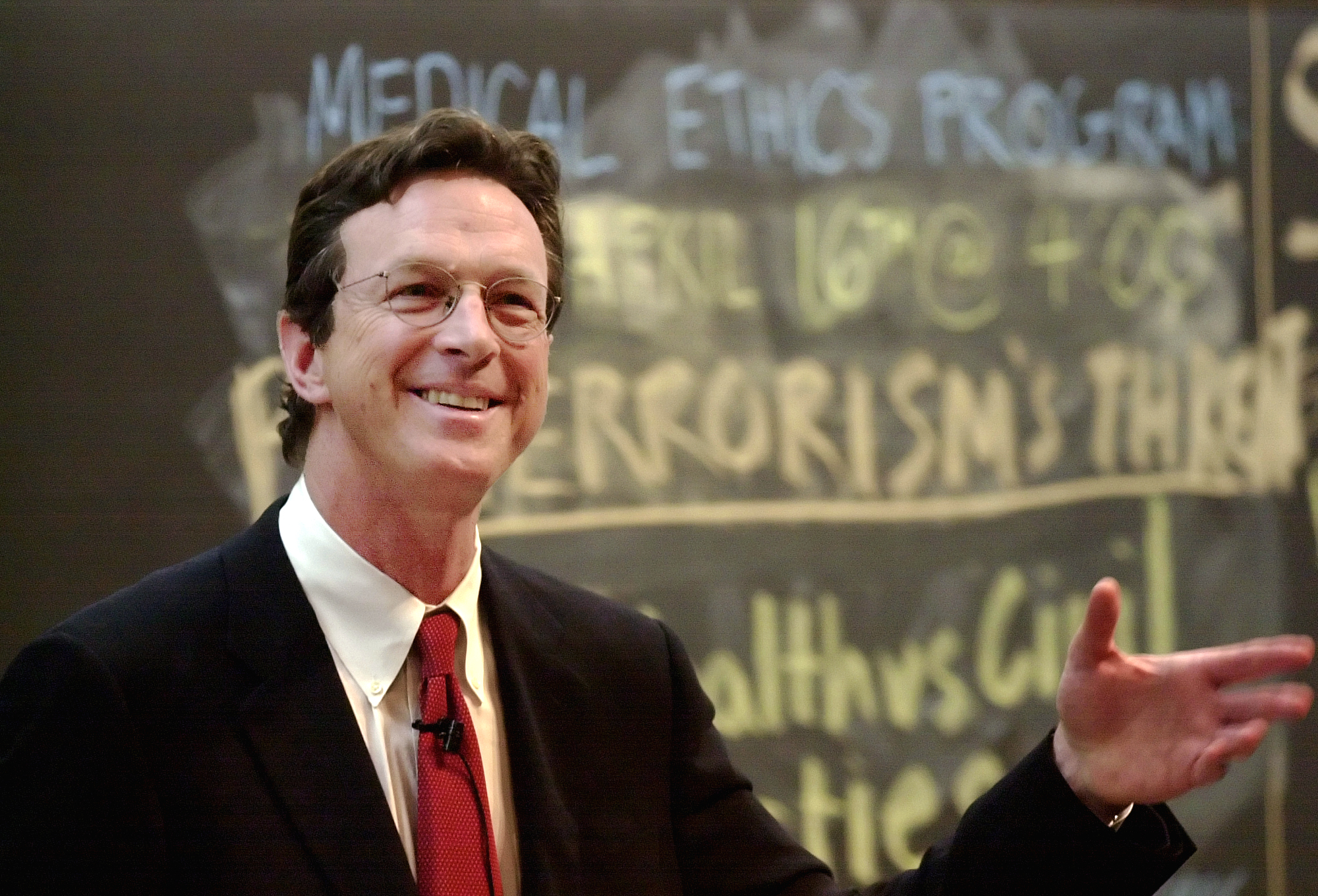
Michael Crichton, 2002

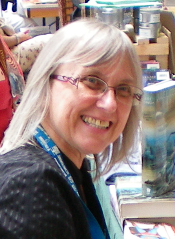
Julie Czerneda 2012

- Pat Cadigan (born 1953)
- Jack Cady (1932–2004)
- Martin Caidin (1927–1997)
- Italo Calvino (1923–1985)
- Jack Campbell (born 1956)
- John W. Campbell, Jr. (1910–1971) (also known as Don A. Stuart)
- Karel Čapek (1890–1938)
- Paul Capon (1912–1969)
- Orson Scott Card (born 1951)
- Joseph Carne-Ross (1846–1911)
- Terry Carr (1937–1987)
- Lin Carter (1930–1988)
- Cleve Cartmill (1908–1964)
- Jeffrey Carver (1949–2026)
- Jay Caselberg (born 1958)
- Beth Cato (born 1980)
- Hugh B. Cave (1910–2004)
- Franci Cerar (fl. 1979)
- Jack L. Chalker (1944–2005)
- Becky Chambers (born 1985)
- Joël Champetier (1957–2015)
- A. Bertram Chandler (1912–1984)
- Suzy McKee Charnas (1939–2023)
- Daína Chaviano (born 1960)
- J. Kathleen Cheney (born 1964)
- C. J. Cherryh (born 1942)
- Ted Chiang (born 1967)
- Charles Chilton (1917–2013)
- Nadia Chonville (born 1989)
- John Christopher (1922–2012) (pseudonym of Samuel Youd)
- Richard Chwedyk (born 1955)
- Massimo Citi (born 1955)
- Charles Heber Clark (1841–1915) (also known as Max Adeler and John Quill)
- Arthur C. Clarke (1917–2008)
- Jo Clayton (1939–1998)
- Hal Clement (1922–2003) (pseudonym of Harry Clement Stubbs)
- John Cleve (1934–2013) (pseudonym of Andrew J. Offutt)
- Mark Clifton (1906–1963)
- Ernest Cline (born 1972)
- Mildred Clingerman (1918–1997)
- Brenda Clough (born 1955)
- Martha deMey Clow (1932–2010)
- John Clute (born 1940)
- Stanton A. Coblentz (1896–1982)
- Theodore Cogswell (1918–1987)
- Frona Eunice Wait Colburn (1859–1946)
- Allan Cole (1943–2019)
- Robert William Cole (1869–1937)
- Eoin Colfer (born 1965)
- Erroll Collins (1906–1991) (pseudonym of Ellen Edith Hannah Redknap)
- Suzanne Collins (born 1962)
- D. G. Compton (1930–2023)
- Michael Coney (1932–2005)
- Groff Conklin (1904–1968)
- Storm Constantine (1956–2021)
- Glen Cook (born 1944)
- Hugh Cook (1956–2008)
- Paul Cook (born 1950)
- Rick Cook (1944–2022)
- Brenda Cooper (born 1960)
- Edmund Cooper (1926–1982)
- Alfred Coppel (1921–2004)
- James S. A. Corey (joint pseudonym of Daniel Abraham and Ty Franck)
- Larry Correia (born 1977)
- Juanita Coulson (born 1933)
- Richard Cowper (1926–2002) (pseudonym John Middleton Murry, Jr. used when writing science fiction)
- Erle Cox (1873–1950)
- John G. Cramer (born 1934)
- Michael Crichton (1942–2008)
- Robert Cromie (1855–1907)
- John Crowley (born 1942)
- Andrew Crumey (born 1961)
- Ray Cummings (1887–1957)
- Philippe Curval (1929–2023)
- Julie E. Czerneda (born 1955)

== D ==
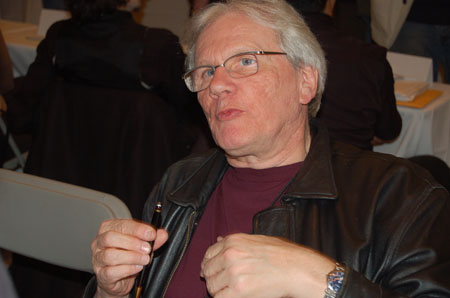
Jack Dann, 2007

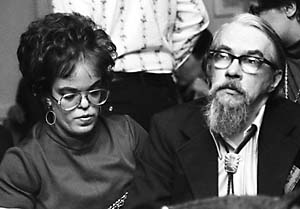
Judy Lynn and Lester Del Rey, 1974

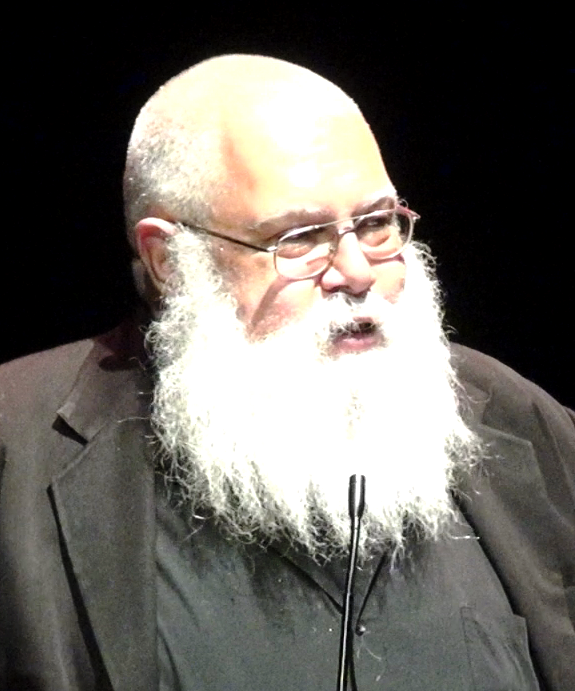
Samuel R. Delany, 2011

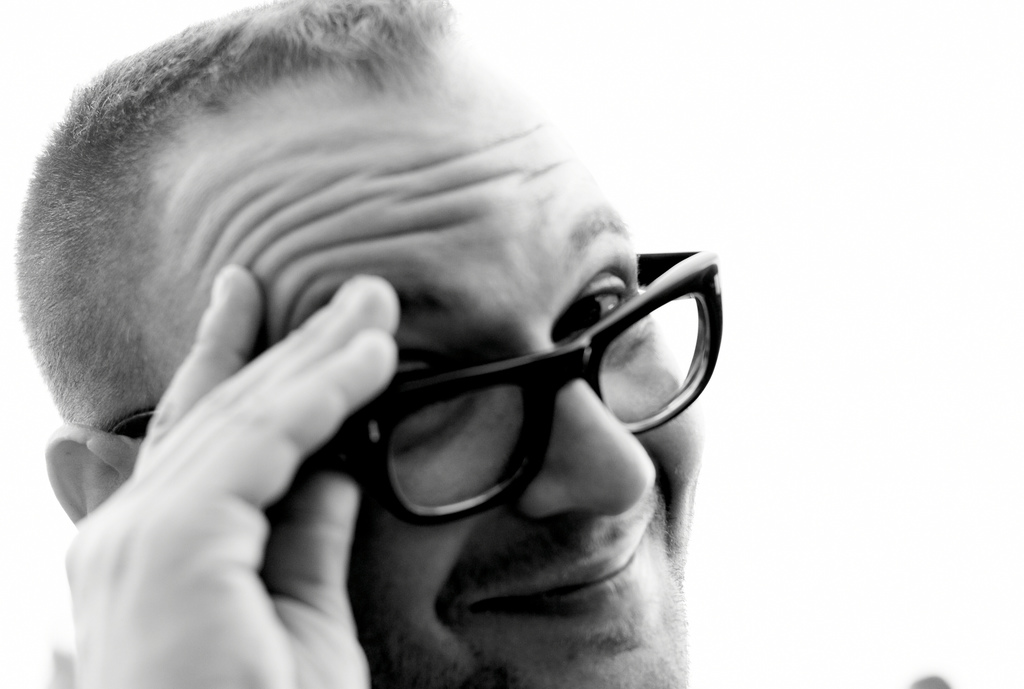
Cory Doctorow, 2007

- Roald Dahl (1916–1990)
- Brian Daley (1947–1996)
- John Dalmas (1926–2017)
- Tony Daniel (born 1963)
- Jack Dann (born 1945)
- Maurice Georges Dantec (1959–2016)
- Dennis Danvers (born 1947)
- Henry Darger (1892–1973)
- Clark Darlton (1920–2005) (pseudonym of Walter Ernsting)
- James Dashner (born 1972)
- Avram Davidson (1923–1993)
- Chan Davis (1926–2022) (pseudonym of Chandler Davis)
- Vox Day (born 1968)
- L. Sprague de Camp (1907–2000)
- Antonio de Macedo (1931–2017)
- James De Mille (1833–1880)
- Marianne de Pierres (born 1961)
- Stephen Dedman (born 1959)
- Miriam Allen deFord (1888–1975)
- Samuel R. Delany (born 1942)
- Bradley Denton (born 1958)
- Charles Derennes (1882–1930)
- August Derleth (1909–1971)
- A.J. Deutsch (1918–1969)
- Graham Diamond (born 1949)
- Philip K. Dick (1928–1982)
- Terrance Dicks (1935–2019)
- Gordon R. Dickson (1923–2001)
- Charles Willard Diffin (1884–1966)
- Lyuben Dilov (1927–2008)
- Dougal Dixon (born 1947)
- William C. Dietz (born 1945)
- Thomas M. Disch (1940–2008)
- Cory Doctorow (born 1971)
- Alfred Döblin (1878–1957)
- Stephen R. Donaldson (born 1947)
- Alain Dorémieux (1933–1998)
- Sonya Dorman (1924–2005)
- Candas Dorsey (born 1952)
- Ian Douglas (born 1950) (pseudonym of William H. Keith, Jr.)
- Terry Dowling (born 1947)
- Arthur Conan Doyle (1859–1930)
- Debra Doyle (1952–2020)
- Gardner Dozois (1947–2018)
- David Drake (1945–2023)
- Tananarive Due (born 1966)
- Catherine Dufour (born 1966)
- Jacek Dukaj (born 1974)
- Jean-Claude Dunyach (born 1957)
- Nictzin Dyalhis (1873–1942)

== E ==
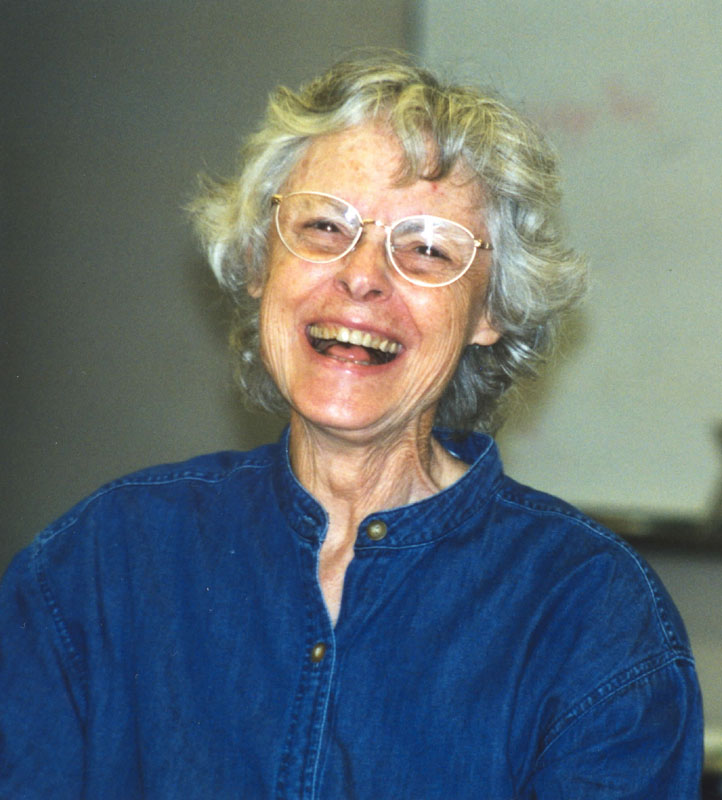
Carol Emshwiller, 1998

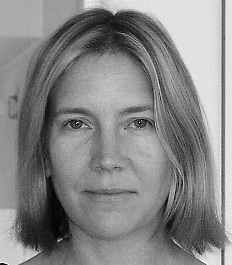
Kelley Eskridge, 2002

- C. M. Eddy, Jr. (1896–1967)
- G. C. Edmondson (1922–1995)
- George Alec Effinger (1947–2002)
- Ivan Antonovich Efremov (1907–1972) (in Russian Иван Антонович Ефремов)
- Greg Egan (born 1961)
- Phyllis Eisenstein (1946–2020)
- Gordon Eklund (born 1945)
- Suzette Haden Elgin (1936–2015)
- E. C. Eliott (1908–1971) (pseudonym of Reginald Alec Martin)
- William B. Ellern (1933–2023)
- Harlan Ellison (1934–2018)
- Roger Elwood (1933–2007)
- Victor Rousseau Emanuel (1879–1960)
- Carol Emshwiller (1921–2019)
- M. J. Engh (1933–2024)
- George Allan England (1877–1936)
- Inge Eriksen (1935–2015)
- Steven Erikson (born 1959) pseudonym of Steve Rune Lundin
- Walter Ernsting (1920–2005)
- Andreas Eschbach (born 1959)
- Kelley Eskridge (born 1960)
- Valerio Evangelisti (1952–2022)
- Christopher Evans (born 1951)
- E. Everett Evans (1893–1958)

== F ==
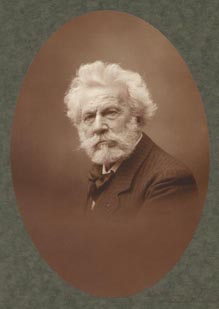
Camille Flammarion, date unknown

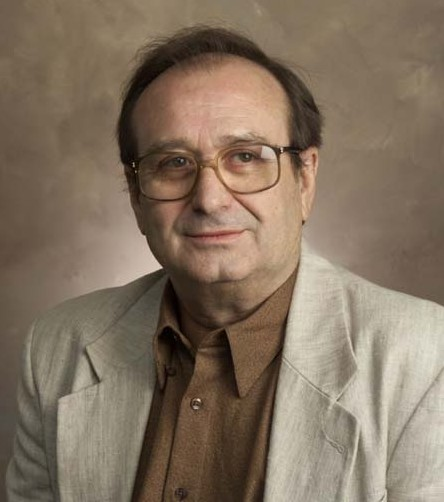
Eric Flint, ca. 2007

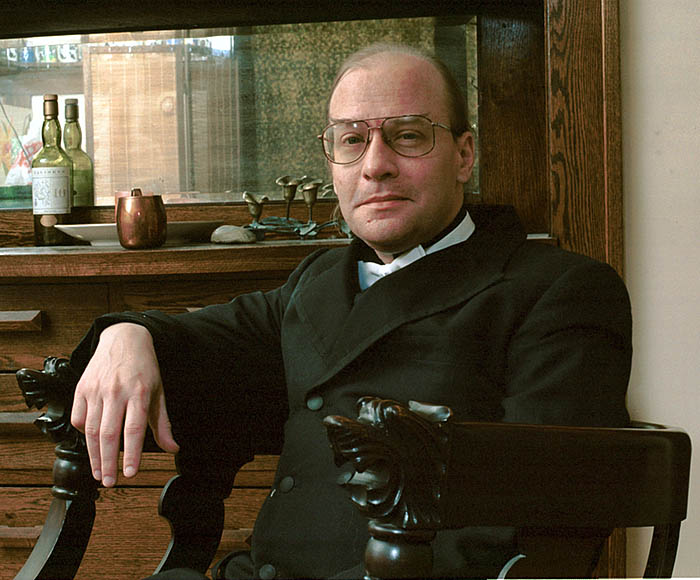
John M Ford, 2001

- Paul W. Fairman (1916–1977)
- Jane Fancher (born 1952)
- Lionel Fanthorpe (born 1935)
- Ralph Milne Farley (1887–1963) (pseudonym of Roger Sherman Hoar)
- Philip José Farmer (1918–2009)
- Nabil Farouk (1956–2020)
- Howard Fast (1914–2003)
- John Russell Fearn (1908–1960)
- Cynthia Felice (born 1942) ISFDB
- Brad Ferguson (born 1953)
- Paul Di Filippo (born 1954)
- Sheila Finch (born 1935)
- Jack Finney (1911–1995)
- Eliot Fintushel (born 1948)
- Nicholas Fisk (1923–2016) (pseudonym of David Higginbottom)
- Francis Flagg (1898–1946) (pseudonym of George Henry Weiss)
- Camille Flammarion (1842–1925)
- Eric Flint (1947–2022)
- Homer Eon Flint (1888–1924)
- Michael Flynn (1947–2023)
- Charles L. Fontenay (1917–2007)
- Jeffrey Ford (born 1955)
- John M. Ford (1957–2006)
- William R. Forstchen (born 1950)
- E. M. Forster (1879–1970)
- Robert L. Forward (1932–2002)
- Richard Foss (born 1956)
- Alan Dean Foster (born 1946)
- M. A. Foster (1939–2020)
- Karen Joy Fowler (born 1950)
- Gardner Fox (1911–1986)
- Randall Frakes (born 1947) ISFDB
- Leo Frankowski (1943–2008)
- Herbert W. Franke (1927–2022)
- Yves Fremion (born 1940)
- C. S. Friedman (born 1957)
- Oscar J. Friend (1897–1963)
- Esther Friesner (born 1951)

== G ==
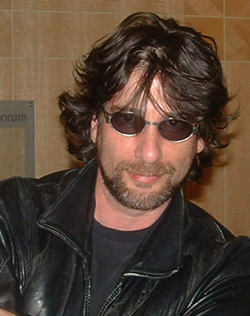
Neil Gaiman, 2004

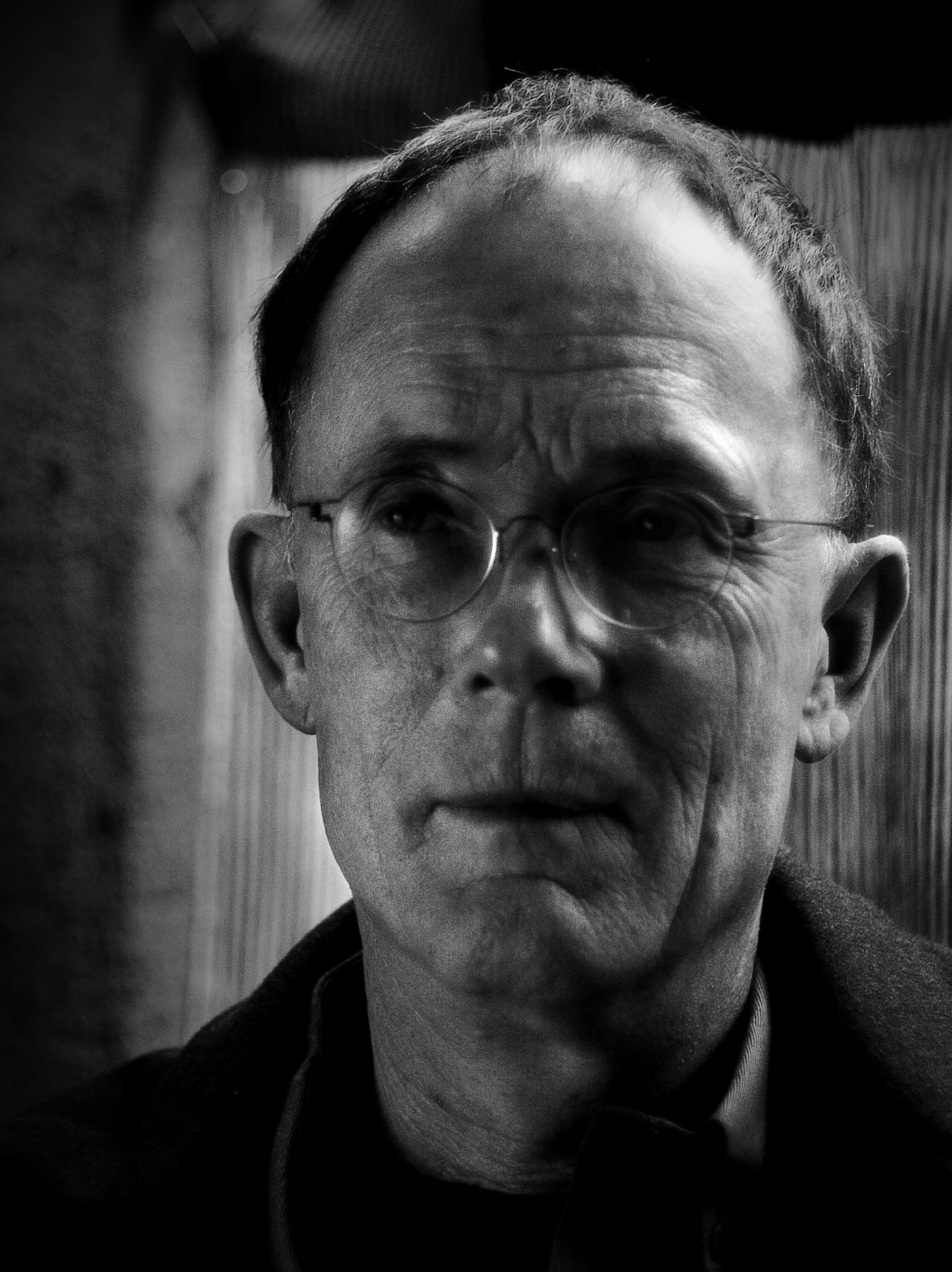
William Gibson, 2008

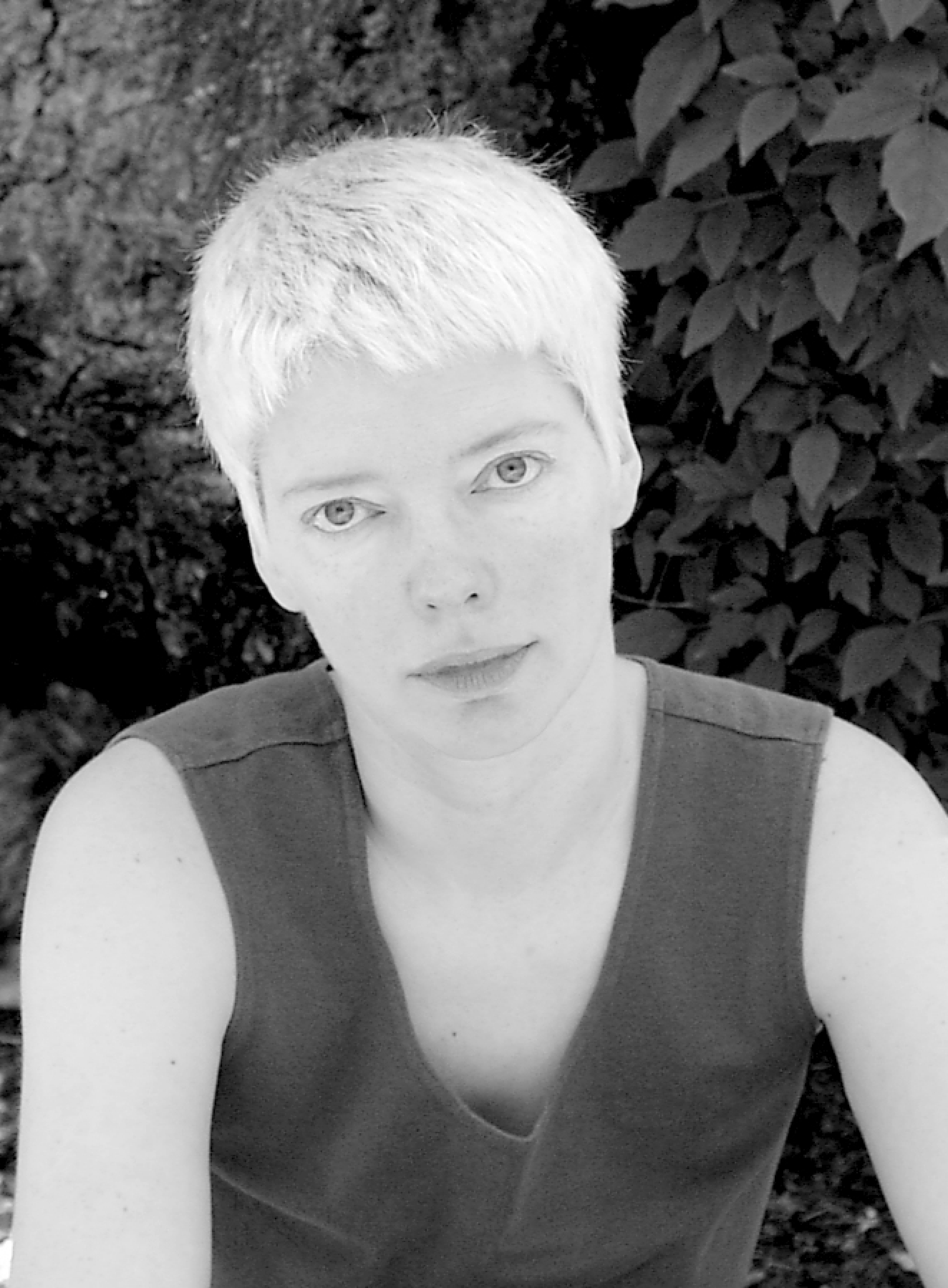
Nicola Griffith, 2007

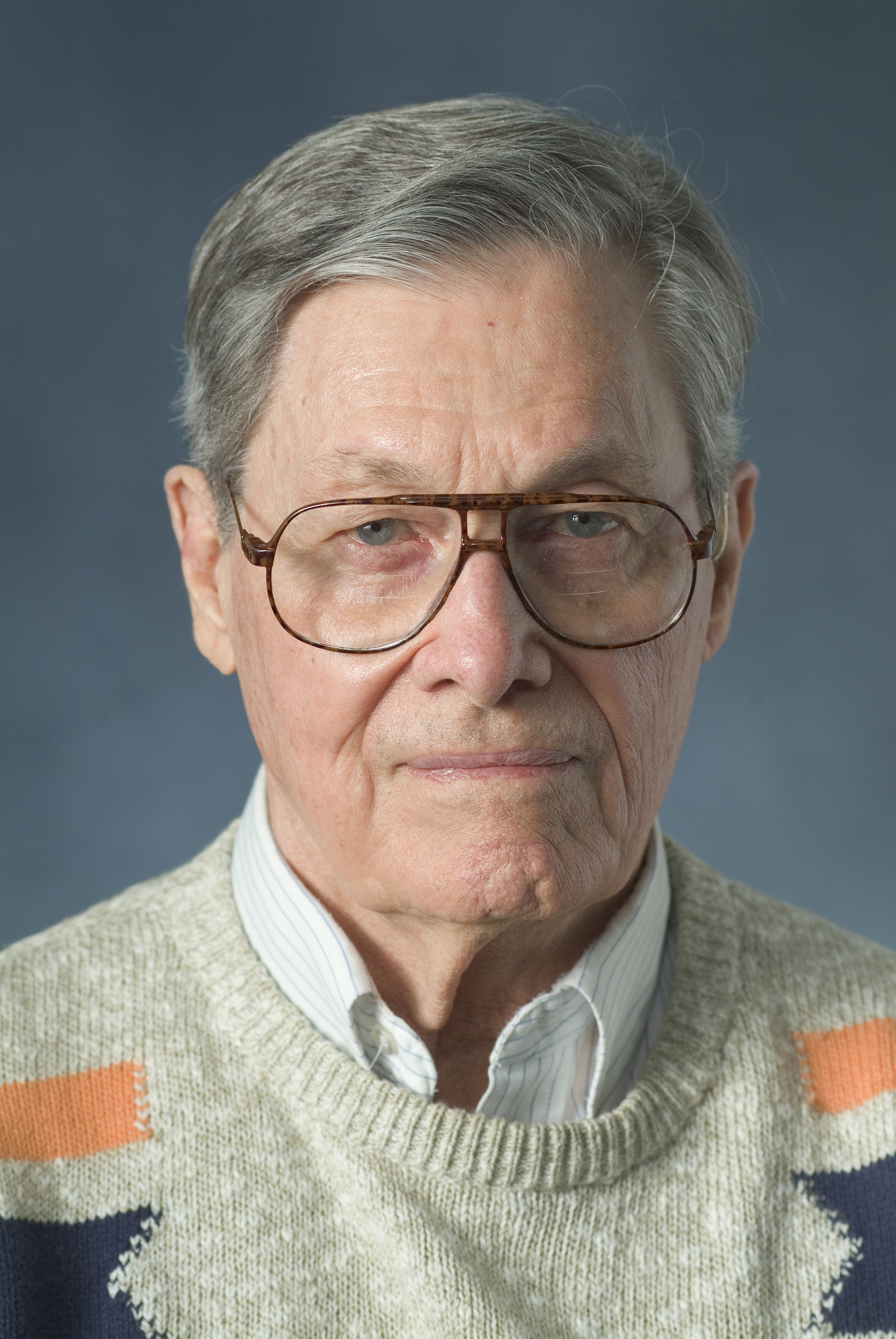
James Gunn, ca. 2007

- Neil Gaiman (born 1960)
- Raymond Z. Gallun (1911–1994)
- Arnould Galopin (1865–1934)
- Daniel F. Galouye (1920–1976)
- Charles E. Gannon (born 1960)
- James Alan Gardner (born 1955)
- Martin Gardner (1914–2010)
- Richard Garfinkle (born 1961)
- Randall Garrett (1927–1987)
- Laurent Genefort (born 1968)
- Mary Gentle (born 1956)
- Peter George (1924–1966)
- Hugo Gernsback (1884–1967) (namesake of the Hugo Award)
- David Gerrold (born 1944)
- Mark S. Geston (born 1946)
- Edward Gibson (born 1936)
- Gary Gibson (born 1965)
- William Gibson (born 1948)
- John Ulrich Giesy (1877–1947)
- Alexis A. Gilliland (born 1931)
- John Glasby (1928–2011)
- John Gloag (1896–1981)
- Molly Gloss (born 1944)
- Dmitry Glukhovsky (born 1979)
- Parke Godwin (1929–2013)
- Tom Godwin (1915–1980)
- Jacques Goimard (1934–2012)
- H. L. Gold (1914–1996)
- Lee Gold (born 1942)
- Stephen Goldin (born 1947)
- Lisa Goldstein (born 1953)
- Kathleen Ann Goonan (1952–2021)
- Rex Gordon (1917–1998) (pseudonym of Stanley Bennett Hough)
- Richard Gordon (1947–2009)
- Phyllis Gotlieb (1926–2009)
- Ron Goulart (1933–2022)
- Steven Gould (born 1955)
- Jean-Baptiste Cousin de Grainville (1746–1805)
- Charles L. Grant (1942–2006)
- Claudia Gray (born 1970)
- Dominic Green (born 1967)
- Nunsowe Green (fl. 1882, pseudonymous)
- Roland J. Green (1944–2021)
- Simon R. Green (born 1955)
- A. T. Greenblatt (fl. 2010–present)
- Colin Greenland (born 1954)
- William Greenleaf (born 1948)
- Percy Greg (1836–1889)
- Lois Gresh (born 1965)
- George Griffith (1857–1906)
- Nicola Griffith (born 1960)
- Jon Courtenay Grimwood (born 1953)
- Ken Grimwood (1944–2003)
- Alexander Gromov (in Russian Алекса́ндр Никола́евич Грóмов)
- Martin Grzimek (born 1950)
- Wyman Guin (1915–1989)
- Eileen Gunn (born 1945)
- James E. Gunn (1923–2020)

== H ==
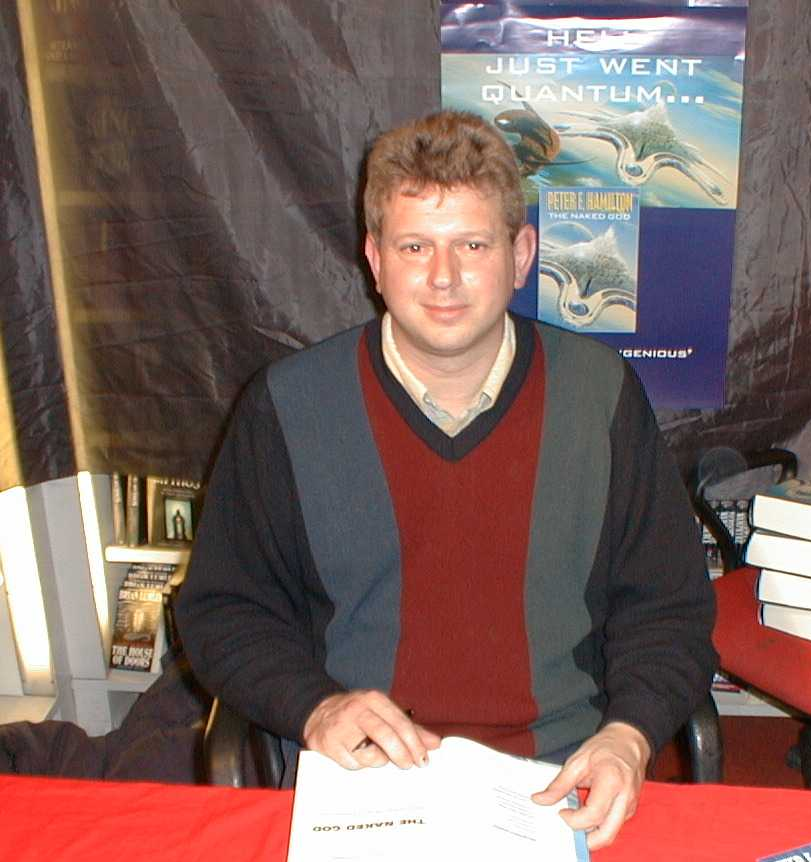
Peter F. Hamilton, 2006

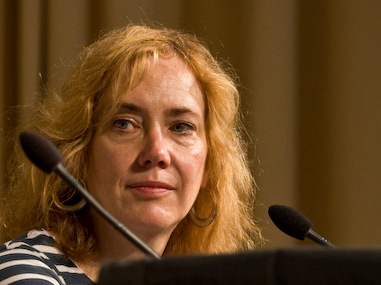
Elizabeth Hand, 2007

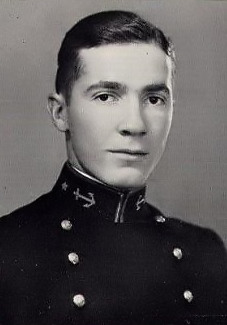
Midshipman Robert A. Heinlein, 1929

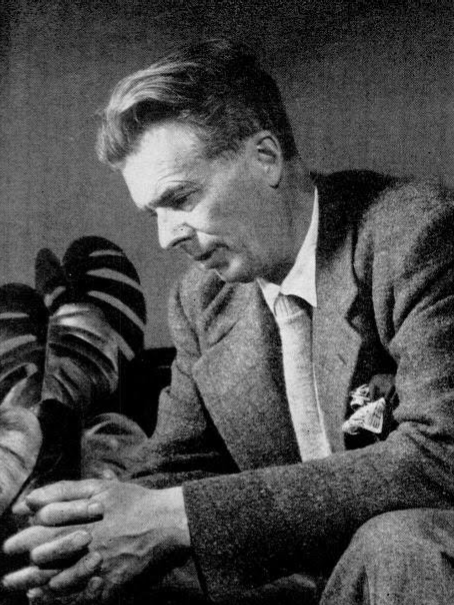
Aldous Huxley, 1954

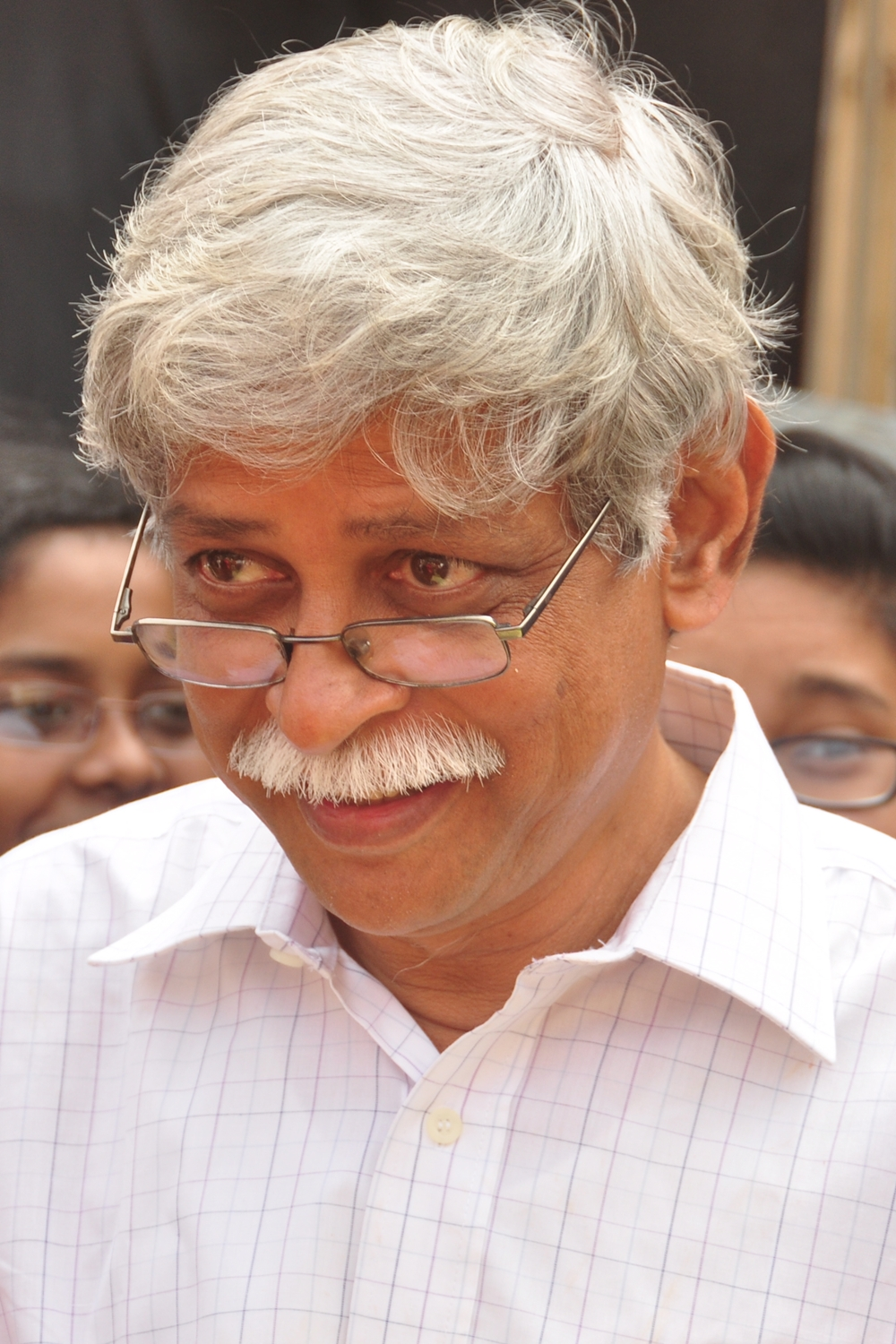
Muhammed Zafar Iqbal, 2013

- PJ Haarsma (born 1964)
- Karen Haber (born 1955)
- H. Rider Haggard (1856–1925)
- Ronald M. Hahn (born 1948)
- Isidore Haiblum (1935–2012)
- Jack C. Haldeman II (1941–2002)
- Joe Haldeman (born 1943)
- Austin Hall (1885–1933)
- Barbara Hambly (born 1951)
- Edmond Hamilton (1904–1977)
- Peter F. Hamilton (born 1960)
- Elizabeth Hand (born 1957)
- Otfrid von Hanstein (1869–1959)
- Lee Harding (1937–2023)
- Charles L. Harness (1915–2005)
- Clare Winger Harris (1891–1968)
- Harry Harrison (1925–2012)
- M. John Harrison (born 1945)
- Henry Hasse (1913–1977)
- Simon Hawke (born 1951)
- Peter Heck (born 1941)
- Robert A. Heinlein (1907–1988)
- Zenna Henderson (1917–1983)
- Joe L. Hensley (1926–2007)
- Brian Herbert (born 1947)
- Frank Herbert (1920–1986)
- Paul van Herck (1938–1989)
- Philip E. High (1914–2006)
- Douglas Hill (1935–2007)
- Ernest Hill (1915–2003)
- Matt Hill (born 1984)
- Charles Howard Hinton (1853–1907)
- Christopher Hinz (born 1951)
- Morioka Hiroyuki (born 1962) (in Japanese 森岡浩之)
- Christopher Hodder-Williams (1926–1995)
- P. C. Hodgell (born 1951)
- William Hope Hodgson (1877–1918)
- E. T. A. Hoffmann (1776–1822)
- Lee Hoffman (1932–2007)
- James P. Hogan (1941–2010)
- Ludvig Holberg (1684–1754)
- Elizabeth Holden (1943–2013)
- Robert Holdstock (1948–2009)
- H. H. Hollis (1921–1977) (pseudonym of Ben Neal Ramey)
- Nalo Hopkinson (born 1960)
- Shinichi Hoshi (1926–1997)
- Rokheya Sakhawat Hossain (Begum Rokheya) (1880? – 1932)
- Hayden Howard (1925–2014)
- Robert E. Howard (1906–1936)
- Hugh Howey (born 1975)
- Fred Hoyle (1915–2001)
- L. Ron Hubbard (1911–1986)
- Marek Huberath (born 1954)
- Matt Hughes (born 1949)
- Monica Hughes (1925–2003)
- Edna Mayne Hull (1905–1975)
- Cyril Hume (1900–1966)
- Stephen Hunt (born 1966)
- Kameron Hurley (born 1980)
- Dave Hutchinson (born 1960)
- Aldous Huxley (1894–1963)

== I ==
- Dragutin Ilić (1858–1926)
- Dean Ing (1931–2020)
- Simon Ings (born 1965)
- Muhammed Zafar Iqbal (born 1952)
- Kazuo Ishiguro (born 1954)
- Emmi Itäranta (born 1976)

== J ==
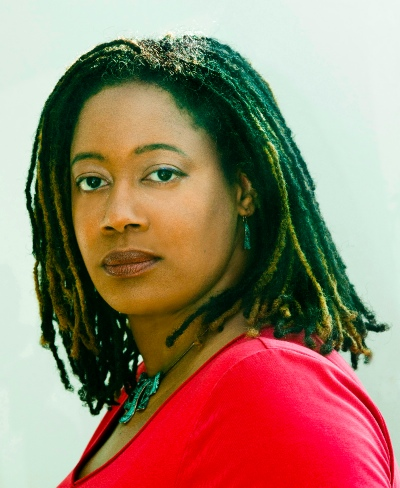
N. K. Jemisin, 2015

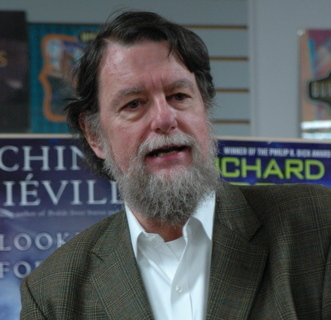
Robert Jordan, 2005

- Alexander Jablokov (born 1956)
- Muriel Jaeger (1892–1969)
- John Jakes (1932–2023)
- Malcolm Jameson (1891–1945)
- Phil Janes (fl. 1993–present)
- Laurence Janifer (1933–2002)
- N. K. Jemisin (born 1972)
- P. C. Jersild (born 1935)
- Wolfgang Jeschke (1936–2015)
- K. W. Jeter (born 1950)
- Michel Jeury (1934–2015)
- Xia Jia (born 1984)
- George Clayton Johnson (1929–2015)
- D. F. Jones (1917–1981)
- Gwyneth Jones (born 1952)
- Neil R. Jones (1909–1988)
- Raymond F. Jones (1915–1994)
- Diana Wynne Jones (1934–2011)
- Robert Jordan (1948–2007)
- M. K. Joseph (1914–1981)
- Emmanuel Jouanne (1960–2008)
- Theodore Judson (born 1951)
- Unno Juza (1897–1949)

== K ==
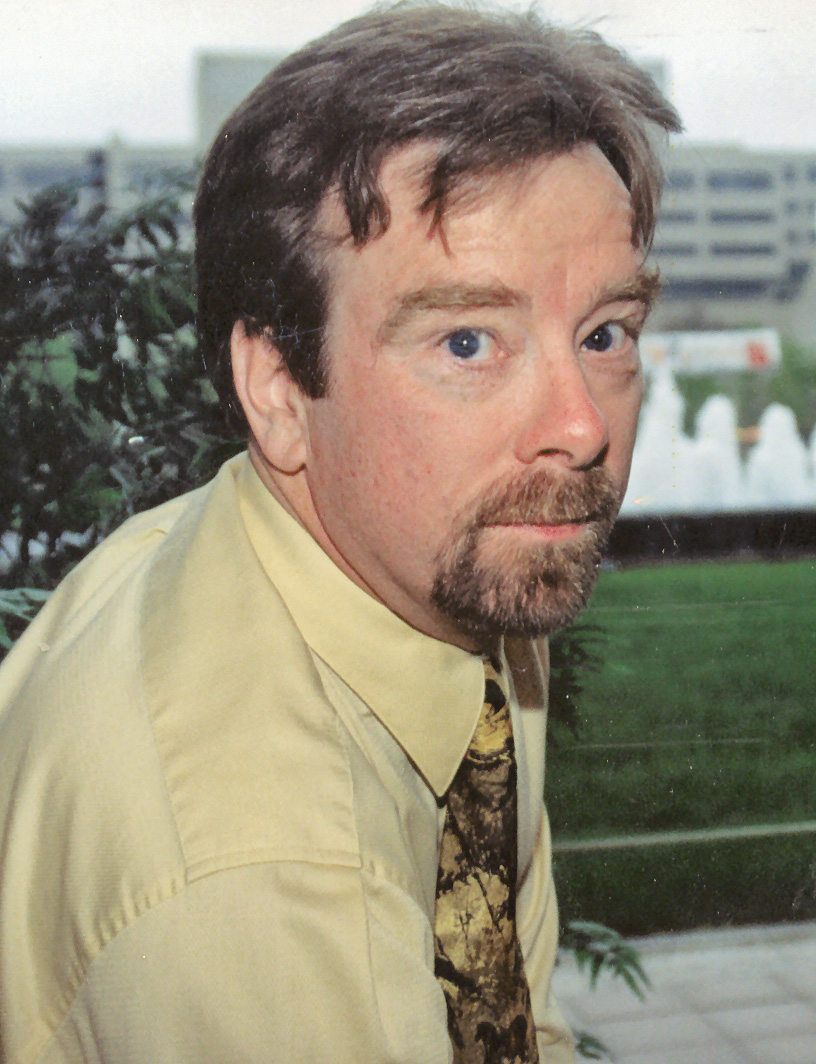
James Patrick Kelly, 2008

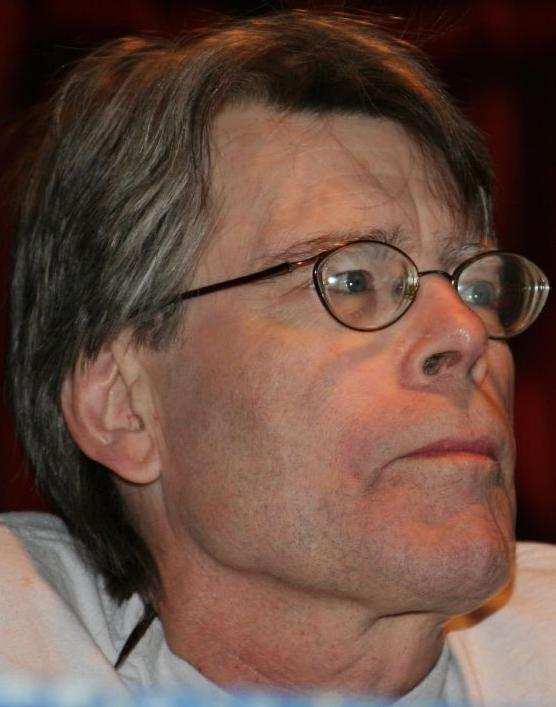
Stephen King, 2007

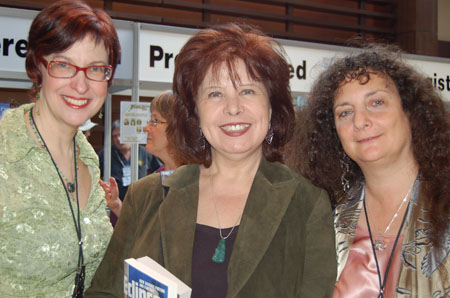
Nancy Kress (center), with author Delia Sherman (left) and editor Ellen Datlow (right). 2007 photo.

- Vilma Kadlečková (born 1971)
- Franz Kafka (1883–1924)
- Janet Kagan (1946–2008)
- Michael Kandel (born 1941)
- Colin Kapp (1928–2007)
- Alexander Kazantsev (1906–2002)
- Joseph E. Kelleam (1913–1975)
- David H. Keller (1880–1966)
- James Patrick Kelly (born 1951)
- Rick Kennett (born 1956)
- Steven L. Kent (born 1960)
- Katharine Kerr (born 1944)
- John Kessel (born 1950)
- Roy Kettle (born 1949)
- Alexander Key (1904–1979)
- Daniel Keyes (1927–2014)
- Gregory Keyes (born 1963)
- David Kier (born 1943)
- Caitlín R. Kiernan (born 1964)
- Lee Killough (born 1942)
- Wade A. Kimberlin (born 1970)
- Sara King (born 1982)
- Stephen King (born 1947)
- Vincent King (1935–2000)
- Rudyard Kipling (1865–1936)
- John Kippax (1915–1974)
- Donald Kingsbury (born 1929)
- Hugh Kingsmill (1889–1949)
- Jack Kirby (1917–1994)
- David Barr Kirtley (born 1977)
- Annette Curtis Klause (born 1953)
- Gérard Klein (born 1937)
- Otis Adelbert Kline (1891–1946)
- Marko Kloos (fl. 2011–present)
- Nigel Kneale (1922–2006)
- Boban Knežević (born 1959)
- Damon Knight (1922–2002)
- Norman L. Knight (1895–1972)
- Walter Koenig (1936–2026)
- Lazar Komarčić (1839–1909)
- Dean R. Koontz (born 1945)
- Cyril M. Kornbluth (1923–1958)
- Mary Robinette Kowal (born 1969)
- Tom Kratman (born 1956)
- Nancy Kress (born 1948)
- Günther Krupkat (1905–1990)
- Zoran Krušvar (born 1977)
- Michael P. Kube-McDowell (born 1954)
- Walter Kubilius (1918–1993)
- Michael Kurland (born 1938)
- Björn Kurtén (1924–1988)
- Katherine Kurtz (born 1944)
- Henry Kuttner (1915–1958)
- David Kyle (1919–2016)

== L ==
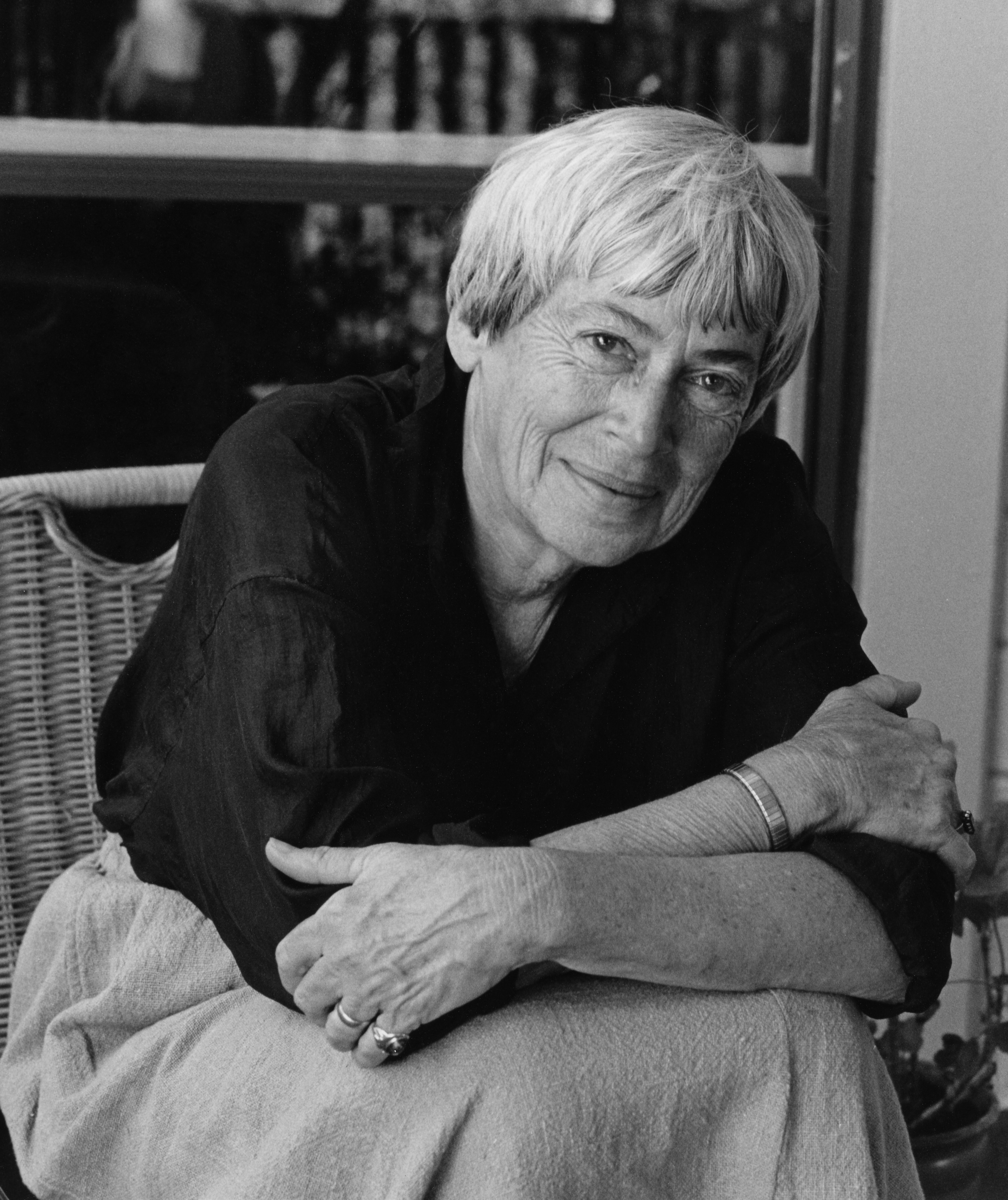
Ursula K. Le Guin, 2009

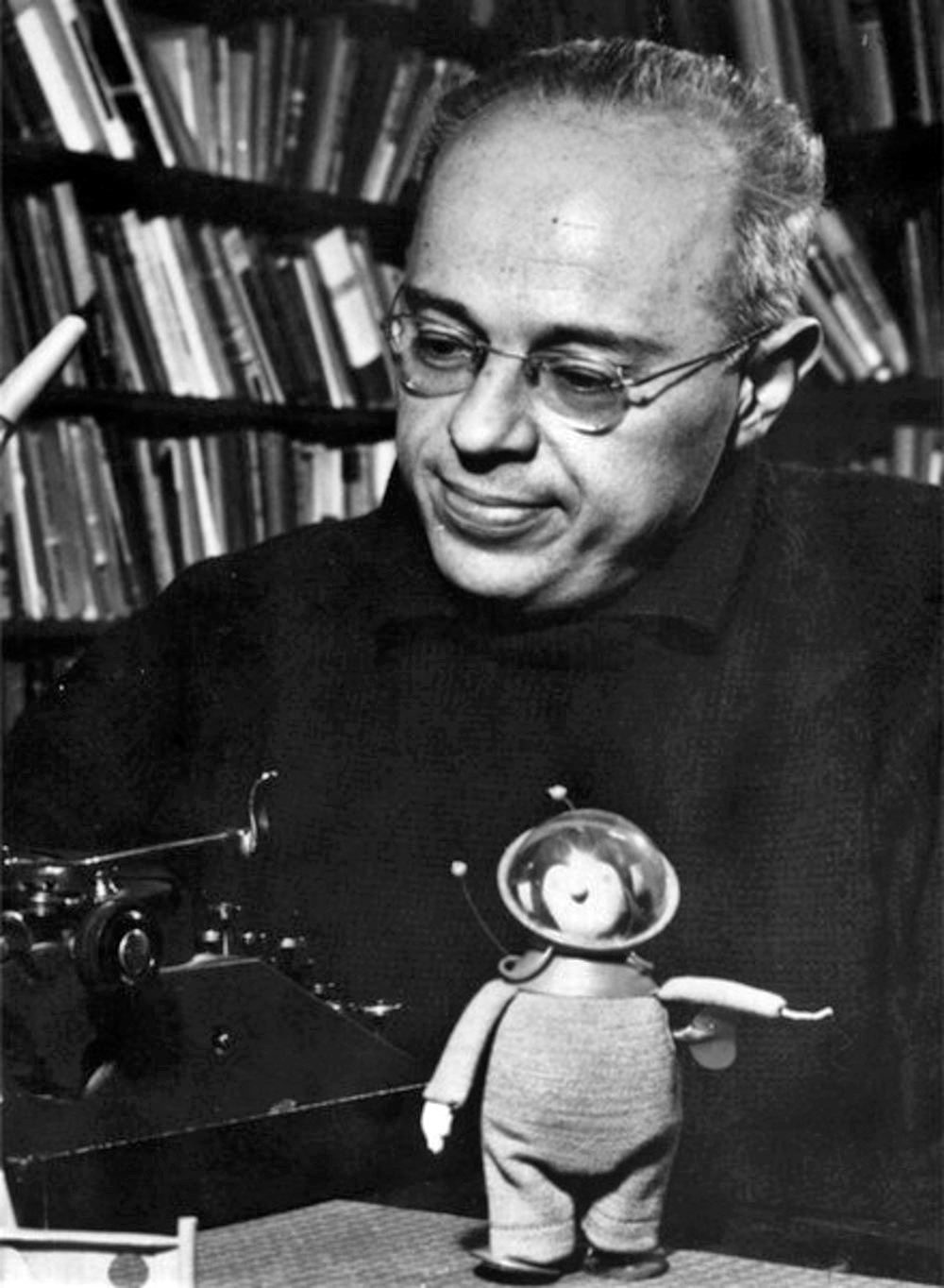
Stanisław Lem, 1966

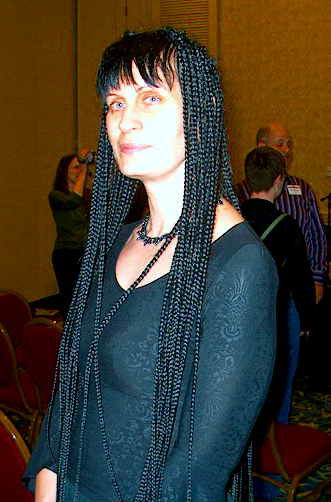
Shariann Lewitt, 2007

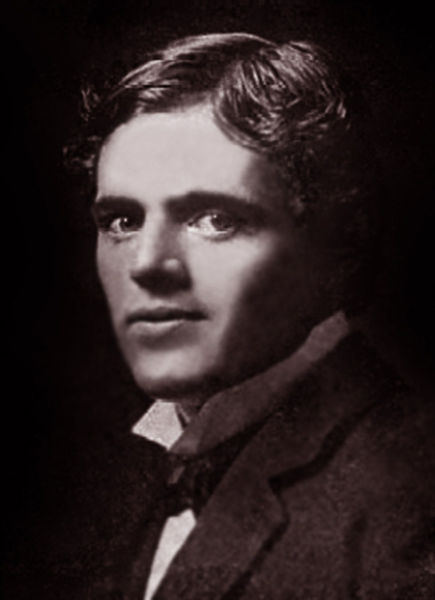
Jack London, 1900

- W. S. Lach-Szyrma (1841–1915)
- R. A. Lafferty (1914–2002)
- Jay Lake (1964–2014)
- Louis L'Amour (1908–1988)
- Geoffrey Landis (born 1955)
- David Langford (born 1953)
- Sterling E. Lanier (1927–2007)
- Justine Larbalestier (born 1967)
- Glen A. Larson (1937–2014)
- Kurd Lasswitz (1848–1910)
- Philip Latham (1902–1981) (pseudonym of Robert S. Richardson)
- Yulia Latynina (born 1966)
- Keith Laumer (1925–1993)
- Stephen R. Lawhead (born 1950)
- W. H. C. Lawrence (fl. 1889)
- Alain Le Bussy (1947–2010)
- Ursula K. Le Guin (1929–2018)
- Ann Leckie (born 1966)
- Gentry Lee (born 1942)
- Mary Soon Lee (born 1965)
- Sharon Lee (born 1952)
- Stan Lee (1922–2018)
- Tanith Lee (1947–2015)
- Yoon Ha Lee (born 1979)
- Fritz Leiber (1910–1992)
- Murray Leinster (1896–1975) (pseudonym of Will F. Jenkins)
- Stanisław Lem (1921–2006)
- Edward M. Lerner (born 1949)
- Milton Lesser (1928–2008) (pseudonym of Stephen Marlowe)
- Doris Lessing (1919–2013)
- Jonathan Lethem (born 1964)
- David D. Levine (born 1961)
- Paul Levinson (born 1947)
- Roger Levy (fl. 2001–2018)
- C. S. Lewis (1898–1963)
- Shariann Lewitt (born 1954)
- Jacqueline Lichtenberg (born 1942)
- Jean-Marc Ligny (born 1956)
- Brad Linaweaver (1952–2019)
- Dénis Lindbohm (1927–2005)
- David Lindsay (1876–1945)
- Liu Cixin (born 1963)
- Ken Liu (born 1976)
- Ken Lizzi (born 1969)
- John Uri Lloyd (1849–1936)
- Jack London (1876–1916)
- Amelia Reynolds Long (1904–1978)
- Frank Belknap Long (1901–1994)
- Barry B. Longyear (1942–2025)
- Jean Lorrah (born 1938)
- H. P. Lovecraft (1890–1937)
- Archibald Low (1888–1956)
- Nathan Lowell (born 1952)
- Robert A. W. Lowndes (1916–1998)
- Lois Lowry (born 1937)
- George Lucas (born 1944)
- Lucian (born c.125)
- Nicole Luiken (born 1971)
- Sergey Lukyanenko (born 1968)
- Duncan Lunan (born 1945)
- Sam Lundwall (born 1941)
- Richard A. Lupoff (1935–2020)
- John Lymington (1911–1983)
- Elizabeth A. Lynn (born 1946)
- Edward Bulwer-Lytton (1803–1873)

== M ==
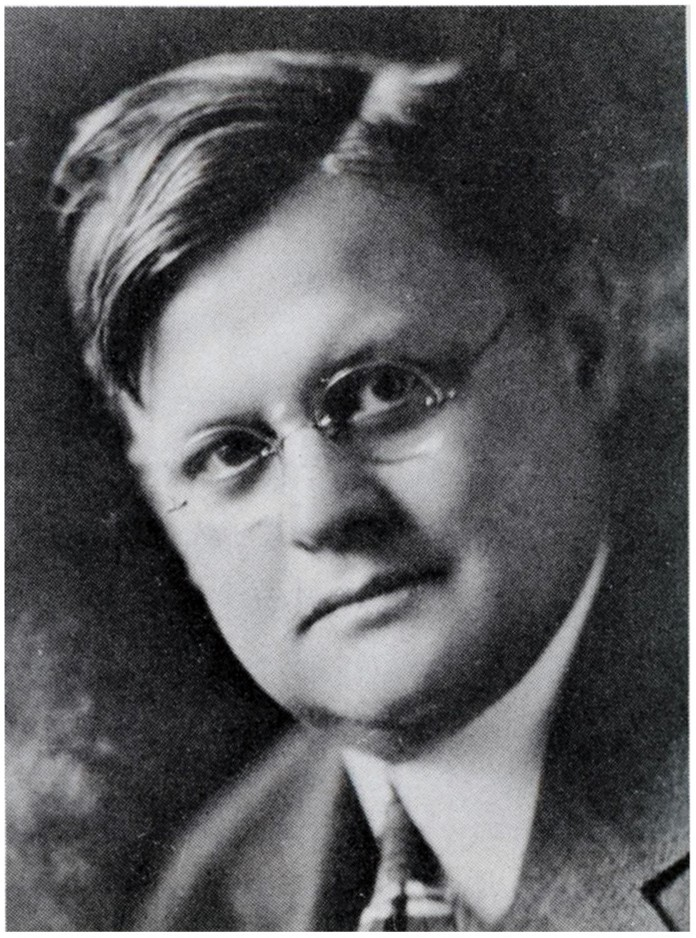
A. Merritt, c. 1920

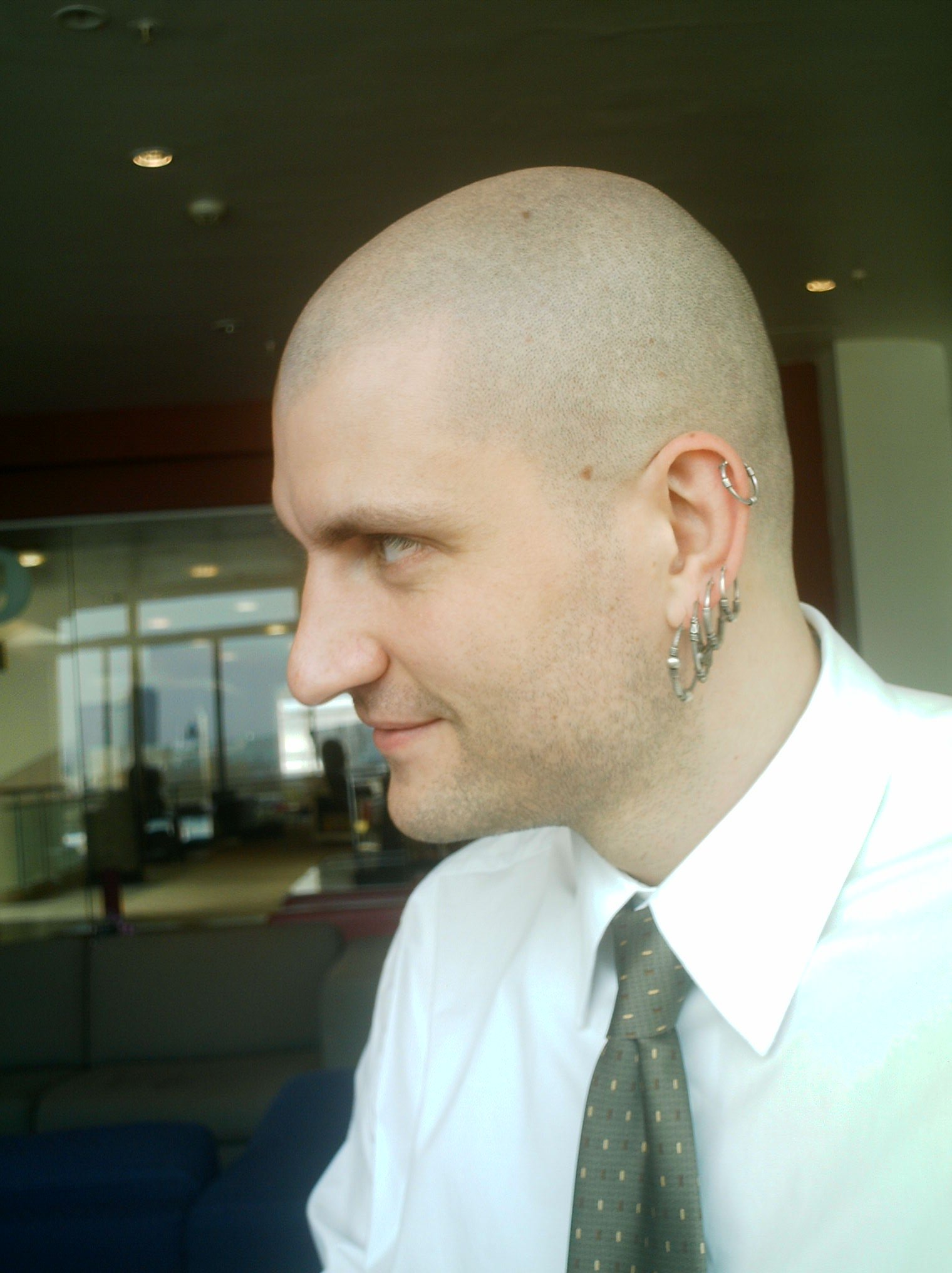
China Miéville, 2006

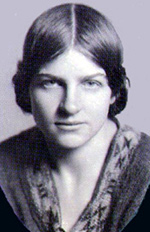
Naomi Mitchison, 1920s

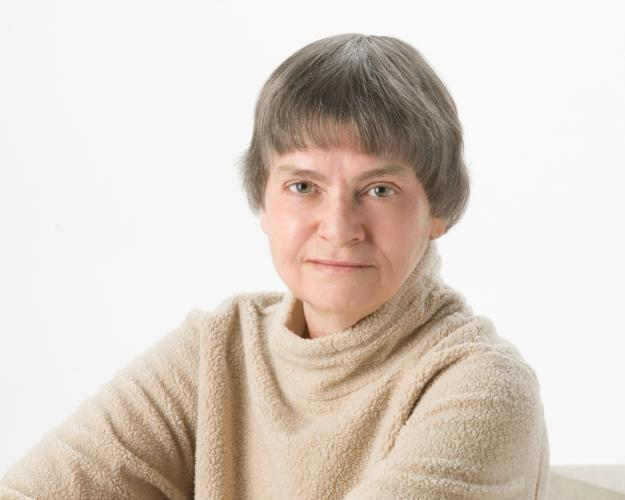
Judith Moffett, 2008

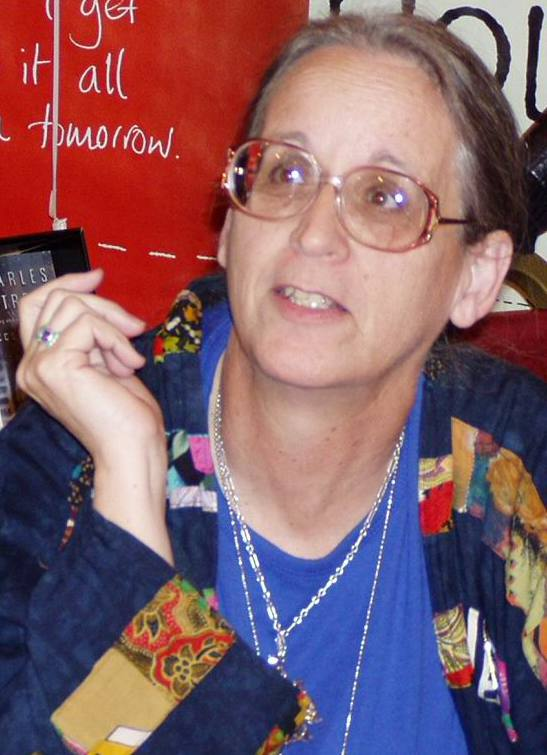
Elizabeth Moon, 2005

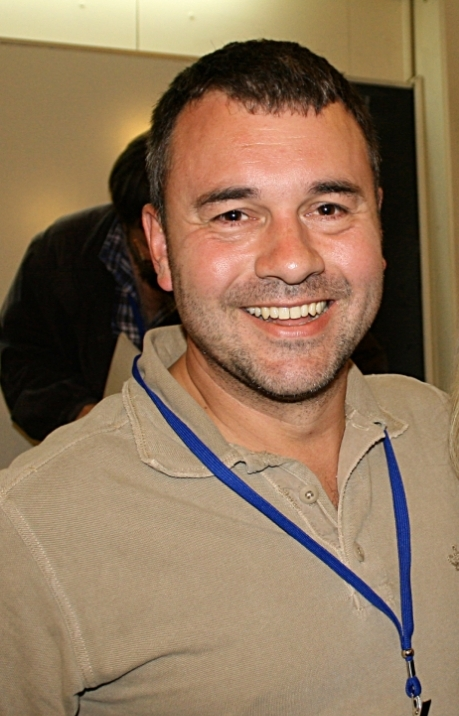
Richard Morgan, 2008

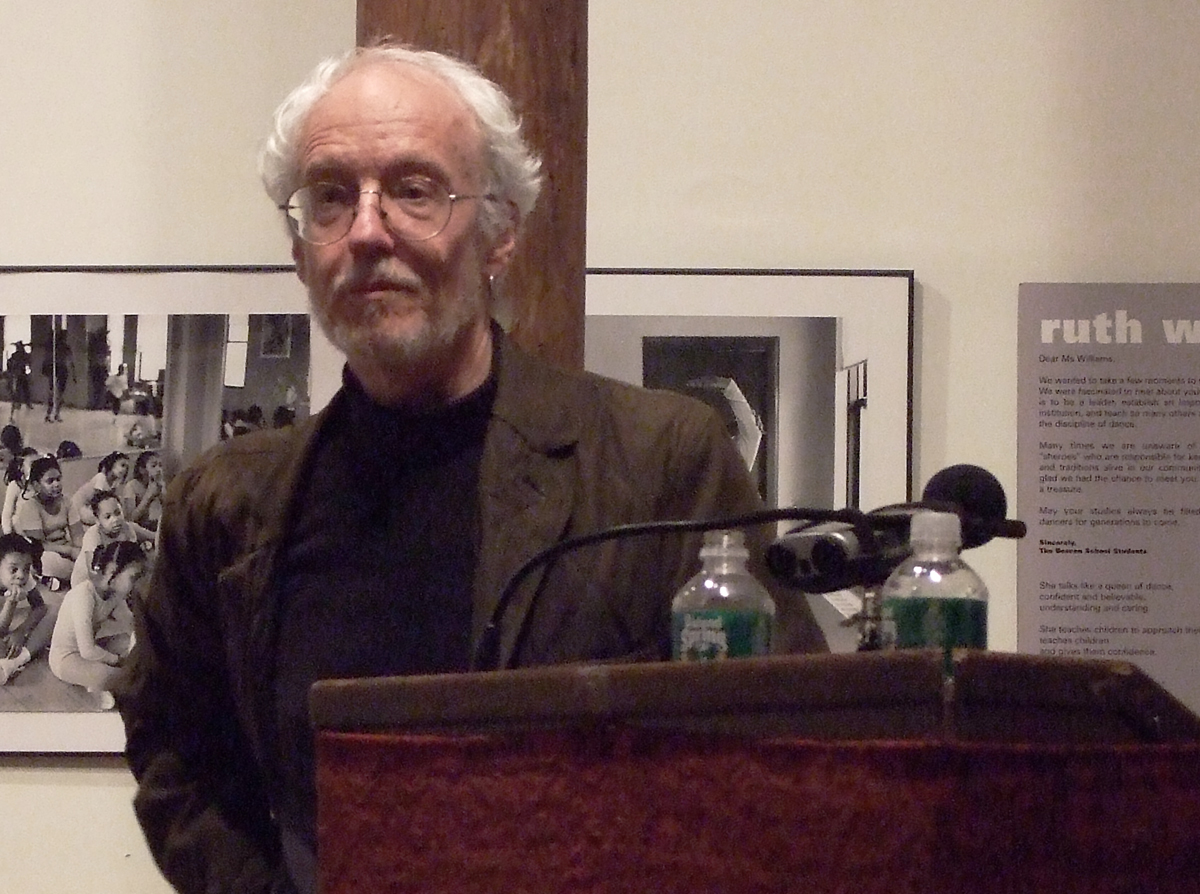
James Morrow, 2007

- Darko Macan (born 1966)
- Paul J. McAuley (born 1955)
- Ed McBain (1926–2005)
- Anne McCaffrey (1926–2011)
- Wil McCarthy (born 1966)
- David McDaniel (1944–1977)
- Jack McDevitt (born 1935)
- Ian McDonald (born 1960)
- James D. Macdonald (born 1954)
- John D. MacDonald (1916–1986)
- William P. McGivern (1918–1982)
- Maureen F. McHugh (born 1959)
- J. T. McIntosh (1925–2008)
- Will McIntosh (born 1962)
- F. Gwynplaine MacIntyre (c. 1948–2010)
- Vonda N. McIntyre (1948–2019)
- R. W. Mackelworth (1930–2000)
- Richard McKenna (1913–1964)
- Katherine MacLean (1925–2019)
- Ian R. MacLeod (born 1956)
- Ken MacLeod (born 1954)
- Neil McMahon (born 1949)
- Sean McMullen (born 1948)
- Mike McQuay (1949–1995)
- Angus MacVicar (1908–2001)
- Tom Maddox (1945–2022)
- Charles Eric Maine (1921–1981) (pseudonym of David McIlwain)
- Donald Malcolm (1930–1975)
- Daryl F. Mallett (born 1969)
- Barry N. Malzberg (1939–2024)
- George Mann (born 1978)
- Laurence Manning (1899–1972)
- Leo Margulies (1900–1975)
- Stephen Marley (born 1946)
- Paul Marlowe (fl. 2000–2014)
- George R. R. Martin (born 1948)
- Arkady Martine (born 1985)
- David Marusek (born 1951)
- Richard Matheson (1926–2013)
- Susan R. Matthews (born 1952)
- Julian May (1931–2017)
- Ged Maybury (born 1953)
- John Meaney (born 1957)
- S. P. Meek (1894–1972)
- R. M. Meluch (born 1956)
- Miguel Mendonça (born 1973)
- Richard C. Meredith (1937–1979)
- Robert Merle (1908–2004)
- Judith Merril (1923–1997)
- A. Merritt (1884–1943)
- Sam Merwin Jr. (1910–1996)
- Régis Messac (1893–1945)
- John Metcalfe (1891–1965)
- Melinda Metz (born 1962)
- Robert A. Metzger (born 1956)
- Stephenie Meyer (born 1973)
- John B. Michel (1917–1969)
- China Miéville (born 1972)
- Victor Milán (1954–2018)
- Joel A. Miller (born 1977)
- John J. Miller (1954–2022)
- P. Schuyler Miller (1912–1974)
- R. DeWitt Miller (1910–1958)
- Walter M. Miller, Jr. (1923–1996)
- Edward Page Mitchell (1852–1927)
- Kirk Mitchell (born 1950)
- Syne Mitchell (born 1970)
- Naomi Mitchison (1897–1999)
- Premendra Mitra (1904–1988)
- L. E. Modesitt, Jr. (born 1943)
- Judith Moffett (born 1942)
- Donald Moffitt (1936–2014)
- Thomas F. Monteleone (born 1946)
- Elizabeth Moon (born 1945)
- Michael Moorcock (born 1939)
- Alan Moore (born 1953)
- C. L. Moore (1911–1987)
- Patrick Moore (1923–2012)
- Ward Moore (1903–1978)
- Daniel Keys Moran (born 1962)
- Dan Morgan (1925–2011)
- Richard K. Morgan (born 1965)
- Chris Moriarty (born 1968)
- A. R. Morlan (1958–2016)
- John Morressy (1930–2006)
- Chris Morris (born 1946)
- Janet Morris (1946–2024)
- William Morrison (1906–1982) (pseudonym of Joseph Samachson)
- James Morrow (born 1947)
- Sam Moskowitz (1920–1997)
- John Munro (1849–1930)
- Pat Murphy (born 1955)
- Øyvind Myhre (born 1945)

== N ==
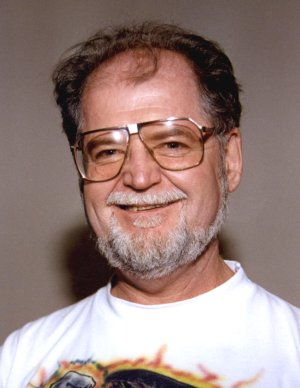
Larry Niven, photo before 2005

- Linda Nagata (born 1960)
- Jayant Narlikar (1938–2025) (Marathi: जयंत विष्णू नारळीकर)
- Grant Naylor (joint pseudonym of Rob Grant and Doug Naylor)
- Ondrej Neff (born 1945)
- Geoff Nelder (born 1947)
- Ray Nelson (1931–2022)
- István Nemere (1944–2024)
- Josef Nesvadba (1926–2005)
- Kris Neville (1925–1980)
- Eirik Newth (born 1964)
- Yuri Nikitin (in Russian Юрий Никитин) (1939–2025)
- Larry Niven (born 1938)
- William F. Nolan (1928–2021)
- Jeff Noon (born 1957)
- John Norman (born 1931)
- Lisanne Norman (born 1951)
- Eric North (1884–1968) (pseudonym of Bernard Cronin)
- Andre Norton (1912–2005) (pseudonym of Alice Mary Norton)
- Philip Francis Nowlan (1888–1940)
- Alan E. Nourse (1928–1992)
- Charles Nuetzel (born 1934)
- Eric S. Nylund (born 1964)

== O ==
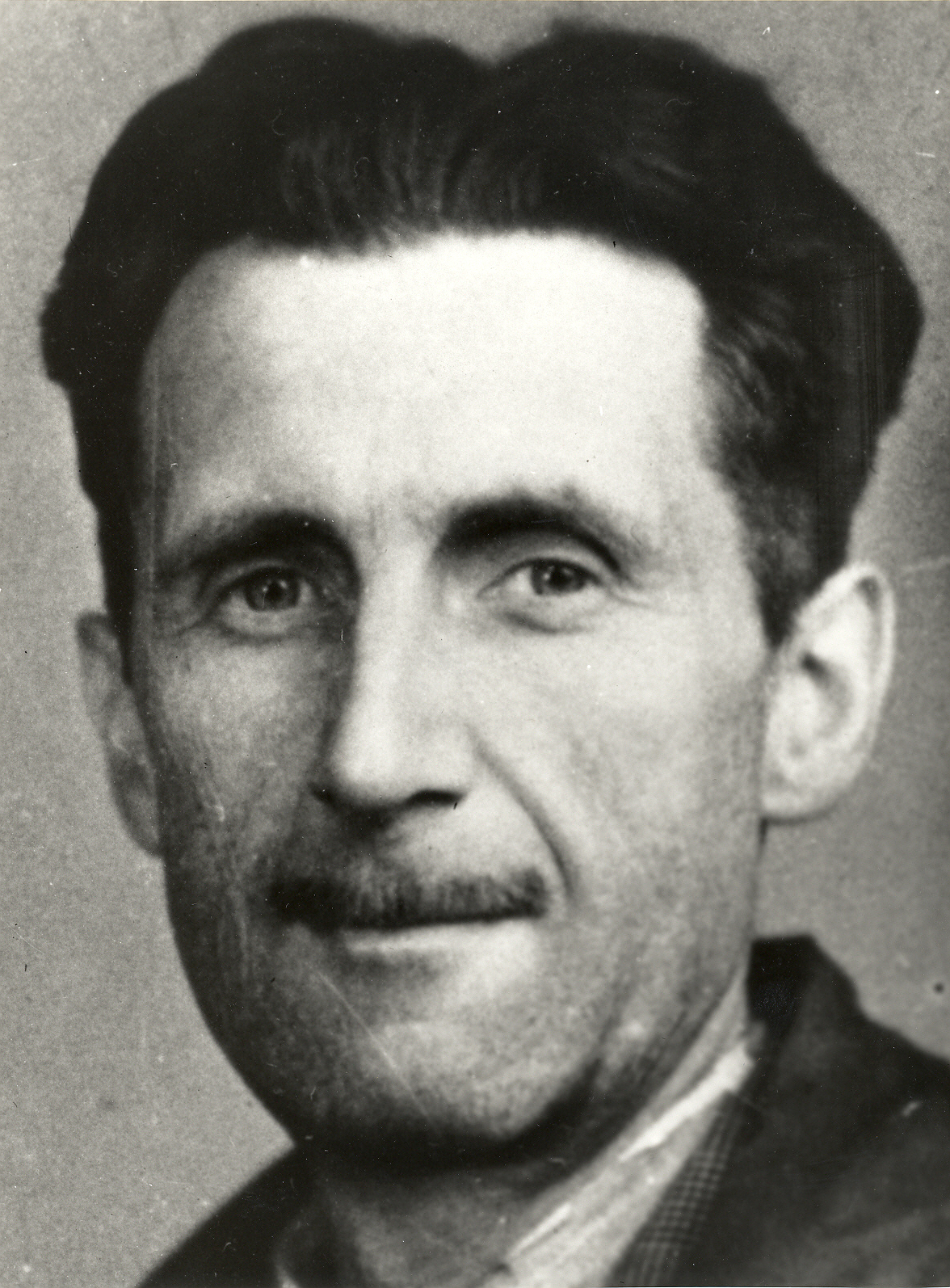
George Orwell, 1943

- Robert C. O'Brien (1918–1973)
- Kevin O'Donnell, Jr. (1950–2012)
- Patrick O'Leary (born 1952)
- Raven Oak (born 1977)
- Vladimir Obruchev (1863–1956)
- Edwin Vincent Odle (1890–1942)
- Andrew J. Offutt (1934–2013)
- Nnedi Okorafor (born 1974)
- Chad Oliver (1928–1993)
- Bob Olsen (1884–1956)
- Jerry Oltion (born 1957)
- Marek Oramus (born 1952)
- Jerry Ordway (born 1957)
- Rebecca Ore (born 1948)
- George Orwell (1903–1950) (pseudonym of Eric Arthur Blair)
- Karen Osborne (born 1980)
- John Ostrander (born 1949)
- A. K. Otterness (fl. 1992–2012)

== P ==
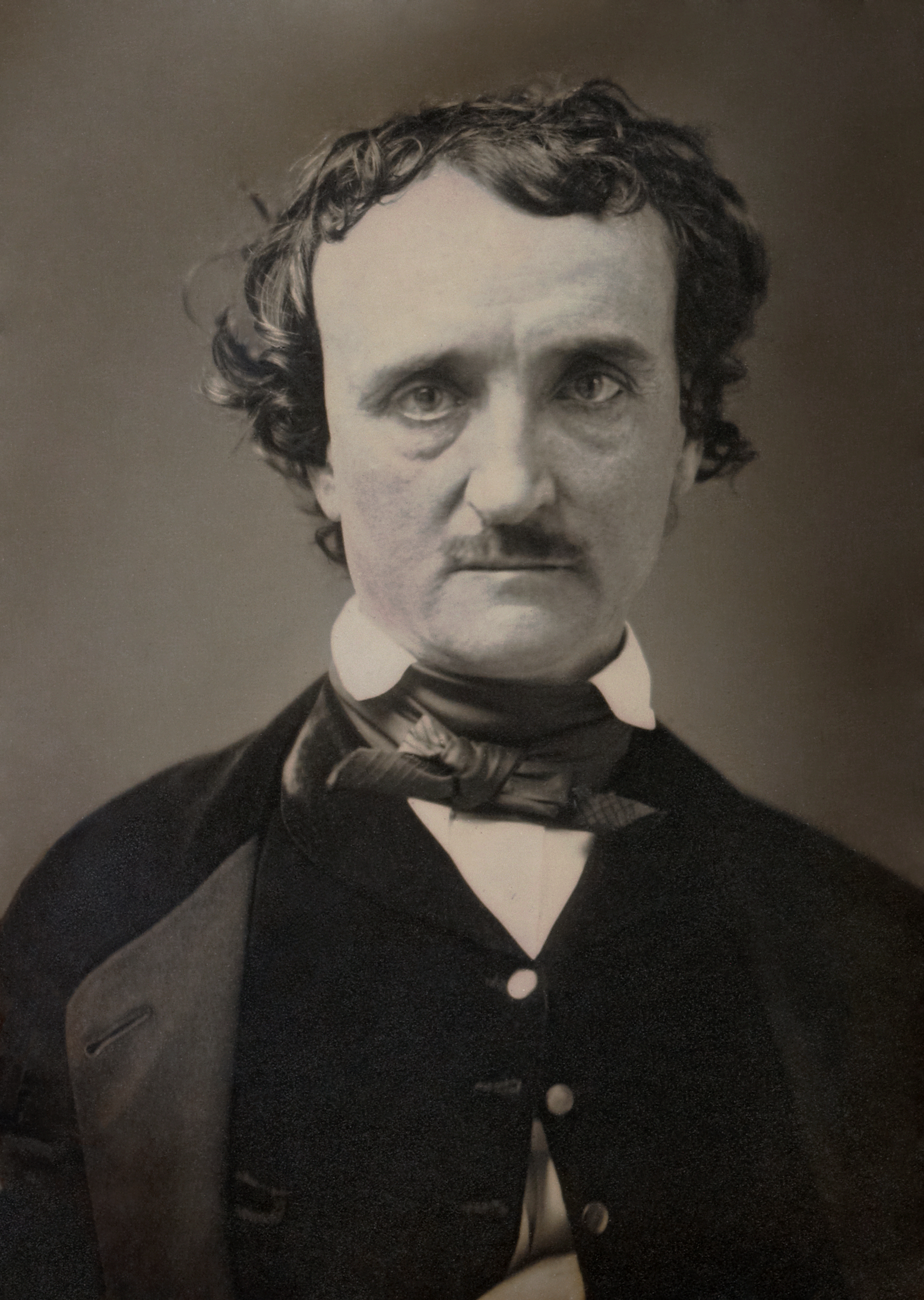
Edgar Allan Poe, 1849

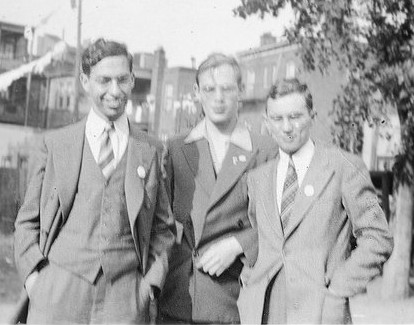
Frederik Pohl (center) with Donald A. Wollheim (left) and John Michel (right, circa 1938

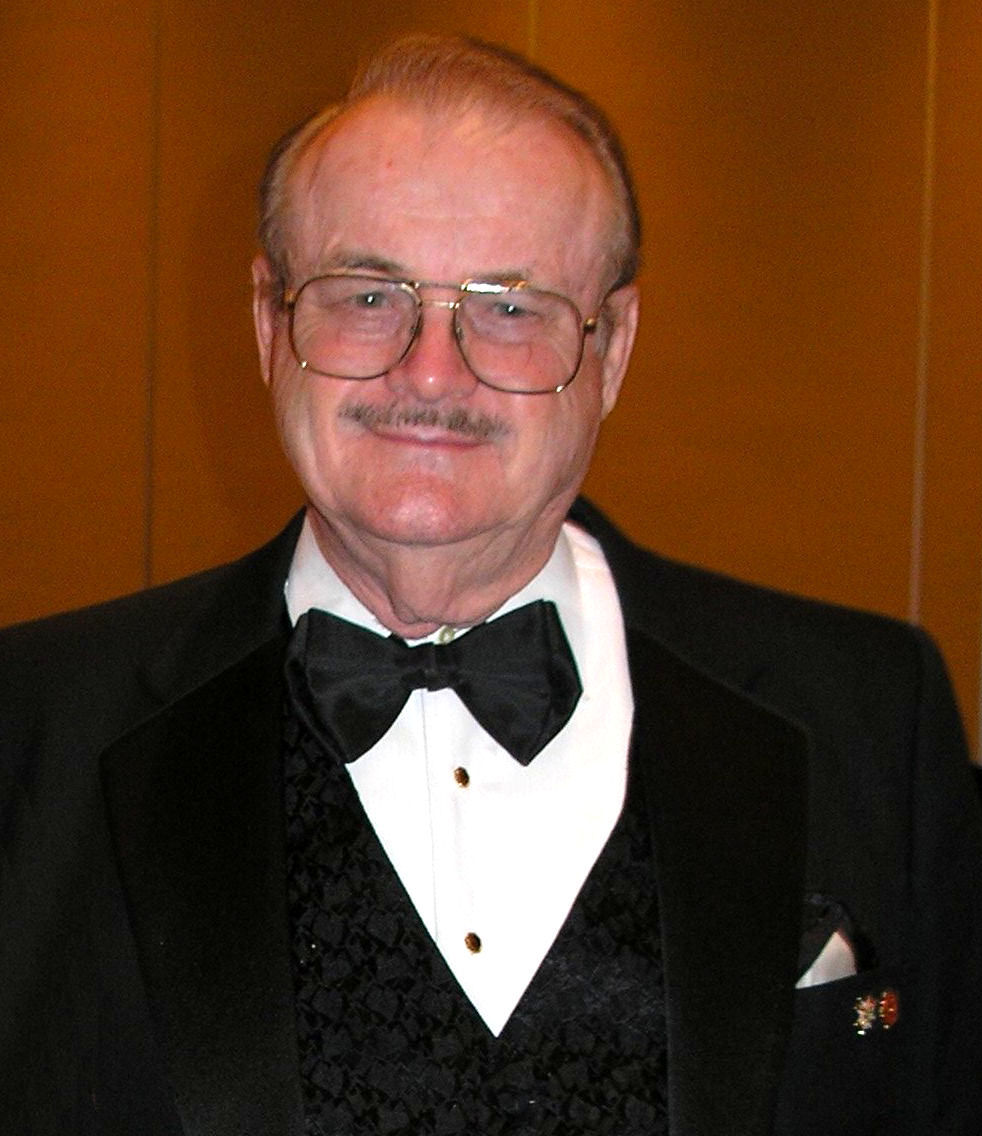
Jerry Pournelle, 2005

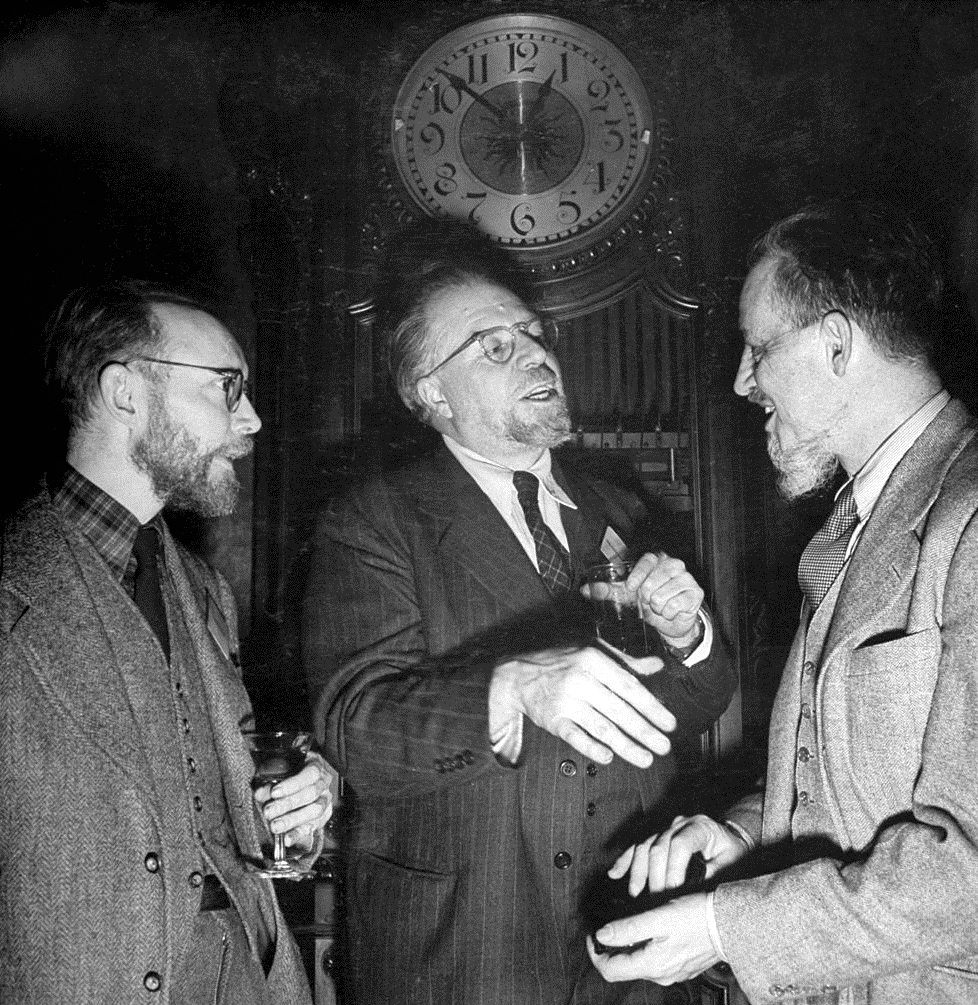
Fletcher Pratt (left) with Christopher Morley and Rex Stout, 1944

- Lewis Padgett (joint pseudonym of Henry Kuttner and C. L. Moore)
- Michel Pagel (born 1961)
- George Pal (1908–1980)
- Ada Palmer (born 1981)
- David R. Palmer (born 1941)
- Jane Palmer (born 1946)
- Philip Palmer (born 1960)
- Raymond A. Palmer (1910–1977)
- Edgar Pangborn (1909–1976)
- Alexei Panshin (1940–2022)
- Cory Panshin (born 1947)
- Christopher Paolini (born 1980)
- Richard Parks (born 1955)
- James Patterson (born 1947)
- Stel Pavlou (born 1970)
- Donald G. Payne (1924–2018) (also known as James Vance Marshall, Ian Cameron, and Donald Gordon)
- Hayford Peirce (1942–2020)
- Charles Pellegrino (born 1953)
- Dalibor Perković (born 1974)
- Leslie Perri (1920–1970)
- Steve Perry (born 1947)
- Lawrence Person (born 1965)
- Emil Petaja (1915–2000)
- Wildy Petoud (born 1957)
- John T. Phillifent (1916–1976)
- Mark Phillips (joint pseudonym used by Laurence Janifer (1933–2002) and Randall Garrett (1927–1987))
- Peter Phillips (1920–2012)
- Rog Phillips (1909–1965) (pseudonym of Roger P. Graham)
- Eden Phillpotts (1862–1960)
- Bal Phondke (born 1939) (Marathi: डॉ. बाळ फोंडके)
- John R. Pierce (1910–2002) (also known as J.J. Coupling)
- Marge Piercy (born 1936)
- H. Beam Piper (1904–1964)
- Doris Piserchia (1928–2021)
- Brian Plante (born 1956)
- Charles Platt (born 1945)
- P. J. Plauger (born 1944)
- Van Allen Plexico (born 1968)
- Edgar Allan Poe (1809–1849)
- Frederik Pohl (1919–2013)
- Arthur Porges (1915–2006)
- Jerry Pournelle (1933–2017)
- Gareth L. Powell (born 1970)
- Tim Powers (born 1952)
- Terry Pratchett (1948–2015)
- Fletcher Pratt (1897–1956)
- Robert Presslie (1920–2002)
- Paul Preuss (born 1942)
- Cherie Priest (born 1975)
- Christopher Priest (1943–2024)
- Philip Pullman (born 1946)

== Q ==
- Roberto Quaglia (born 1962)
- William Thomas Quick (born 1946)
- Daniel Quinn (1935–2018)

== R ==
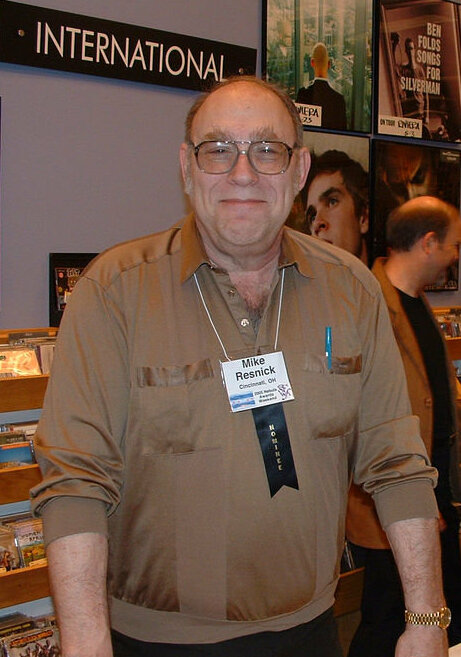
Mike Resnick, 2008

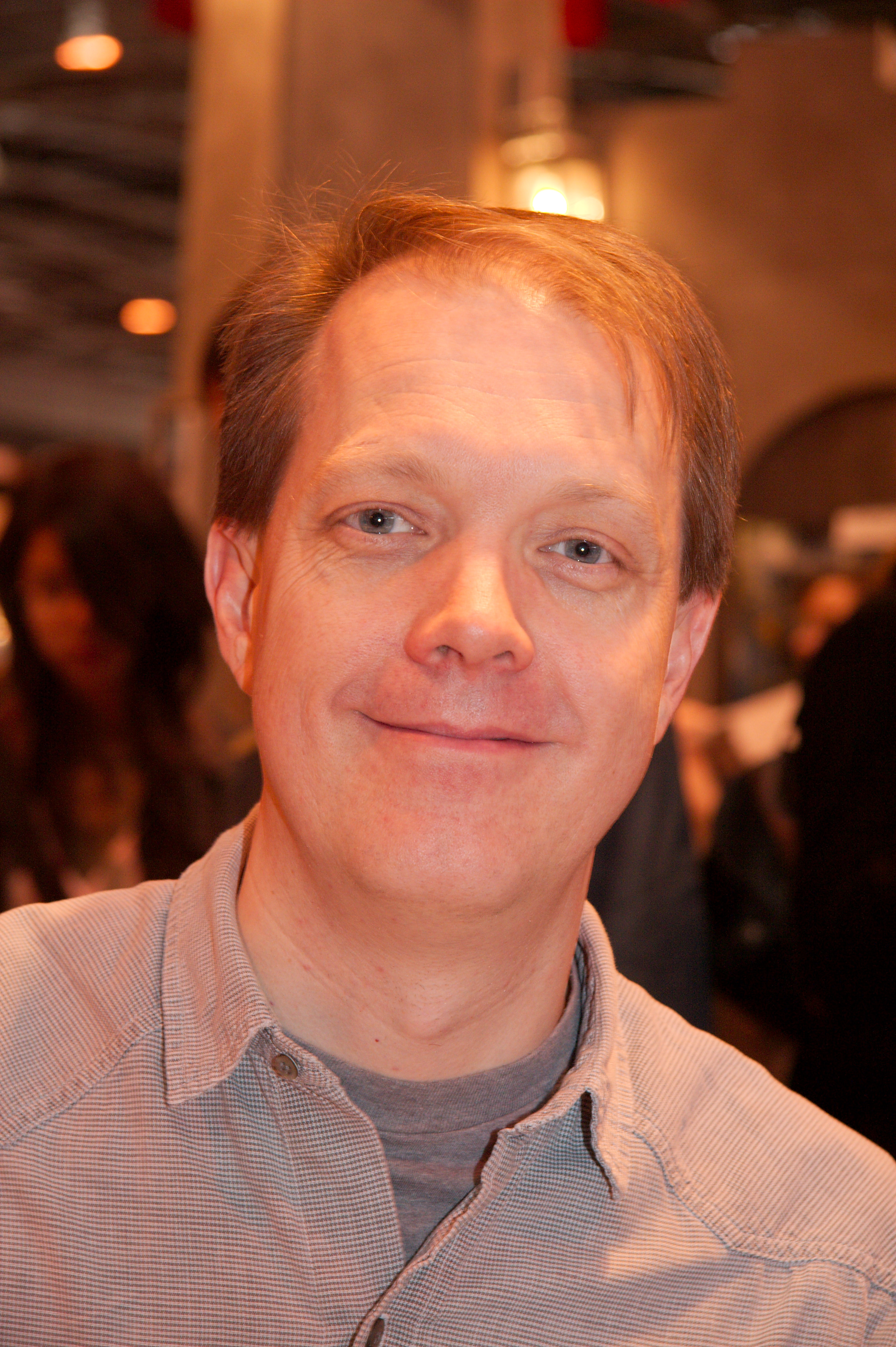
Adam Roberts, 2008

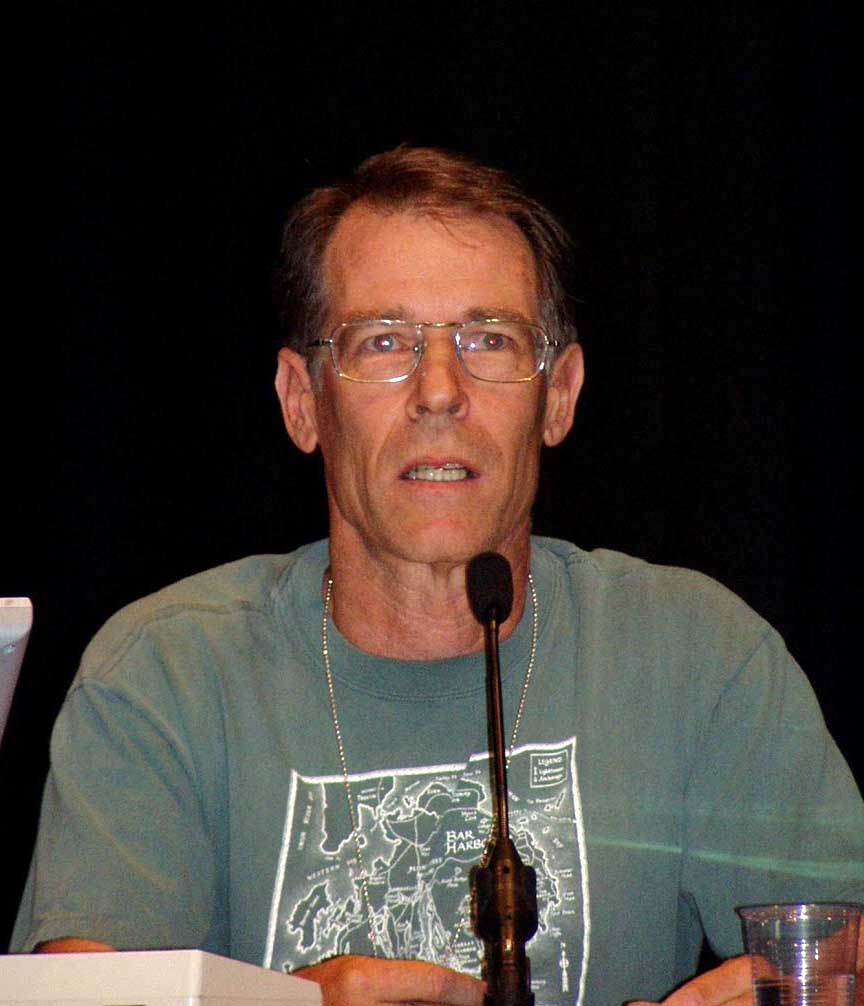
Kim Stanley Robinson, 2005

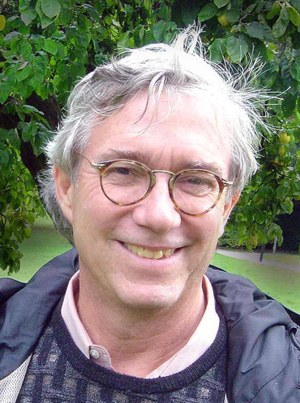
Rudy Rucker, 2006

- Ayn Rand (1905–1982)
- Bill Ransom (born 1945)
- Carlos Rasch (1932–2021)
- Hannu Rajaniemi (born 1978)
- Marta Randall (born 1948)
- Melanie Rawn (born 1954)
- Satyajit Ray (1921–1992)
- Francis G. Rayer (1921–1981)
- Tom Reamy (1935–1977)
- Robert Reed (born 1956)
- Philip Reeve (born 1966)
- Miha Remec (1928–2020)
- Maurice Renard (1875–1939)
- Ed Earl Repp (1901–1979)
- Laura Resnick (born 1962)
- Mike Resnick (1942–2020)
- Lester del Rey (1915–1993)
- Alastair Reynolds (born 1966)
- Mack Reynolds (1917–1983)
- Christopher Rice (born 1978)
- Christopher Ride (born 1965)
- John Ringo (born 1963)
- Adam Roberts (born 1965)
- Keith Roberts (1935–2000)
- Shauna S. Roberts (born 1956)
- Stephen Robinett (1941–2004)
- Frank M. Robinson (1926–2014)
- Jeanne Robinson (1948–2010)
- Kim Stanley Robinson (born 1952)
- Spider Robinson (born 1948)
- Justina Robson (born 1968)
- Esther Rochon (born 1948)
- Ross Rocklynne (1913–1988)
- Gene Roddenberry (1921–1991)
- Simon Rose (born 1961)
- Joel Rosenberg (1954–2011)
- Mary Rosenblum (1952–2018)
- J.-H. Rosny (joint pseudonym of Joseph (1856–1940) and Séraphin (1859–1948) Boex)
- Patrick Rothfuss (born 1973)
- M. A. Rothman
- Milton A. Rothman (1919–2001)
- Tony Rothman (born 1953)
- William Rotsler (1926–1997)
- Gustave Le Rouge (1867–1938)
- Christopher Rowley (born 1948)
- Rudy Rucker (born 1946)
- Anthony M. Rud (1893–1942)
- Christopher Ruocchio
- Kristine Kathryn Rusch (born 1960)
- Joanna Russ (1937–2011)
- Eric Frank Russell (1905–1978)
- Mary Doria Russell (born 1950)
- Richard Paul Russo (born 1954)
- A. Merc Rustad (born 1986)

== S ==
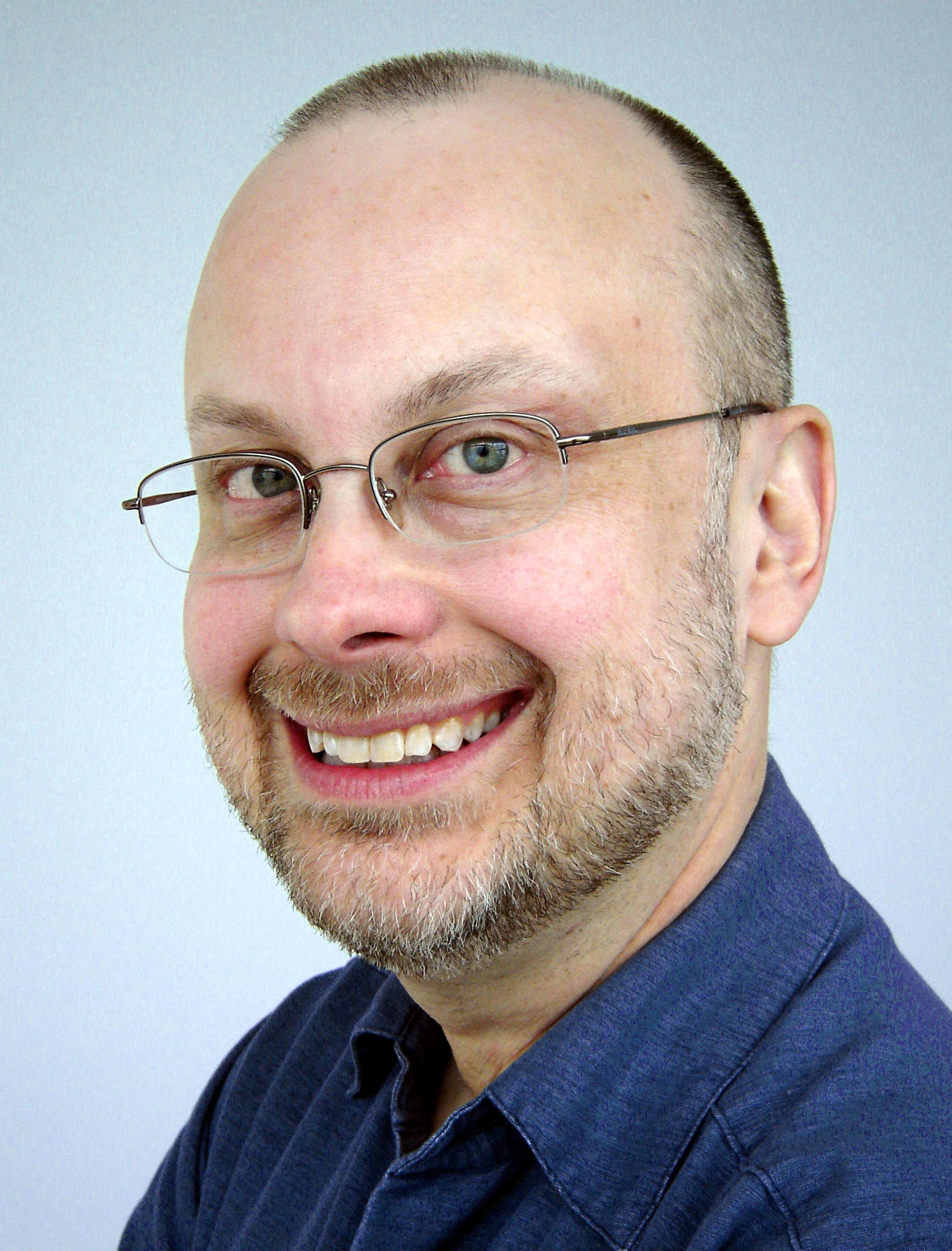
Robert J. Sawyer, 2005

Mary Shelley, ca. 1840

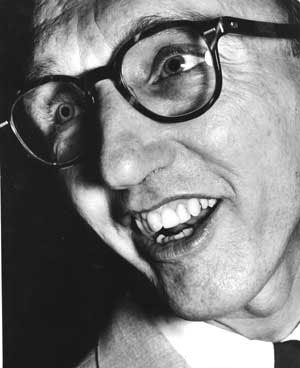
Cordwainer Smith (Paul Linebarger), 1953

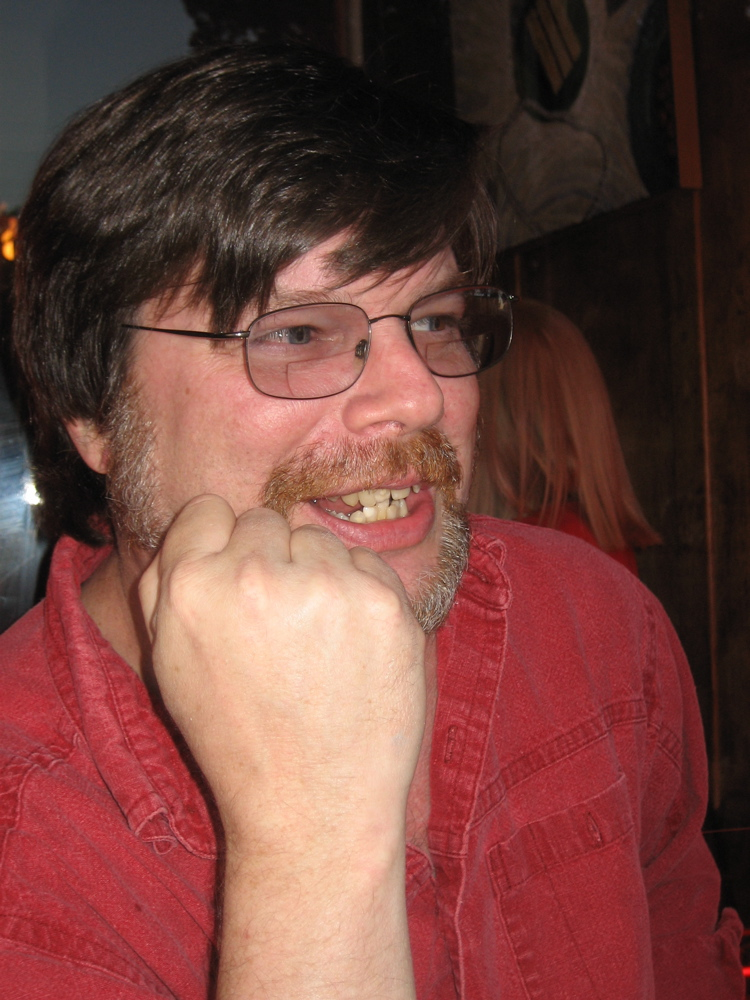
Allen Steele, ca. 2007

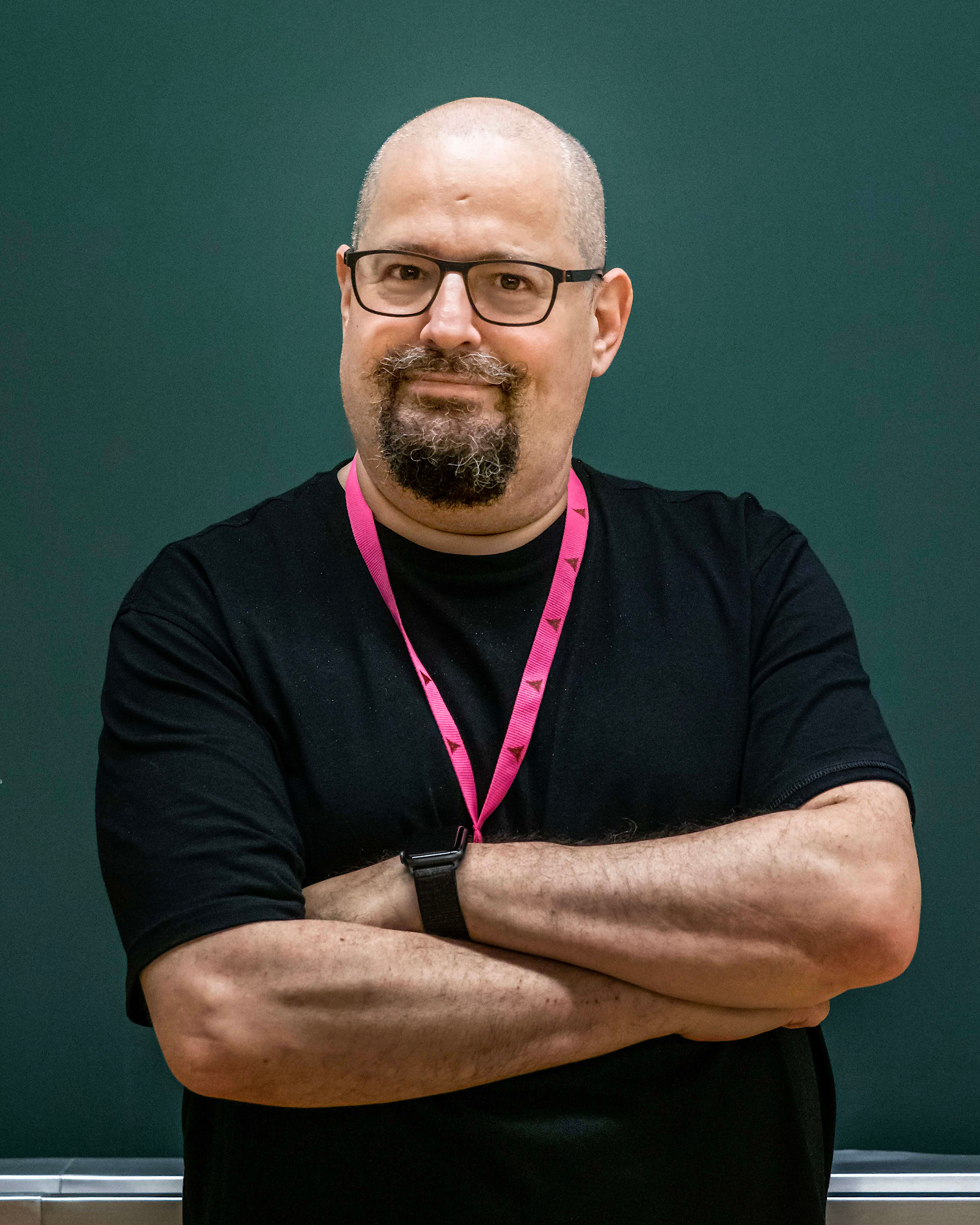
Charles Stross, 2019

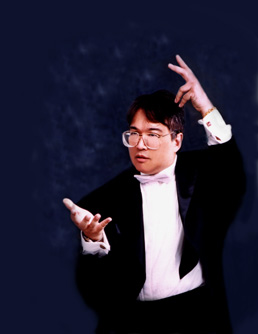
Somtow Sucharitkul, 2005

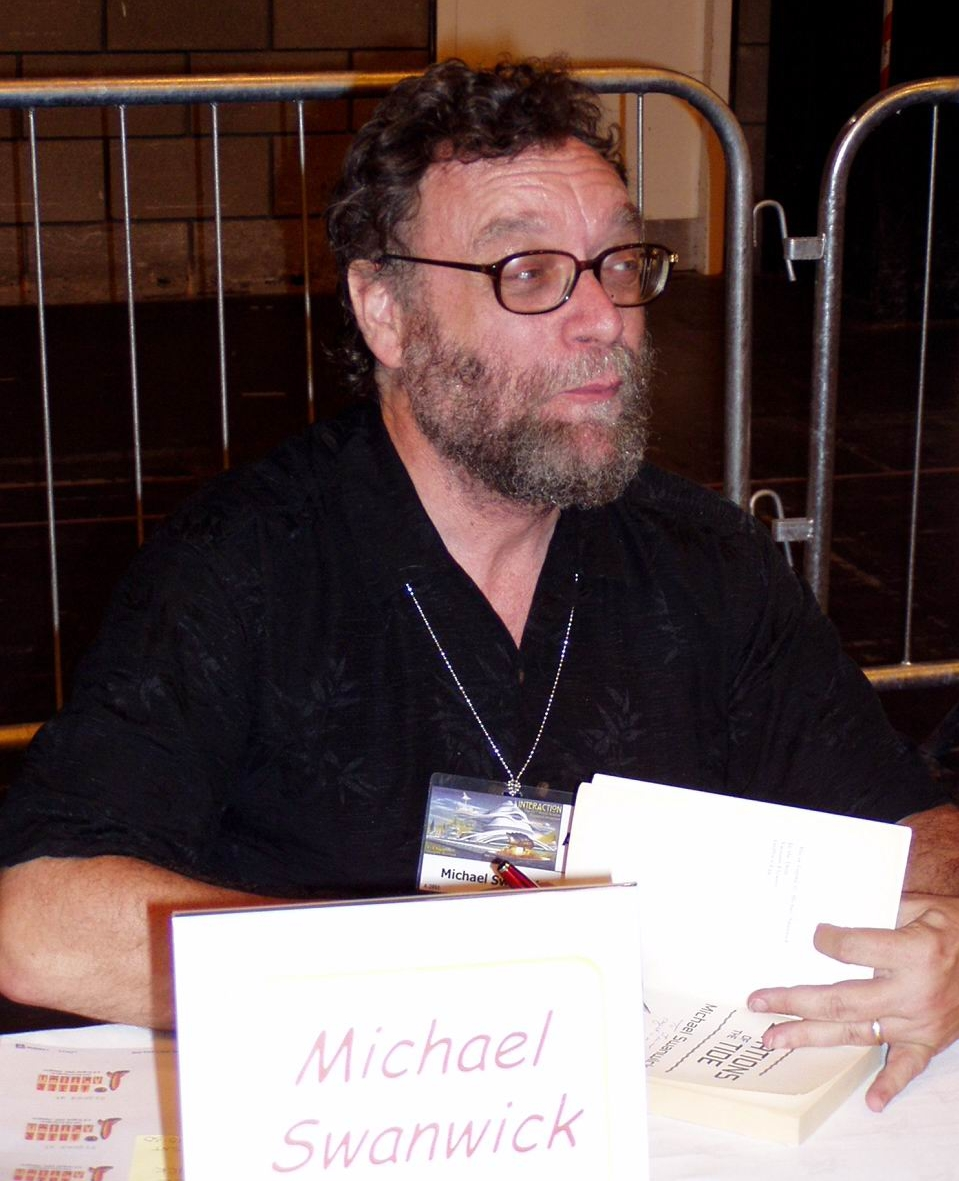
Michael Swanwick, 2005

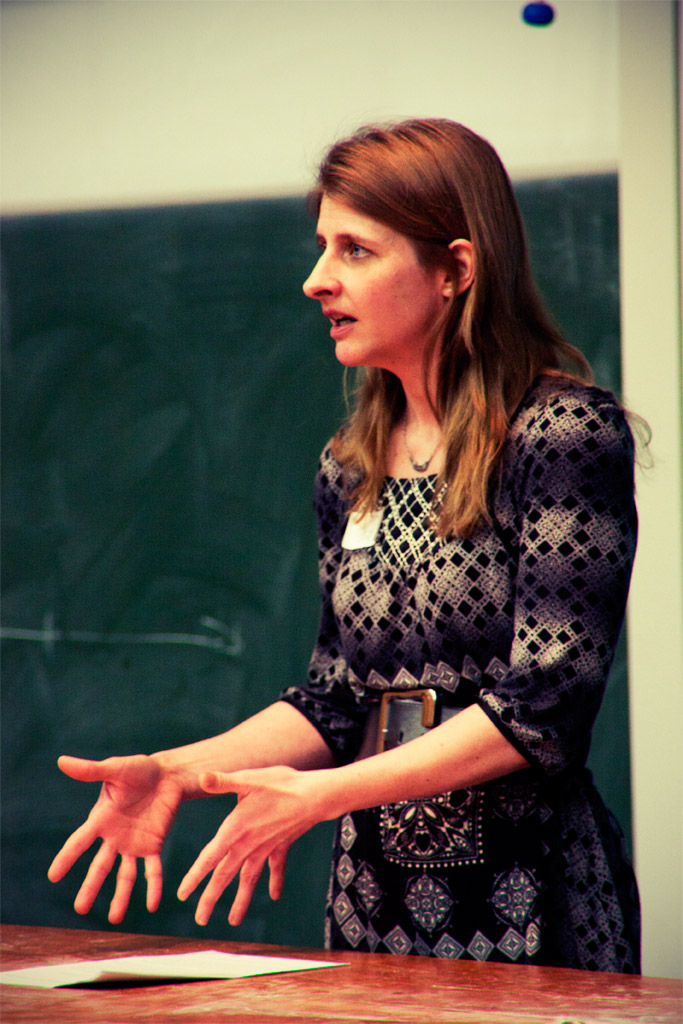
Tricia Sullivan, 2012

- Fred Saberhagen (1930–2007)
- Carl Sagan (1934–1996)
- Nick Sagan (born 1970)
- Margaret St. Clair (1911–1995) (also known as Idris Seabright)
- Don Sakers (1958–2021)
- Saki (1870–1916) (pseudonym of Hector Hugh Munro)
- Emilio Salgari (1862–1911)
- Sofia Samatar (born 1971)
- Ramiro Sanchiz (born 1978)
- Cathal Ó Sándair (1922–1996)
- Brandon Sanderson (born 1975)
- Domingo Santos (1941–2018) (pseudonym of Pedro Domingo Mutiñó)
- Pamela Sargent (born 1948)
- Al Sarrantonio (1952–2025)
- Robert J. Sawyer (born 1960)
- John Scalzi (born 1969)
- Nat Schachner (1895–1955)
- K. H. Scheer (1928–1991)
- Paul Scheerbart (1863–1915)
- Herman George Scheffauer (1876–1927)
- Joseph Schlossel (1902–1977)
- Bryan Thomas Schmidt (born 1969)
- Stanley Schmidt (born 1944)
- James H. Schmitz (1911–1974)
- Lawrence M. Schoen (born 1959)
- Karl Schroeder (born 1962)
- J. Neil Schulman (1953–2019)
- George H. Scithers (1929–2010)
- Thomas N. Scortia (1926–1986)
- Józef Sękowski (1800–1858)
- Arthur Sellings (1911–1968)
- Rod Serling (1924–1975)
- Garrett P. Serviss (1851–1929)
- Michael Shaara (1928–1988)
- William Shatner (born 1931)
- Richard S. Shaver (1907–1975)
- Bob Shaw (1931–1996)
- Larry Shaw (1924–1985)
- Nisi Shawl (born 1955)
- Kieran Shea (born 1965)
- Michael Shea (1946–2014)
- Robert Sheckley (1928–2005)
- Charles Sheffield (1935–2002)
- Mary Shelley (1797–1851)
- Lucius Shepard (1947–2014)
- Joel Shepherd (born 1974)
- David Sherman (1944–2022)
- T. L. Sherred (1915–1985)
- R. C. Sherriff (1896–1975)
- M. P. Shiel (1865–1947)
- Lewis Shiner (born 1950)
- Sharon Shinn (born 1957)
- Wilmar H. Shiras (1908–1990)
- John Shirley (born 1953)
- Shumil (born 1957)
- William Shunn (born 1967)
- Nevil Shute (1899–1960) (pseudonym of Nevil Shute Norway)
- Luís Filipe Silva (born 1969)
- Robert Silverberg (born 1935)
- Clifford D. Simak (1904–1988)
- Dan Simmons (1948–2026)
- Joe Simon (1913–2011)
- Johanna Sinisalo (born 1958)
- Curt Siodmak (1902–2000)
- Jack Skillingstead (born 1955)
- John Sladek (1937–2000)
- William Sleator (1945–2011)
- Henry Slesar (1927–2002)
- William Milligan Sloane III (1906–1974)
- Joan Slonczewski (born 1956)
- George Edgar Slusser (1939–2014)
- Clark Ashton Smith (1893–1961)
- Cordwainer Smith (1913–1966) (pseudonym of Paul M.A. Linebarger)
- E. E. Smith (1890–1965)
- Evelyn E. Smith (1922–2000)
- George H. Smith (1922–1996)
- George O. Smith (1911–1981)
- L. Neil Smith (1946–2021)
- Michael Marshall Smith (born 1965)
- Melinda Snodgrass (born 1951)
- Jerry Sohl (1913–2002)
- Martha Soukup (born 1959)
- Steven Spielberg (born 1946)
- Norman Spinrad (born 1940)
- Jacques Spitz (1896–1963)
- Nancy Springer (born 1948)
- Dana Stabenow (born 1952)
- Brian Stableford (1948–2024)
- Michael Stackpole (born 1957)
- Robert Stallman (1930–1980)
- Olaf Stapledon (1886–1950)
- Roman Frederick Starzl (1899–1976)
- Christopher Stasheff (1944–2018)
- John Steakley (1951–2010)
- Simon Stålenhag (born 1984)
- Allen Steele (born 1958)
- Angela Steinmüller (born 1941)
- Karlheinz Steinmüller (born 1950)
- Neal Stephenson (born 1959)
- Bruce Sterling (born 1954)
- Jacques Sternberg (1923–2006)
- Francis Stevens (1883–1948) (pseudonym of Gertrude Barrows Bennett)
- Marc Stiegler (born 1954)
- G. Harry Stine (1928–1997) (also known as Lee Correy)
- S. M. Stirling (born 1953)
- John E. Stith (born 1947)
- Giampietro Stocco (born 1961)
- Manning Lee Stokes (1911–1976)
- Sam Stone (fl. 2010–present)
- J. Michael Straczynski (born 1954)
- Charles Stross (born 1964)
- Arkady and Boris Strugatsky (1925–1991 and 1933–2012, respectively) (in Russian, Аркадий и Борис Стругацкие)
- Theodore Sturgeon (1918–1985) (pseudonym of Edward Hamilton Waldo)
- Somtow Sucharitkul (also known as S. P. Somtow) (born 1952)
- Sujatha (1935–2008)
- Tricia Sullivan (born 1968)
- Michael Swanwick (born 1950)
- Jonathan Swift (1667–1745)
- Michael Szameit (1950–2014)

== T ==
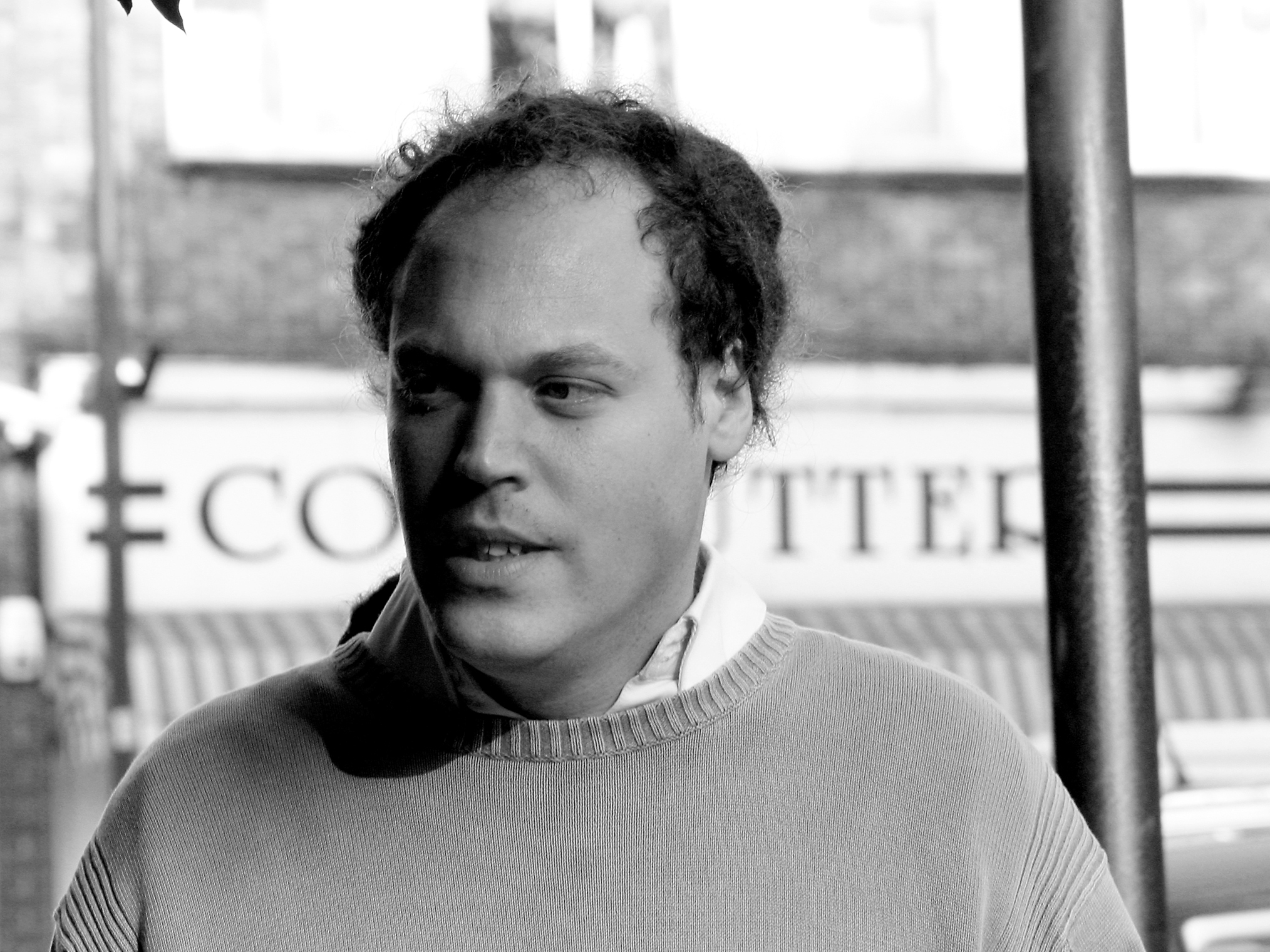
Lavie Tidhar, 2006

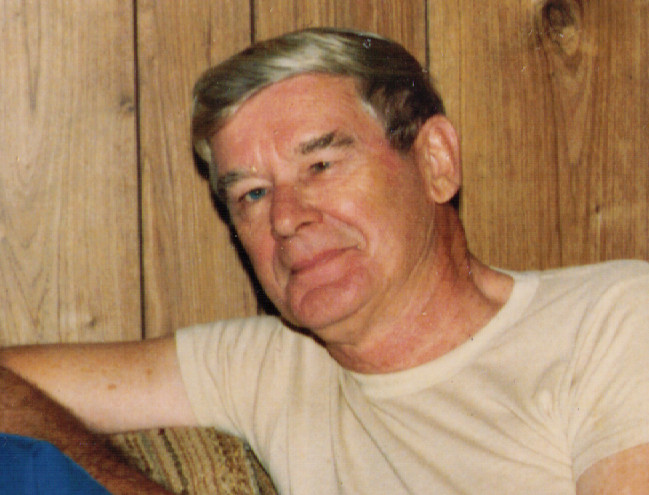
Wilson Tucker, ca. 1988

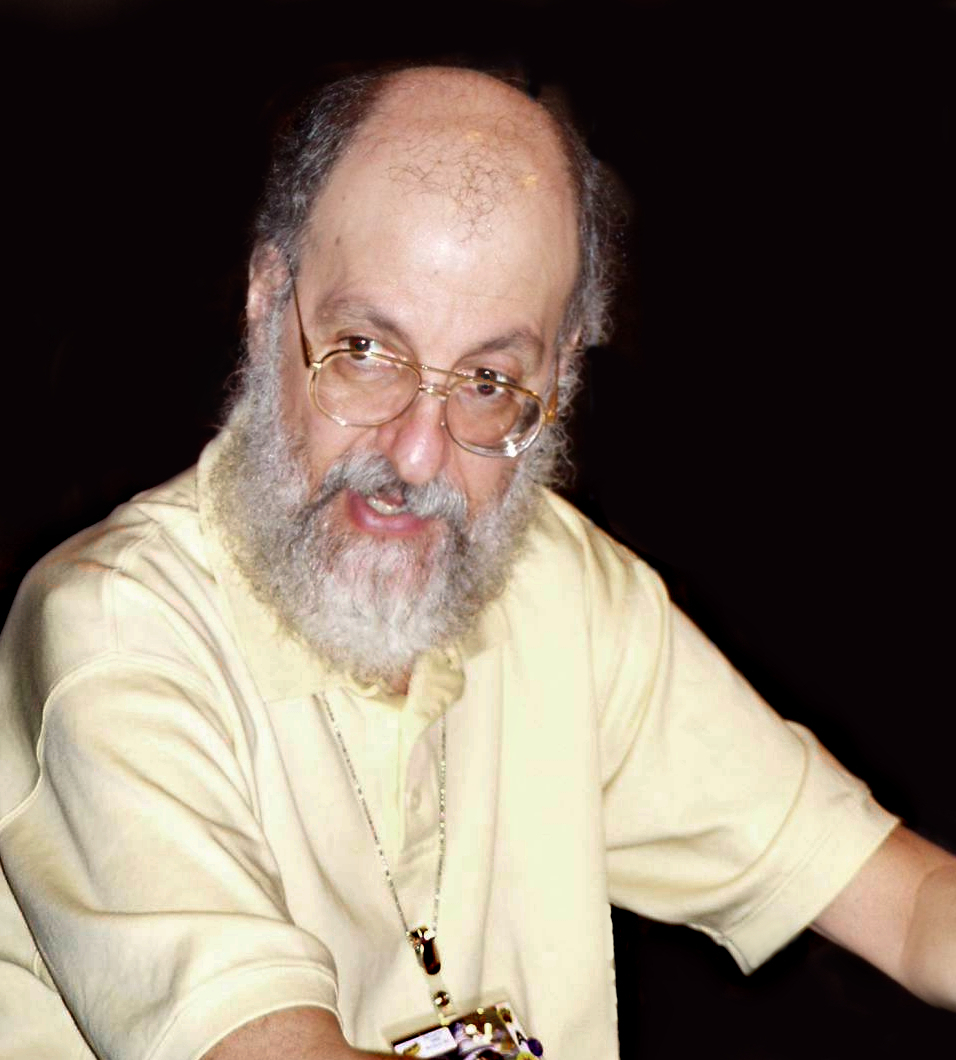
Harry Turtledove, 2005

- John Taine (1883–1960) (pseudonym of Eric Temple Bell)
- Stephen Tall (1908–1981) (pseudonym of Compton Newby Crook)
- Yoshiki Tanaka (born 1952)
- Charles R. Tanner (1896–1974)
- Andrius Tapinas (born 1977)
- Howard Tayler (born 1968)
- Dennis E. Taylor (fl. 2015–present)
- Travis S. Taylor (born 1968)
- Adrian Tchaikovsky (born 1972)
- Steve Rasnic Tem (born 1950)
- William F. Temple (1914–1989)
- Tais Teng (born 1952) (nom de plume of Thijs van Ebbenhorst Tengbergen)
- William Tenn (1920–2010) (pseudonym of Philip Klass)
- Sheri S. Tepper (1929–2016)
- Tom Terry (born 1963)
- Walter Tevis (1928–1984)
- Felix Thijssen (1933–2022)
- Theodore L. Thomas (1920–2005)
- Tade Thompson (fl. 2005–present)
- Robert Thurston (1936–2021)
- Lavie Tidhar (born 1976)
- Mark W. Tiedemann (born 1954)
- Patrick Tilley (1928–2020)
- James Tiptree Jr. (1915–1987) (pseudonym of Alice Sheldon)
- Arthur Tofte (1902–1980)
- Aleksei Nikolaevich Tolstoy (1882/3–1945) (in Russian Алексей Николаевич Толстой)
- Brad R. Torgersen (born 1974)
- Karen Traviss (fl. 2002–2017)
- Eugenia Triantafyllou (fl. 2017-present)
- F. Orlin Tremaine (1899–1956)
- Edwin Charles Tubb (1919–2010)
- George Tucker (1775–1861)
- Wilson Tucker (1914–2006)
- George Turner (1916–1997)
- Harry Turtledove (born 1949)
- Mary Turzillo (born 1940)
- Lisa Tuttle (born 1952)
- John Twelve Hawks (fl. 2005–2014)
- Kathy Tyers (born 1952)

== U ==
- Steven Utley (1948–2013)

== V ==
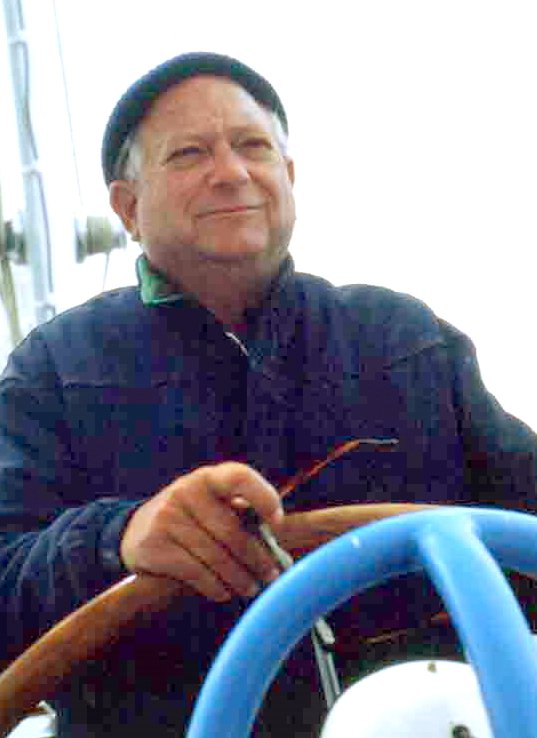
Jack Vance at the helm of his boat, early 1980s

- Catherynne M. Valente (born 1979)
- James Van Pelt (born 1954)
- Sydney J. Van Scyoc (1939–2023)
- A. E. van Vogt (1912–2000)
- Jack Vance (1916–2013)
- Jeff VanderMeer (born 1968)
- Robert E. Vardeman (born 1947)
- John Varley (1947–2025)
- Vladimir Vasilyev (born 1967)
- Vercors (1902–1991) (pseudonym of Jean Bruller)
- Jules Verne (1828–1905)
- Alpheus Hyatt Verrill (1871–1954)
- Pierre Versins (1923–2001)
- Harl Vincent (1893–1968)
- Joan D. Vinge (born 1948)
- Vernor Vinge (1944–2024)
- Paul Voermans (born 1960)
- Julius Vogel (1835–1899)
- Voltaire (1694–1778)
- Elisabeth Vonarburg (born 1947)
- Kurt Vonnegut (1922–2007)

== W ==
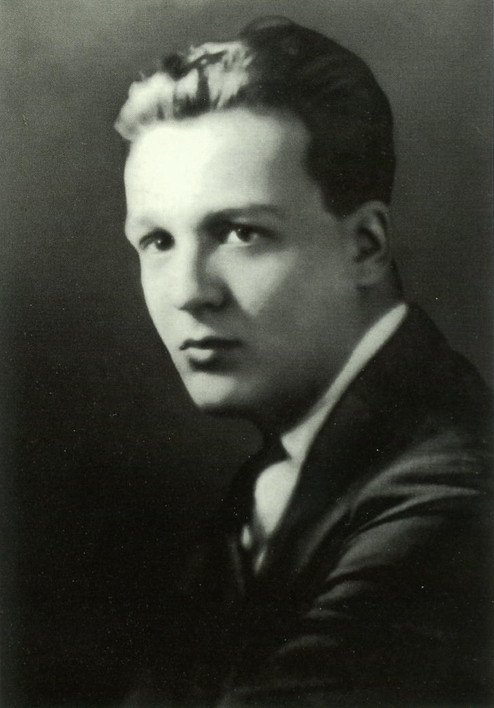
Stanley G. Weinbaum

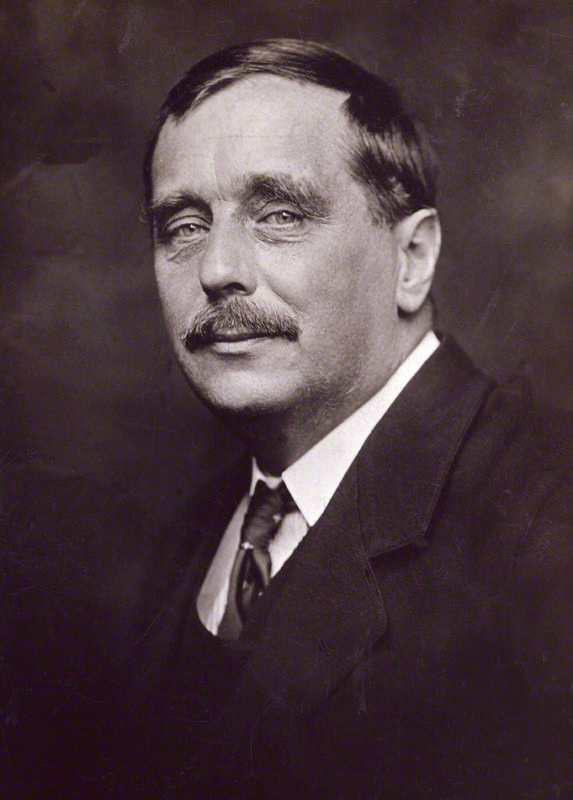
H. G. Wells, 1920

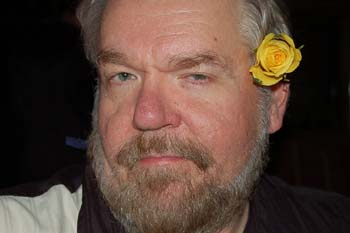
Walter Jon Williams, 2006

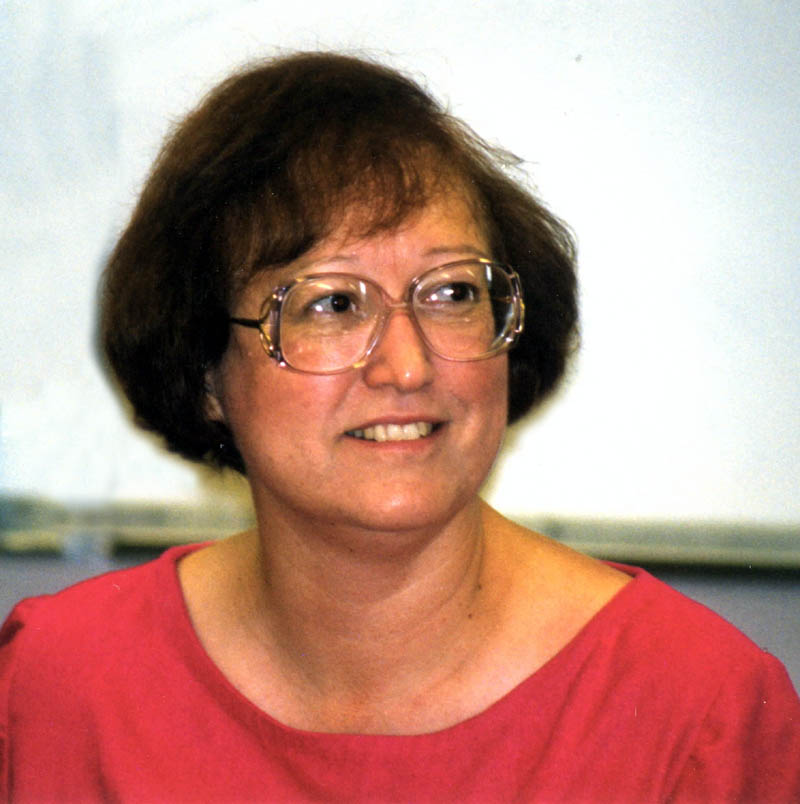
Connie Willis, 1998

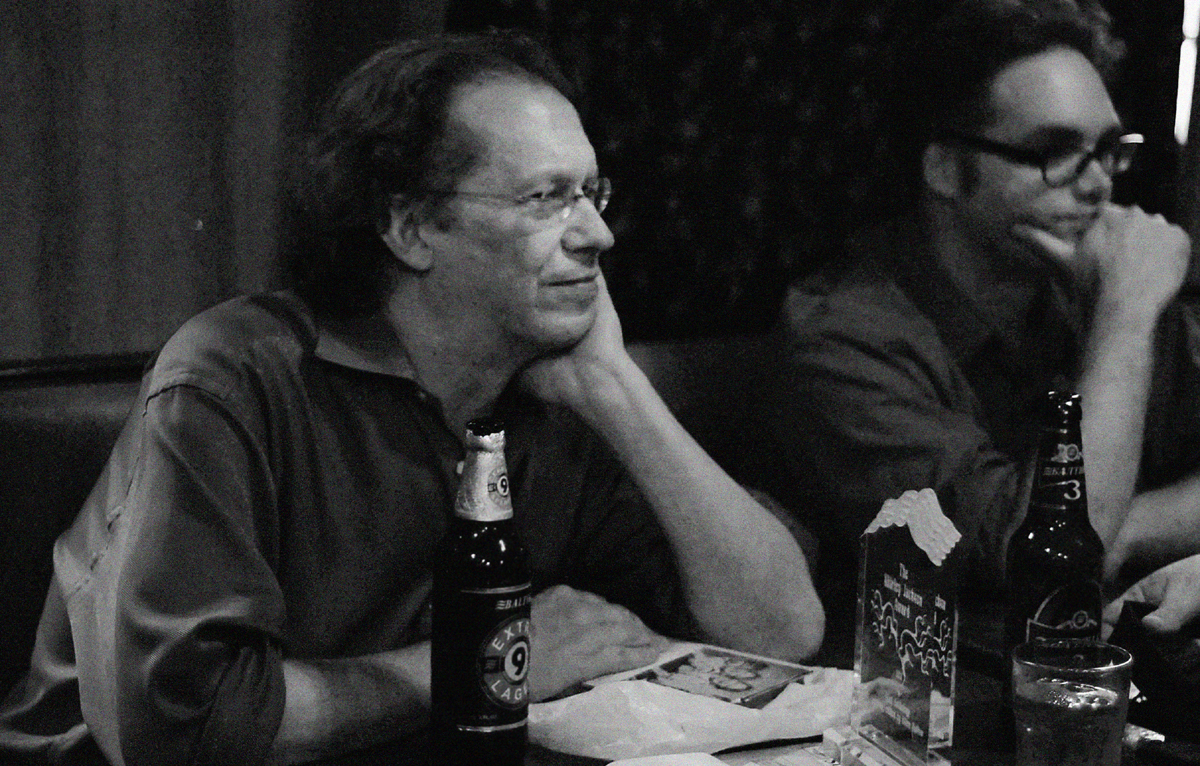
Jack Womack at the KGB Bar, NYC, 2008

- Karl Edward Wagner (1945–1994)
- Roland C. Wagner (1960–2012)
- Howard Waldrop (1946–2024)
- Edgar Wallace (1875–1932)
- F. L. Wallace (1915–2004) (also known as Floyd Wallace)
- Ian Wallace (1912–1998)
- Hugh Walters (1910–1993)
- Bryce Walton (1918–1988)
- Jo Walton (born 1964)
- Donald Wandrei (1908–1987)
- Ian Watson (1943–2026)
- Lawrence Watt-Evans (born 1954)
- Peter Watts (born 1958)
- Don Webb (born 1960)
- David Weber (born 1952)
- Stanley G. Weinbaum (1902–1935)
- Richard M. Weiner (1930–2020)
- Andy Weir (born 1972)
- Jan Weiss (1892–1972)
- Manly Wade Wellman (1903–1986)
- Angus Wells (1943–2006)
- Basil Wells (1912–2003)
- Dan Wells (born 1977)
- H. G. Wells (1866–1946)
- Martha Wells (born 1964)
- Chuck Wendig (born 1976)
- K. D. Wentworth (1951–2012)
- Bernard Werber (born 1961)
- Wallace West (1900–1980)
- Scott Westerfeld (born 1963)
- Suzanne Weyn (born 1955)
- Dennis Wheatley (1897–1977)
- Alex White (born 1981)
- James White (1928–1999)
- Steve White (1946–2025)
- Ted White (born 1938)
- Sonny Whitelaw (born 1956)
- Cherry Wilder (1930–2002)
- Kate Wilhelm (1928–2018)
- Liz Williams (born 1965)
- Lynda Williams (born 1958)
- Rob Williams
- Robert Moore Williams (1907–1977)
- Sean Williams (born 1967)
- Tad Williams (born 1957)
- Walter Jon Williams (born 1953)
- Jack Williamson (1908–2006)
- Michael Z. Williamson (born 1967)
- Connie Willis (born 1945)
- Colin Wilson (1931–2013)
- D. Harlan Wilson (born 1971)
- F. Paul Wilson (born 1946)
- Richard Wilson (1920–1987)
- Robert Anton Wilson (1932–2007)
- Robert Charles Wilson (born 1953)
- David Wingrove (born 1954)
- Russell R. Winterbotham (1904–1971)
- Adam Wiśniewski-Snerg (1937–1995)
- Otto Witt (1875–1923)
- Edmund Wnuk-Lipinski (1944–2015)
- Bernard Wolfe (1915–1985)
- Gene Wolfe (1931–2019)
- Donald A. Wollheim (1914–1990) (various pseudonyms)
- Jack Womack (born 1956)
- John C. Wright (born 1961)
- S. Fowler Wright (1874–1965)
- Stefan Wul (1922–2003) (pseudonym of Pierre Pairault)
- James Wylder (born 1989)
- Philip Wylie (1902–1971)
- John Wyndham (1903–1969) (pseudonym of John Wyndham Parkes Lucas Beynon Harris)

== Y ==
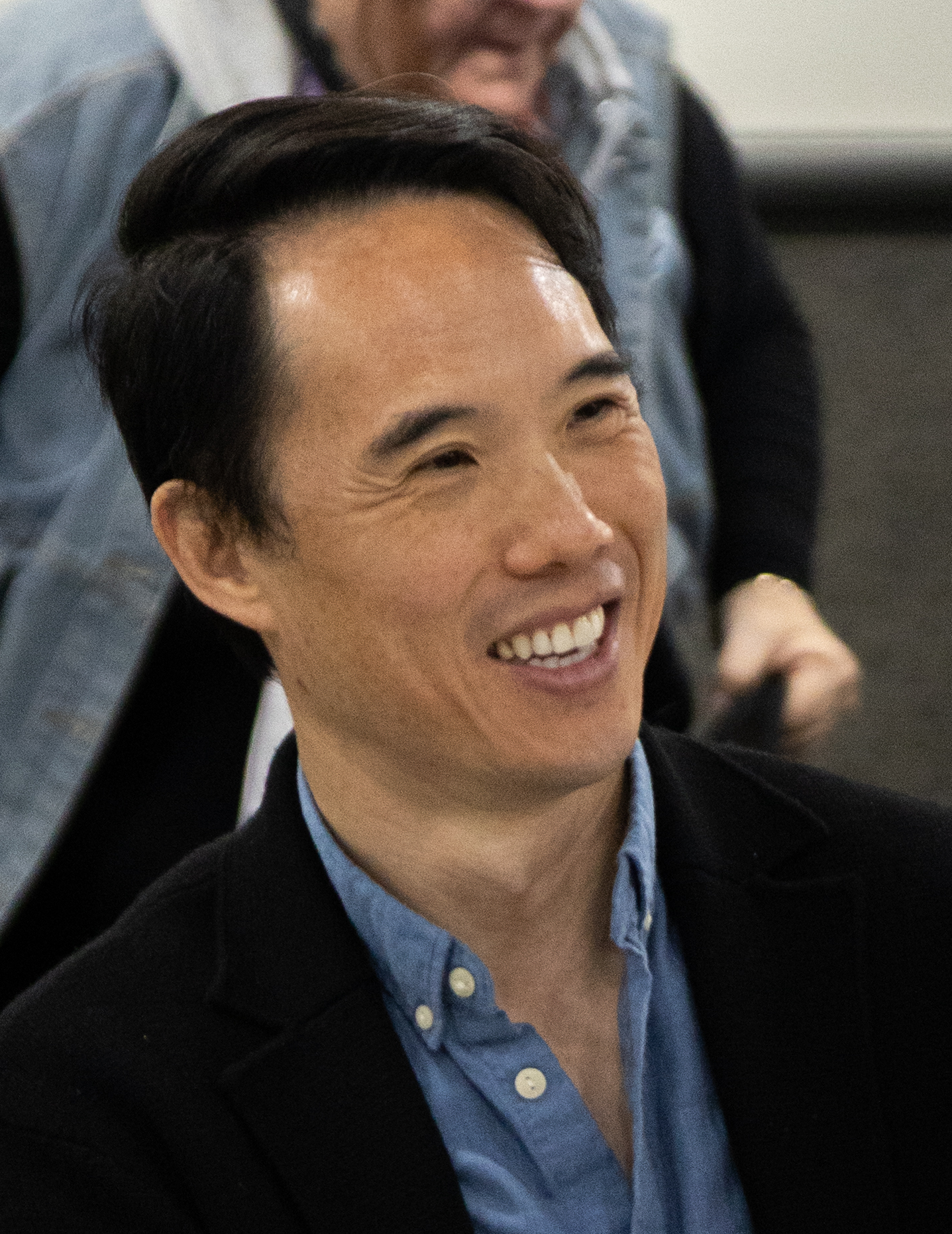
Charles Yu, 2025

- Neon Yang
- Nir Yaniv (born 1972)
- Tetsu Yano (1923–2004)
- Chelsea Quinn Yarbro (1942–2025)
- Yi Kŭmch'ŏl
- Jun'ya Yokota (1945–2019)
- Jane Yolen (1939–2026)
- Robert Franklin Young (1915–1986)
- Charles Yu (born 1976)

== Z ==
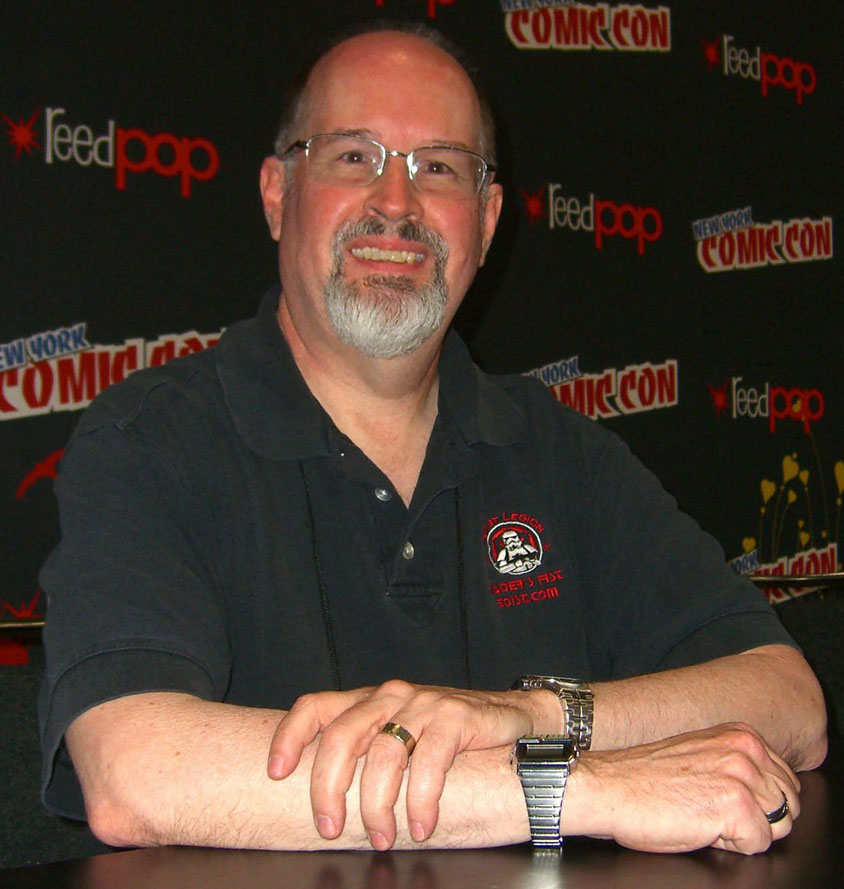
Timothy Zahn, 2012

- Arthur Leo Zagat (1896–1949)
- Timothy Zahn (born 1951)
- Janusz Zajdel (1938–1985)
- Yevgeny Zamyatin (1884–1937)
- George Zebrowski (1945–2024)
- Roger Zelazny (1937–1995)
- Alexander Zelenyj (fl. 2005–present)
- Tully Zetford (pseudonym of Kenneth Bulmer)
- Sarah Zettel (born 1966)
- Andrzej Ziemiański (born 1960)
- Rafal A. Ziemkiewicz (born 1964)
- Aleksandar Ziljak (born 1963)
- Werner Zillig (born 1949)
- David Zindell (born 1952)
- Zoran Živković (born 1948)
- Pamela Zoline (born 1941)
- Alexander Zorich (born 1973) (joint pseudonym of Yana Botsman and Dmitry Gordevsky)
- Joseph Zornado (fl. 2000–2019)
- Jerzy Żuławski (1874–1915)

== See also ==
- Black science fiction
- Category:Science fiction writers by nationality
- Internet Speculative Fiction DataBase
- List of fantasy authors
- List of horror fiction authors
- List of military science fiction works and authors
- List of Romanian science fiction writers
- List of science fiction editors
- Lists of authors
- Novelists
- Timeline of science fiction
- Women science fiction authors
