= List of Wild Cards books and short stories =

Wild Cards is a series of science fiction superhero shared universe anthologies, mosaic novels, and solo novels written by a collection of authors known as the Wild Cards Trust and edited by George R. R. Martin and Melinda M. Snodgrass. Set largely during an alternate history of post–World War II United States, the series follows humans who contracted the Wild Card virus, an alien virus that rewrites DNA and mutates survivors; those who acquire minor or crippling physical conditions are known as Jokers, and those who acquire superhuman abilities are known as Aces.

As of the publication of Aces Full in November 2025, the series consists of thirty-four books. Wild Cards began publication through Bantam Books, under its Spectra imprint, in January 1987. Bantam published the series until 1993 and released twelve installments. Baen Books published three books from 1993 to 1995. From 2002 to 2005, ibooks Inc. published two more installments, including one solo novel.

Starting in 2008, Wild Cards was published by Tor Books, an imprint under Macmillan Publishers. By August 2022, Tor Books had released thirteen novels. Tor also reprinted several earlier novels. Reprinting rights to the first eight novels were acquired by ibooks Inc. in 2000. The company reissued the first six novels before declaring Chapter 7 bankruptcy shortly after the death of founder Byron Preiss; ibooks' assets were acquired by Brick Tower Press. As of November 2021, Tor Books reprinted the first, twelve, sixteenth, and seventeenth novels.

Wild Cards is currently published by Bantam Books, with three novels released between 2023 and 2025.

Marvel Entertainment has published two Wild Cards miniseries, thirty-two years apart. The first, released via their Epic Comics imprint, was published from September to December 1990 and featured an original storyline based on events that occurred in the early novels. A second limited series, this time adapting stories from the first novel, ran from June through October 2022.

== Books ==
=== Bantam Books (1987–1993) ===
Bantam Books, under its Spectra imprint, published twelve books between 1987 and 1993, including two solo novels written by Melinda M. Snodgrass and Victor Milán.

No.	Title	Original release	ibooks Inc. reprint release	Tor Books release
1	Wild Cards; Edited by George R. R. Martin	January 1987; ISBN 978-0-553-26190-5	July 31, 2001; ISBN 978-0-7434-2380-9	November 23, 2010; ISBN 978-0-7653-2615-7
"Prologue" by Martin; "Thirty Minutes Over Broadway!" by Howard Waldrop; "The Sleeper" by Roger Zelazny; "Witness" by Walter Jon Williams; "Degradation Rites" by Melinda M. Snodgrass; "Interlude One" by Martin; "Captain Cathode and the Secret Ace" by Michael Cassutt (Note: The 2010 Tor Books reprint of Wild Cards, originally published in 1987 by Bantam Books, added stories by Michael Cassut, David D. Levine, and Carrie Vaughn, as well as a story with no listed author.); "Powers" by David D. Levine; "Shell Games" by Martin; "Interlude Two" by Martin; "The Long, Dark Night of Fortunato" by Lewis Shiner; "Transfigurations" by Victor Milán; "Interlude Three" by Martin; "Down Deep" by Edward Bryant and Leanne C. Harper; "Interlude Four" by Martin; "Strings" by Stephen Leigh (as S. L Farrell); "Interlude Five" by Martin; "Ghost Girl Takes Manhattan" by Carrie Vaughn; "Comes a Hunter" by John J. Miller; "Epilogue: Third Generation" by Shiner; "Appendix: The Science of the Wild Card Virus" by Milán; "Excerpts from the Minutes of the American Metabiological Society Conference on Metahuman Abilities"
2	Aces High; Edited by Martin	April 1987; ISBN 978-0-553-26464-7	October 2001; ISBN 978-1-59687-283-7	December 20, 2011; ISBN 978-0-7653-2616-4
"Pennies From Hell" by Shiner; "Jube" by Martin; "Unto the Sixth Generation" by Williams; "Ashes to Ashes" by Zelazny; "If Looks Could Kill" by Walton Simons; "Winter's Chill" by Martin; "Relative Difficulties" by Snodgrass; "With a Little Help From His Friends" by Milán; "By Lost Ways" by Pat Cadigan; "Mr. Koyama's Comet" by Williams; "Half Past Dead" by Miller
3 (Note: Several novels attribute authors by narrating character. Those novels are Jokers Wild, Ace in the Hole, Dead Man's Hand, Dealer's Choice, Black Trump, Suicide Kings, and High Stakes.)	Jokers Wild; Edited by Martin	October 1987; ISBN 978-0-553-26699-3	February 2002; ISBN 978-1-59687-284-4	February 11, 2014; ISBN 978-0-7653-2617-1
Bagabond by Harper; Fortunato by Shiner; Jennifer "Wraith" Maloy by Miller; Jack "Sewer Jack" Robicheaux by Bryant; Roulette by Snodgrass; James "Demise" Spector by Simons; Hiram Worchester by Martin
4	Aces Abroad; Edited by Martin	May 1988; ISBN 978-0-553-27628-2	August 27, 2002; ISBN 978-0-7434-5241-0	January 13, 2015; ISBN 978-0-7653-3558-6
"The Tint of Hatred" by Leigh (as S. L. Farrell); "From the Journal of Xavier Desmond" by Martin; "Beasts of Burden" by Miller; "Blood Rights" by Harper; "Warts and All" by Kevin Andrew Murphy (Note: The 2015 Tor Books reprint of Aces Abroad, originally published in 1988 by Bantam Books, added stories by Kevin Andrew Murphy and Carrie Vaughn.); "Down by The Nile" by Gail Gerstner-Miller; "The Teardrop of India" by Simons; "Down in the Dreamtime" by Bryant; "Zero Hour" by Shiner; "Always Spring in Prague" by Vaughn; "Puppets" by Milán; "Mirrors of The Soul" by Snodgrass; "Legends" by Cassutt
5	Down and Dirty; Edited by Martin	November 1988; ISBN 978-0-553-27463-9	January 7, 2003	October 27, 2015; ISBN 978-0-7653-3559-3
"Only the Dead Know Jokertown" by Miller; "All the King's Horses" by Martin; "Concerto for Siren and Serotonin" by Zelazny; "Breakdown" by Harper; "Jesus Was an Ace" by Arthur Byron Cover; "Blood Ties" by Snodgrass; "The Second Coming of Buddy Holly" by Bryant; "The Hue of a Mind" by Leigh; "Addicted to Love" by Cadigan; "Takedown" by Harper; "Mortality" by Williams
6	Ace in the Hole; Edited by Martin	January 1990; ISBN 978-0-553-28253-5	February 25, 2003; ISBN 978-0-7434-5837-5	October 4, 2016; ISBN 978-0-7653-3560-9
Jack "Golden Boy" Braun by Williams; Gregg Hartmann by Leigh; Mackie "Mack the Knife" Messer by Milán; Sara Morgenstern by Milán; James "Demise" Spector by Simons; Dr. Tachyon by Snodgrass
7	Dead Man's Hand; Edited by Martin	July 1990; ISBN 978-0-553-28569-7	—N/a	June 13, 2017
Daniel "Yeoman" Brennan by Miller; Jay "Popinjay" Ackroyd by Martin
8	One-Eyed Jacks; Edited by Martin	January 1991; ISBN 978-0-553-28852-0	—N/a	August 7, 2018
"Nobody's Girl" by Simons; "The Tower of Gold and Amber" by Murphy (Note: The 2018 Tor Books reprint of One-Eyed Jacks, originally published in 1991 by Bantam Books, added stories by Kevin Andrew Murphy and Carrie Vaughn.); "Luck Be A Lady" by Chris Claremont; "Horses" by Shiner; "Snow Dragon" by William F. Wu; "Noawadays Clancy Can't Even Sing" by Milán; "A Broken Thread in a Dark Room" by Vaughn; "Sixteen Candles" by Leigh; "The Devil's Triangle" by Snodgrass; "Dead Heart Beating" by Miller
9	Jokertown Shuffle; Edited by Martin	August 1991; ISBN 978-0-553-29174-2	—N/a	April 30, 2019
"The Temptation of Hieronymous Bloat" by Leigh; "And Hope to Die" by Miller; "The Unintended" by Cherie Priest (Note: The 2019 Tor Books reprint of Jokertown Shuffle, originally published in 1991 by Bantam Books, added stories by Cherie Priest and Carrie Vaughn.); "Lovers" by Snodgrass; "Madmen Across the Water" by Milán; "Unraveling" by Vaughn; "While Night's Black Agents to Their Prey Do Rouse" by Williams; "Riders" by Shiner; "Nobody Does It Alone" by Simons
10	Double Solitaire; Written by Snodgrass and edited by Martin	March 1992; ISBN 978-0-553-29493-4	—N/a	December 3, 2019
11	Dealer's Choice; Edited by Martin	October 1992; ISBN 978-0-553-29161-2	—N/a	September 1, 2020
Bloat by Leigh; Modular Man by Williams; Billy "Carnifex" Ray by Miller; Tom "The Great and Powerful Turtle" Tudbury by Martin; Zelda "Bodysnatcher" by Martin; Wyungare by Bryant
12	Turn of the Cards; Written by Milán and edited by Martin	January 1993; ISBN 978-0-553-56152-4	—N/a	November 9, 2021

=== Baen Books (1993–1995) ===
Baen Books published a new triad between 1993 and 1995 subtitled of a New Cycle. In 2002, Martin commented that he felt the triad was creatively "three of the strongest volumes Wild Cards ever had" and that the series "came back strong" after stumbling with a previous storyline; however, he conceded that the triad was "very dark", acknowledging it was a commonly voiced complaint, and that he felt switching publishers was a mistake.

No.	Title	Original release
13	Card Sharks; Edited by Martin	February 1993; ISBN 978-0-671-72159-6
"The Ashes of Memory" by Leigh; "Till I Kissed You" by Wu; "The Crooked Man" by Snodgrass; "A Method of Reaching Extreme Altitudes" by Cassutt; "A Wind From Khorasan" by Milán; "The Long Sleep" by Zelazny; "Cursum Perficio" by Murphy; "The Lamia's Tale" by Laura J. Mixon
14	Marked Cards; Edited by Martin	March 1994; ISBN 978-0-671-72212-8
"The Color of His Skin" by Leigh; "Two of a Kind" by Simons; "My Sweet Lord" by Milán; "Paths of Silence and of Night" by Harper; "Feeding Frenzy" by Williams; "A Breath of Life" by Sage Walker; "A Dose of Reality" by Mixon and Snodgrass
15	Black Trump (Note: Re-released in 2025 retitled "Showdown"); Edited by Martin	July 1995; ISBN 978-0-671-87679-1
Gregg Hartmann" by Leigh; Jack "Popinjay" Ackroyd by Martin; Mark "Cap'n Trip" Meadows by Milán; Billy "Carnifex" Ray by Miller; Zoe Harris by Walker

=== ibooks Inc. (2002–2006) ===
In 2000, ibooks Inc. purchased two new installments and the rights to reprint the first eight books of the series; the two new books were published between 2002 and 2006, including a solo novel by John J. Miller. The company filed for Chapter 7 bankruptcy in July 2005, shortly after the death of founder Byron Preiss. In December 2006, J. Bolyston & Co. Publishers, parent company of the Brick Tower Press imprint, acquired all of Preiss' assets, including those of ibooks, for $125,000. Brick Tower Press offered e-book versions of its titles, including Deuces Down and Death Draws Five, via Humble Bundle in February 2016.

No.	Title	Original release	Tor Books release
16	Deuces Down; Edited by Martin	June 25, 2002; ISBN 978-0-7434-4505-4	January 5, 2021
"Storming Space" by Cassutt; "Four Days in October" by Miller; "Walking the Floor Over You" by Simons; "A Face for the Cutting Room Floor" by Snodgrass; "Father Henry's Little Miracle" by Daniel Abraham; "Promises" by Leigh; "With a Flourish and a Flair" by Murphy
17	Death Draws Five; Written by Miller and edited by Martin	February 1, 2006; ISBN 978-1-59687-297-4	November 9, 2021

=== Tor Books (2008–2022) ===
Tor Books, an imprint under Macmillan Publishers, published the series in both print and e-book format, releasing thirteen new installments from November 2008 to August 2022.

No.	Title	Original release
18	Inside Straight; Edited by Martin with assistance from Snodgrass	January 22, 2008; ISBN 978-0-641-91260-3
"Johnathan Hive" by Abraham; "Dark of the Moon" by Snodgrass; "Chosen Ones" by Vaughn; "Looking for Jetboy" by Cassutt; "Metagames" by Caroline Spector; "Star Power" by Snodgrass; "Wakes the Lion" by Miller; "Crusader" by Martin; "The Tin Man's Lament" by Ian Tregillis; "Incidental Music for Heroes" by Leigh (as S. L. Farrell); "Blood on the Sun" by Snodgrass
19	Busted Flush; Edited by Martin with assistance from Snodgrass	December 9, 2008; ISBN 978-0-7653-1782-7
"Double Helix" by Snodgrass; "Coulda, Woulda, Shoulda" by Spector; "Just Cause" by Vaughn; "Political Science" by Tregillis and Simons; "The Tears of Nepthys" by Murphy; "Volunteers of America" by Milán; "Dirge in a Major Key" by Leigh (as S. L. Farrell); "Mortality's Strong Hand" by Miller; "Won't Get Fooled Again" by Milán; "A Hard Rain Is A'Going to Fall" by Milán
20	Suicide Kings; Edited by Martin with assistance from Snodgrass	December 22, 2009; ISBN 978-0-7653-1783-4
Jerusha "Gardener" Carter by Leigh (as S. L. Farrell); Wally "Rustbelt" Gunderson by Tregillis; Noel "Double Helix" Matthews by Snodgrass; Mark "Cap'n Trips" Meadows by Milán; Michelle "Amazing Bubbles" Pond by Spector; Johnathan "Bugsy" Tipton-Clarke by Abraham; Tom "The Radical" Weathers by Milán
21	Fort Freak; Edited by Martin with assistance from Snodgrass	June 21, 2011; ISBN 978-0-7653-2570-9
"The Rat Race" by Cherie Priest; "The Rook" by Snodgrass; "Faith" by Miller; "Snake Up Above/Snake in the Hole/Snake on Fire" by David Anthony Durham; "...And All the Sinners Saints" by Milán and Ty Franck; "Sanctuary" by Mary Anne Mohanraj; "Hope We Die Before We Get Old" by Leigh; "More!" by Paul Cornell; "The Straight Man" by Murphy
22	Lowball; Edited by Martin and Snodgrass	November 4, 2014; ISBN 978-0-7653-3195-3
"The Big Bleed" by Cassutt; "Those About to Die..." by Durham; "Galahad in Blue" by Snodgrass; "Ties That Bind" by Mohanraj; "Cry Wolf" by David D. Levine; "Road Kill" by Williams; "Once More, for Old Times' Sake" by Vaughn; "No Parking..." by Tregillis
23	High Stakes; Edited by Martin and Snodgrass	August 30, 2016; ISBN 978-0-7653-3562-3
Marcus "Infamous Black Tongue" Morgan by Durham; Barbara "Babel" Baden by Leigh; Bathsheeba "The Midnight Angel" Fox by Miller; Francis Xavier "Franny" Black by Snodgrass; Michelle "Amazing Bubbles" Pond by Spector; Mollie "Tesseract" Steunenberg by Tregillis
24	Mississippi Roll; Edited by Martin and Snodgrass	December 5, 2017; ISBN 978-0-7653-9052-3
"In the Shadow of Tall Stacks" by Leigh; "Wingless Angels" by Miller; "A Big Break in the Small Time" by Vaughn; "Death on the Water" by Priest; "Find the Lady" by Murphy; "Under the Arch" by Levine
25	Low Chicago; Edited by Martin	June 12, 2018
A mosaic novel edited by George R. R. Martin assisted by Melinda M. Snodgrass. There are stories from eight authors that were woven into the novel. The stories, in the order of their first appearance in the novel are: "A Long Night at the Palmer House" by John Jos. Miller; "Down the Rabbit Hole" by Kevin Andrew Murphy; "The Motherfucking Apotheosis of Todd Motherfucking Taszycki" by Christopher Rowe; "A Bit of a Dinosaur" by Paul Cornell; "Stripes" by Marko Kloos; "The Sister in the Streets" by Melinda M. Snodgrass; "A Beautiful Façade" by Mary Anne Mohanraj; "Meathooks on Ice" by Saladin Ahmed
26	Texas Hold 'Em	November 6, 2018
A mosaic novel edited by George R. R. Martin assisted by Melinda M. Snodgrass. There are stories from seven authors that were woven into the novel. The stories, in the order of their first appearance in the novel are: "Bubbles and the Band Trip" by Caroline Spector; "The Secret Life of Rubberband" by Max Gladstone; "Jade Blossom's Brew" by William F. Wu; "Beats, Bugs, and Boys" by Diana Rowland; "Dust and the Darkness" by Victor Milán; "Is Nobody Going to San Antone?" by Walton Simons; "Drop City" by David Anthony Durham
27	Knaves Over Queens; Edited by Martin with assistance from Snodgrass	August 13, 2019
"A Flint Lies in the Mud" by Murphy; "The Coming of the Crow" by Peadar Ó Guilín; "But a Flint Holds Fire" by Murphy; "Needles and Pins" by Caroline Spector; "Night Orders by Cornell; "Police On My Back" by Charles Stross; "Probationary" by Marko Kloos; "Twisted Logic" by Peter Newman; "The Cracks in the City" by Ó Guilín; "The Ceremony of Innocence" by Snodgrass; "How to Turn a Girl to Stone" by Emma Newman; "The Visitor" by Mark Lawrence; "Feeding on the Entrails" by Ó Guilín
28	Joker Moon; Edited by Martin with assistance from Snodgrass	July 6, 2021
"The Moon Maid" by Mary Anne Mohanraj; "Flat Man" by Steve Perrin; "Within that House Secure" by Christopher Rowe; "Ghost of a Chance" by Steve Perrin; "Have Spaceship, Will Travel" by Michael Cassutt; "Star Ghost" by Steve Perrin; "Luna Incognita" by Leo Kenden; "The Sands of Mourning" by Caroline Spector; "Diggers" by David D. Levine; "Dreamers of the Day" by Melinda M. Snodgrass; "Fatal Error" by Victor Milán and John Jos. Miller; "Journey's End" by Walton Simons
29	Three Kings; Edited by Snodgrass with assistance from Martin	March 15, 2022
There are stories from five authors that were woven into the novel.: Mary Anne Mohanraj; Peter Newman; Peadar Ó Guilín; Melinda M. Snodgrass; Caroline Spector
30	Full House; Edited by Martin with assistance from Snodgrass	August 2, 2022
Collects ten stories that had been previously published only on Tor's website or in anthologies outside the Wild Cards series.: "When We Were Heroes" by Daniel Abraham; "Evernight" by Victor Milán; "Lies My Mother Told Me" by Caroline Spector; "Nuestra Senora de la Esperanza" by Carrie Vaughn; "Discards" by David D. Levine; "The Elephant in the Room" by Paul Cornell; "When the Devil Drives" by Melinda M. Snodgrass; "The Atonement Tango" by Stephen Leigh; "Prompt. Professional. Pop!" by Walter Jon Williams; "How to Move Spheres and Influence People" by Marko Kloos

=== Bantam Books (2023–present) ===
Wild Cards returned to its original publisher, Bantam Books, in 2023.

No.	Title	Original release
31	Pairing Up; Edited by Martin with assistance from Snodgrass	July 11, 2023; ISBN 978-0-593-35786-6
"Trudy of the Apes" by Kevin Andrew Murphy; "Cyrano d'Escargot" by Christopher Rowe; "In the Forests of the Night" by Marko Kloos; "The Wounded Heart" by Melinda M. Snodgrass; "Echoes From a Canyon Wall" by Bradley Denton; "The Long Goodbye" by Walton Simons; "What's Your Sign?" by Gwenda Bond and Peter Newman; "The Wolf and the Butterfly" by David Anthony Durham
32	Sleeper Straddle; Edited by Martin with assistance from Snodgrass	February 6, 2024; ISBN 978-0-593-35783-5
"Swimmer, Flier, Felon, Spy" by Christopher Rowe; "Days Go By" by Carrie Vaughn; "The Hit Parade" by Cherie Priest; "Yin-Yang Split" by William F. Wu; "Semiotics of the Strong Man" by Walter Jon Williams; "Party Like It's 1999" by Stephen Leigh; "The Bloody Eagle" by Mary Anne Mohanraj; "The Boy Who Would Be Croyd" by Max Gladstone
33	House Rules; Edited by Martin with assistance from Snodgrass	February 25, 2025; ISBN 978-0-593-35772-9
"Longing for Those Lost" by Stephen Leigh; "Promises Redux" by Stephen Leigh; "Lady Sri Extricates Herself, Emerging Not Entirely Unscathed" by Mary Anne Mohanraj; "Bah, Humbug, Murder" by Caroline Spector; "Two Lovedays" by Peter Newman; "The Nautilus Pattern" by Kevin Andrew Murphy; "Raw Deal" by Peadar Ó Guilín

=== Tor Books (2025) ===
Two years after the series returned to Bantam Books, Tor Books released a fourteenth book, Aces Full, which was a second collection of short stories that had first appeared on its website.

No.	Title	Original release
34	Aces Full; Edited by Martin with assistance from Snodgrass	November 11, 2025; ISBN 978-1250396891
Collects twelve stories that had been previously published only on Tor's website.: "The Button Man and the Murder Tree" by Cherie Priest; "The Thing About Growing Up in Jokertown" by Carrie Vaughn; "The Flight of Morpho Girl" by Caroline Spector & Bradley Denton; "Naked, Stoned, and Stabbed" by Bradley Denton; "The City That Never Sleeps" by Walton Simons; "Long is the Way" by Carrie Vaughn & Sage Walker; "Berlin Is Never Berlin" by Marko Kloos; "Hammer and Tongs and a Rusty Nail" by Ian Tregillis; "Ripple Effects" by Laura J. Mixon; "Skin Deep" by Alan Brennert; "Hearts of Stone" by Emma Newman; "Grow" by Carrie Vaughn

== Novellas ==
- "American Hero" -- an ebook novella edited Martin and published in March 2020 by Tor Books as a companion to the mosaic novel Inside Straight.

== Short stories ==
- "When We Were Heroes" by Daniel Abraham (January 16, 2013), edited by Martin
- "The Button Man and the Murder Tree" by Cherie Priest (May 15, 2013), edited by Martin
- "The Elephant in the Room" by Paul Cornell (May 29, 2013), edited by Martin
- "Lies My Mother Told Me" by Caroline Spector, published in Dangerous Women edited by Martin and published December 3, 2013.
- "Nuestra Señora de la Esperanza" by Carrie Vaughn (October 15, 2014), edited by Martin
- "Prompt. Professional. Pop!" by Walter Jon Williams (November 21, 2014), edited by Martin
- "Discards" by David D. Levine (March 30, 2016), edited by Patrick Nielsen Hayden
- "The Thing About Growing Up in Jokertown" by Carrie Vaughn (December 21, 2016), edited by Martin
- "The Atonement Tango" by Stephen Leigh (January 18, 2017), edited by Martin
- "When the Devil Drives" by Melinda Snodgrass (July 5, 2017), edited by Martin
- "Evernight" (February 21, 2018) by Victor Milán, edited by Martin
- "The Flight of Morpho Girl" (May 2, 2018) by Caroline Spector and Bradley Denton, edited by Martin
- "Fitting In" (October 24, 2018) by Max Gladstone, edited by Martin
- "How to Move Spheres and Influence People" (27 March, 2019) by Marko Kloos, edited by Martin
- "Long is the Way" (May 15, 2019) by Carrie Vaughn and Sage Walker, edited by Martin
- "The City That Never Sleeps" (August 28, 2019) by Walton Simons, edited by Martin
- "Naked, Stoned, and Stabbed" (October 16, 2019) by Bradley Denton, edited by Martin
- "The Visitor: Kill or Cure" by Mark Lawrence, edited by Martin
- "Berlin is Never Berlin" by Marko Kloos, edited by Martin
- "Hammer and Tongs and a Rusty Nail" by Ian Tregillis, edited by Martin
- "Ripple Effects" by Laura J. Mixon, edited by Martin
- "Skin Deep" by Alan Brennert, edited by Martin
- "Hearts of Stone" by Emma Newman, edited by Martin
- "Grow" by Carrie Vaughn, edited by Martin
- "I Have No Voice and I Must Zoom Meeting" by Paul Cornell

=== More information ===
Tor.com published 23 short stories Via its website from January 2013 to July 2022. With the exception of "Fitting In", "The Visitor: Kill or Cure" and "I Have No Voice and I Must Zoom Meeting", these were reprinted in the Wild Cards anthologies Full House and Aces Full.
