= Wild Cards =

Science fiction and superhero anthology series

- Wild Cards (1987) (first); Aces Full (2025) (most recent)
- Edited by: George R. R. Martin; Melinda M. Snodgrass
- Country: United States
- Language: English
- Genre: Superhero, Science fiction
- Publisher: Bantam Books (1987–1993, 2023–present); Baen Books (1993–1995); ibooks Inc. (2002–2006); Tor Books (2008–2022)
- Published: January 1987 – present
- Media type: Print (paperback and hardcover); Graphic novels; E-book; Audiobook
- No. of books: 34 (as of 2025)

Wild Cards is a series of science fiction superhero shared universe anthologies, mosaic novels, and solo novels. They are written by a collection of more than forty authors (referred to as the "Wild Cards Trust") and are edited by George R. R. Martin and Melinda M. Snodgrass. Set largely during an alternate history of post-World War II United States, the series follows humans who contracted the Wild Card virus, an alien virus that rewrites DNA and mutates survivors. Those who acquire crippling and/or repulsive physical conditions are known as Jokers, while those who acquire superhuman abilities are known as Aces, and those few who acquire minor, insignificant powers not worthy of being called aces are known as Deuces.

The series originated from a long-running campaign of the Superworld role-playing game, gamemastered by Martin and involving many of the original authors. The framework of the series was developed by Martin and Snodgrass, including the origin of the characters' superhuman abilities and the card-based terminology.

The first installment, Wild Cards, was released in January 1987 by Bantam Books and, as of February 2025, thirty-three books have been released through four publishers. The series has been adapted to comic books, graphic novels, and role-playing games.

== Premise ==
Set during an alternate history of post–World War II United States, the series follows events after an airborne alien virus is released over New York City in 1946 and eventually infects tens of thousands globally. The virus, designed to rewrite DNA, was developed as a bioweapon by a noble family on the planet Takis. It is taken to Earth to test on humans, who are genetically identical to the people of Takis. Dr. Tachyon, a member of this family, objects and attempts to stop them. However, his attempt crashes their ship, releasing the virus.

The virus affects each individual differently, and it becomes known as the Wild Card virus because of these "random and unpredictable" symptoms. It kills 90% of those who contract it and mutates the remaining percentage; 9% survive but become Jokers, who develop minor or crippling physical conditions. The remaining 1% become Aces, who remain human or mostly human in appearance but develop superhuman abilities; Aces whose abilities are too trivial or specific to be generally valuable are called Deuces.

== Origin ==
Wild Cards began as a two-year-long campaign of the Superworld role-playing game, gifted to George R. R. Martin by Victor Milán, in Albuquerque, New Mexico; the players were science fiction writers, including Gail Gerstner-Miller, Milán, John J. Miller, Melinda M. Snodgrass, and Walter Jon Williams, and Martin served as gamemaster. Because of the amount of time and creative energy put into the campaign, Martin initially thought to write a novel on his character, Turtle. However, he realized this would have "rescued one character from [the] SuperWorld campaign, but would have meant discarding all the rest". Since the game had been built by a group, he felt it should be a shared universe anthology, which were popular at the time. Martin invited other writers he believed would be interested in the universe, including Roger Zelazny, Lewis Shiner, Pat Cadigan, Howard Waldrop, Edward Bryant, and Stephen Leigh.

Martin said that the group loved comic books and superheroes but wanted to approach the material in a "grittier, more adult manner than what we were seeing in the '80s". He cited the series' "sense of history" as a strength and expressed frustration with the retroactive continuity of mainstream comics. Martin also felt that the multitude of sources for superpowers in comics strained suspension of disbelief when taken together, and he believed a single plausible source was needed. Snodgrass suggested a virus, which allowed for the superpowered Aces, the "monsters and freaks" Jokers, and a high death toll. Snodgrass and Martin also developed the card based terminology, and Milán developed the pseudoscience of the series.

The series was originally meant to be set in a then contemporary 1985, but Waldrop, who was to write the first story, insisted that his story take place right after World War II. This created a forty-year gap between the first chapter and the remaining stories, pushing later contributions to fill in the intervening decades. Martin noted that this forced the authors to write about events they would have otherwise ignored, particularly the House Un-American Activities Committee and the McCarthy hearings, which gave rise to characters and plot points that "added immeasurable richness to our world and depth of our characters". Waldrop's story also forced Williams to rewrite a new story, "Witness", which became the only shared world story to appear on the final ballot for a Nebula Award.

British writer Neil Gaiman met with Martin in 1987 and pitched a Wild Cards story about a character who lives in a world of dreams. Martin declined due to Gaiman's lack of prior credits at the time. Gaiman went on to publish his story as The Sandman.

== Publishing history ==
=== Bantam Books (1987–1993) ===
Bantam Books, under its Spectra imprint, published twelve books between 1987 and 1993, including two solo novels written by Melinda M. Snodgrass and Victor Milán.

- 1987 Wild Cards
- 1987 Aces High
- 1987 Jokers Wild
- 1988 Aces Abroad
- 1988 Down and Dirty
- 1990 Ace in the Hole
- 1990 Dead Man's Hand
- 1991 One-Eyed Jacks
- 1991 Jokertown Shuffle
- 1992 Double Solitaire (novel by Snodgrass)
- 1992 Dealer's Choice
- 1993 Turn of the Cards (novel by Milán)

=== Baen Books (1993–1995) ===
Baen Books published a new triad between 1993 and 1995 subtitled of a New Cycle. In 2002, Martin commented that he felt the triad was creatively "three of the strongest volumes Wild Cards ever had" and that the series "came back strong" after stumbling with a previous storyline; he conceded, however, that the triad was "very dark", acknowledging it was a commonly-voiced complaint, and that he felt switching publishers was a mistake.

- 1993 Card Sharks
- 1994 Marked Cards
- 1995 Black Trump

=== ibooks Inc. (2002–2006) ===
In 2000, ibooks Inc. purchased two new installments and the rights to reprint the first eight books of the series; the two new books were published between 2002 and 2006, including a solo novel by John J. Miller, and reprints for six of the first eight books were issued. The company filed for Chapter 7 bankruptcy in July 2005, shortly after the death of founder Byron Preiss. In December 2006, J. Bolyston & Co. Publishers, parent company of the Brick Tower Press imprint, acquired all of Preiss' assets, including those of ibooks, for $125,000. Brick Tower Press offered e-book versions of its titles, including Deuces Down and Death Draws Five via Humble Bundle in February 2016.

- 2002 Deuces Down
- 2006 Death Draws Five (novel by Miller)

=== Tor Books (2008–2022) ===
Tor Books, an imprint under Macmillan Publishers, published the series in both print and e-book format. It released thirteen new installments from November 2008 to August 2022. Tor Books also reprinted the first twelve, sixteenth & seventeenth novels as of November 2021.

- 2008 Inside Straight
- 2008 Busted Flush
- 2009 Suicide Kings
- 2011 Fort Freak
- 2014 Lowball
- 2016 High Stakes
- 2017 Mississippi Roll
- 2018 Low Chicago
- 2018 Texas Hold 'Em
- 2019 Knaves Over Queens
- 2021 Joker Moon
- 2022 Three Kings
- 2022 Full House
- 2025 Aces Full

Tor Books also published online supplementary material. A multi-author blog supporting Inside Straight opened in February 2008. The blog followed American Hero, the fictional reality television show in the book, and posted in-character "confessionals" from the twenty-eight characters competing on the show. That supplemental material was republished by Tor as an e-book titled American Hero: A Wild Cards Novel on March 3, 2020.

Twenty-three short stories were published through the Tor Books website from January 2013 through July 2022:

- 2013 "When We Were Heroes" by Daniel Abraham
- 2013 "The Button Man and the Murder Tree" by Cherie Priest
- 2013 "The Elephant in the Room" by Paul Cornell
- 2014 "Nuestra Señora de la Esperanza" by Carrie Vaughn
- 2014 "Prompt. Professional. Pop!" by Walter Jon Williams
- 2016 "Discards" by David D. Levine
- 2016 "The Thing About Growing Up in Jokertown" by Carrie Vaughn
- 2017 "The Atonement Tango" by Stephen Leigh
- 2017 "When the Devil Drives" by Melissa Snodgrass
- 2018 "EverNight" by Victor Milán
- 2018 "The Flight of Morpho Girl" by Caroline Spector and Bradley Denton
- 2018 "Fitting In" by Max Gladstone
- 2019 "How to Move Spheres and Influence People" by Marko Kloos
- 2019 "Long Is The Way" by Carrie Vaughn and Sage Walker
- 2019 "The City That Never Sleeps" by Walton Simons
- 2019 "Naked, Stoned, and Stabbed" by Bradley Denton
- 2020 "The Visitor: Kill or Cure" by Mark Lawrence
- 2020 "Berlin is Never Berlin" by Marko Kloos
- 2020 "Hammer and Tongs and a Rusty Nail" by Ian Tregillis
- 2021 "Ripple Effects" by Laura J. Mixon
- 2021 "Skin Deep" by Alan Brennert
- 2022 "Hearts of Stone" by Emma Newman
- 2022 "Grow" by Carrie Vaughn

A short story, titled "Lies My Mother Told Me" by Caroline Spector, was published in the Dangerous Women anthology, also edited by Martin. The anthology was released in December 2013.

All but two of the Tor Books website stories ("Fitting In" and "The Visitor: Kill or Cure"), plus "Lies My Mother Told Me," were collected in Full House and Aces Full.

An additional short story, titled "I Have No Voice and I Must Zoom Meeting" by Paul Cornell, was published on the official Wild Cards website in July 2020.

=== Bantam Books (2023–present) ===
The series returned to Bantam Books in July 2023.

- 2023 Pairing Up
- 2024 Sleeper Straddle
- 2025 House Rules

Bantam also began publishing original graphic novels featuring stories set within the Wild Cards universe.

- 2023 George R. R. Martin Presents Wild Cards: Now and Then: A Graphic Novel (Written by Carrie Vaughn with art by Renae De Liz)
- 2023 George R. R. Martin Presents Wild Cards: Sins of the Father: A Graphic Novel (Written by Melinda M. Snodgrass with art by Michael Komarck and Elizabeth Leggett)
- 2025 George R. R. Martin Presents Wild Cards: Ante Up: A Graphic Novel (Written by Kevin Andrew Murphy and John Jos. Miller with art by Jon Sanchez)

== Contributors ==
The collection of authors who have contributed to the Wild Card series is known as the Wild Cards Trust or the Wild Card consortium. As of House Rules , published in July 2025, forty-six authors have written for the series. Six authors have written for at least one novel released by each publisher of the series: Michael Cassutt, Stephen Leigh (often writing as S. L. Farrell), John J. Miller, Walton Simons, Kevin Andrew Murphy and Snodgrass. Every installment was edited by Martin, who has also contributed as an author to ten books; later installments were co-edited by Snodgrass.

Authors by publishing era
Author	Bantam Books (1987–1993)	Baen Books (1993–1995)	ibooks Inc. (2002–2006)	Tor Books (2008 – 2022)	Bantam Books (2023-)
Daniel Abraham			Deuces Down	Inside Straight, Suicide Kings, American Hero, Full House	
Saladin Ahmed				Low Chicago	
Gwenda Bond					Pairing Up
Edward Bryant	Wild Cards, Jokers Wild, Aces Abroad, Down and Dirty, Dealer's Choice				
Pat Cadigan	Aces High, Down and Dirty				
Michael Cassutt (Note: The 2010 Tor Books reprint of Wild Cards, originally published in 1987 by Bantam Books, added stories by Michael Cassut, David D. Levine, and Carrie Vaughn.)	Aces Abroad	Card Sharks	Deuces Down	Inside Straight, Lowball, American Hero, Joker Moon	
Chris Claremont	One-Eyed Jacks				
Paul Cornell				Fort Freak, Low Chicago, Knaves Over Queens, Full House	
Arthur Byron Cover	Down and Dirty				
Bradley Denton					Pairing Up
David Anthony Durham				Fort Freak, Lowball, High Stakes, Texas Hold 'Em	Pairing Up
Ty Franck				Fort Freak	
Gail Gerstner-Miller	Aces Abroad			American Hero	
Max Gladstone				Texas Hold 'Em	Sleeper Straddle
Leanne C. Harper	Wild Cards, Jokers Wild, Aces Abroad, Down and Dirty	Marked Cards			
Leo Kenden				Joker Moon	
Marko Kloos				Low Chicago, Knaves Over Queens, Full House	Pairing Up
Mark Lawrence				Knaves Over Queens	
Stephen Leigh (often as S. L. Farrell)	Wild Cards, Aces Abroad, Down and Dirty, Ace in the Hole, One-Eyed Jacks, Jokertown Shuffle, Dealer's Choice	Card Sharks, Marked Cards, Black Trump	Deuces Down	Inside Straight, Busted Flush, Suicide Kings, Fort Freak, High Stakes, Mississippi Roll, American Hero, Full House	Sleeper Straddle, House Rules
David D. Levine				Lowball, Mississippi Roll, Joker Moon, Full House	
George R. R. Martin (editor)	Wild Cards, Aces High, Jokers Wild, Aces Abroad, Down and Dirty, Dead Man's Hand, Dealer's Choice	Black Trump		Inside Straight, American Hero	
Victor Milán	Wild Cards, Aces High, Aces Abroad, Ace in the Hole, One-Eyed Jacks, Jokertown Shuffle, Turn of the Cards	Card Sharks, Marked Cards, Black Trump		Busted Flush, Suicide Kings, Fort Freak, Texas Hold 'Em, American Hero, Joker Moon, Full House	
John J. Miller	Wild Cards, Aces High, Jokers Wild, Aces Abroad, Down and Dirty, Dead Man's Hand, One-Eyed Jacks, Jokertown Shuffle, Dealer's Choice	Black Trump	Deuces Down, Death Draws Five	Inside Straight, Busted Flush, Fort Freak, High Stakes, Mississippi Roll, Low Chicago, American Hero, Joker Moon	
Laura J. Mixon		Card Sharks, Marked Cards		American Hero	
Mary Anne Mohanraj				Fort Freak, Lowball, Low Chicago, Joker Moon, Three Kings	Sleeper Straddle, House Rules
Kevin Andrew Murphy (Note: The 2015 Tor Books reprint of Aces Abroad, originally published in 1988 by Bantam Books, added stories by Kevin Andrew Murphy and Carrie Vaughn.) (Note: The 2018 Tor Books reprint of One-Eyed Jacks, originally published in 1991 by Bantam Books, added stories by Kevin Andrew Murphy and Carrie Vaughn.)		Card Sharks	Deuces Down	Busted Flush, Fort Freak, Mississippi Roll, Low Chicago, Knaves Over Queens, American Hero	Pairing Up, House Rules
Emma Newman				Knaves Over Queens	
Peter Newman				Knaves Over Queens, Three Kings	Pairing Up, House Rules
Peadar Ó Guilín				Knaves Over Queens, Three Kings	House Rules
Steve Perrin				American Hero, Joker Moon	
Cherie Priest				Fort Freak, Mississippi Roll	Sleeper Straddle
Christopher Rowe				Low Chicago, American Hero, Joker Moon	Pairing Up, Sleeper Straddle
Diana Rowland				Texas Hold 'Em	
Lewis Shiner	Wild Cards, Aces High, Jokers Wild, Aces Abroad, One-Eyed Jacks, Jokertown Shuffle				
Walton Simons	Aces High, Jokers Wild, Aces Abroad, Ace in the Hole, One-Eyed Jacks, Jokertown Shuffle	Marked Cards	Deuces Down	Busted Flush, Texas Hold 'Em, American Hero, Joker Moon	Pairing Up
Melinda M. Snodgrass (editor)	Wild Cards, Aces High, Jokers Wild, Aces Abroad, Down and Dirty, Ace in the Hole, One-Eyed Jacks, Jokertown Shuffle, Double Solitaire	Card Sharks, Marked Cards	Deuces Down	Inside Straight, Busted Flush, Suicide Kings, Fort Freak, Lowball, High Stakes, Low Chicago, Knaves Over Queens, American Hero, Joker Moon, Three Kings, Full House	Pairing Up
Caroline Spector				Inside Straight, Busted Flush, Suicide Kings, High Stakes, Knaves Over Queens, Texas Hold 'Em, American Hero, Joker Moon, Three Kings, Full House	House Rules
Charles Stross				Knaves Over Queens	
Ian Tregillis				Inside Straight, Busted Flush, Suicide Kings, Lowball, High Stakes, American Hero	
Carrie Vaughn				Inside Straight, Busted Flush, Lowball, Mississippi Roll, American Hero, Full House	Sleeper Straddle
Howard Waldrop	Wild Cards				
Sage Walker		Marked Cards, Black Trump		American Hero	
Royce Wideman				American Hero	
Walter Jon Williams	Wild Cards, Aces High, Down and Dirty, Ace in the Hole, Jokertown Shuffle, Dealer's Choice	Marked Cards		Lowball, American Hero, Full House	Sleeper Straddle
William F. Wu	One-Eyed Jacks	Card Sharks		Texas Hold 'Em, American Hero	Sleeper Straddle
Roger Zelazny	Wild Cards, Aces High, Down and Dirty	Card Sharks			

== In other media ==
=== Role-playing games ===
Wild Cards was adapted into a role-playing game format by Steve Jackson Games. Written by John J. Miller and published in June 1989, the sourcebook used GURPS Supers rules and contained descriptions of sixty of the characters. A supplement titled Aces Abroad, written by Kevin Andrew Murphy, was released in 1991. Green Ronin Publishing published Wild Cards Campaign Setting, written by Miller, for its Mutants & Masterminds RPG in August 2008; the game debuted at Gen Con that year. Two supplements were released: an adventure anthology titled All-in and a character book titled Aces & Jokers.

=== Comics ===
A four-issue Wild Cards limited series was released in 1990 by Epic Comics, an imprint of Marvel Comics. The issues were then collected and published as a trade paperback in October 1991. They were also included in Epic: An Anthology, released in 1992. A second limited series titled Wild Cards: The Hard Call, written by Daniel Abraham and illustrated by Eric Battle, was published over six issues from April to September 2008 by Dabel Brothers Productions. Dabel Brothers partnered with Del Rey to collect the titles in July 2008, including Wild Cards: The Hard Call, as graphic novels beginning in fall 2008. The issues were collected in a hardcover edition published by Dynamite Entertainment in February 2011.

Marvel Entertainment began publishing a 4-issue comic book limited series Wild Cards: The Drawing of Cards scripted by Paul Cornell in July 2022. The series adapted material from the first Wild Cards novel.

Bantam Books published two original Wild Cards graphic novels in 2023: George R. R. Martin Presents Wild Cards: Now & Then by writer Carrie Vaughn and artist Renae De Liz, and George R. R. Martin Presents Wild Cards: Sins of the Father by writer Melinda Snodgrass and artists Michael Komarck and Elizabeth Leggett.

=== Audiobooks ===
Unabridged audiobook versions of the first five books have been released. Audiobooks of the first two installments were released by Brilliance Audio in November and December 2011. Versions of the third, fourth, and fifth novels were released by Penguin Random House from February to March 2016, featuring voice talents for each character. The sixth and seventh installments were released in February and June 2017. Commencing in August 2018, HarperAudio (UK) began releasing a new set of audiobooks in the series. The first three (Mississippi Roll, Low Chicago and Texas Hold'em) were narrated by William Hope. Next, Peter Noble narrated the two UK Wild Cards works (Knaves Over Queens and Three Kings). The sixth audiobook from HarperAudio (UK) (which was released in August 2021), Joker Moon, was performed by Maya Saroya. On a side note, in the UK, Three Kings was released before Joker Moon, while the opposite happened in the US.

=== Film ===
In October 2011, Syfy Films, a joint venture between Syfy Channel and Universal Pictures, acquired screen rights to Wild Cards under the direction of Gregory Noveck, senior vice president of production. Snodgrass was asked to write the screenplay, and she and Martin were to serve as executive producers. At the time of announcement, the film was intended to have a contemporary setting and the Sleeper among its characters. This was the second time the series was optioned.

=== Television ===
In August 2016, Universal Cable Productions acquired the rights to create a television series. Martin stated that the development was in early stages and that the production was working on choosing characters and stories to adapt. Because of his exclusivity contract with HBO, which aired Game of Thrones based on Martin's A Song of Ice and Fire, Martin said he will not be involved in the adaptation. Snodgrass is to serve as an executive producer. In a blog post, Martin said that Noveck is also to serve as an executive producer.

Universal Cable Productions was teaming up with Hulu in November 2018 to develop two series based on the novels to establish a potential connected Wild Cards universe for the streaming service. However, as of 2021, the upcoming series had moved from Hulu to Peacock.
