= GURPS Wild Cards =

Scicen fiction role-playing game

- Cover art by Neal McPheeters
- Designers: John J. Miller
- Illustrators: Amanda Dee; Albert Deschesne; Glenn Johnson; Denis Loubet; Gary Thomas Washington; Charlie Wiedman; Neal McPheeters
- Publishers: Steve Jackson Games
- Publication: 1989
- Genres: Science fiction
- Systems: GURPS

GURPS Wild Cards is a sourcebook published by Steve Jackson Games (SJG) in 1989 for the superhero role-playing game GURPS Supers, and is based on the Wild Cards science fiction superhero shared universe anthologies.

== Contents ==
GURPS Wild Cards is a campaign setting for GURPS Supers, set in the alternate history world of the Wild Cards science-fiction series. After a short introduction, the book is divided into seven sections:

1. "History of the Wild Cards World" : The story of the Wild Cards alternate history, in which a virus of extraterrestrial origin spread in 1946, causing mutations that included superpowers.
2. "The Wild Cards Virus" : More information about the virus and its effects.
3. "Wild Cards Characters" : Descriptions and characteristics of heroes from the Wild Cards novels.
4. "On the Town: Description of New York City and New York society.
5. "Organizations": Several groups within the city, including gangs, cults, and organized crime.
6. "Aliens": descriptions of several extraterrestrial species.
7. "Wild Cards Gaming": How to adapt this to a GURPS Supers campaign.

The book concludes with a glossary and index.

== Publication history ==
In 1986, SJG published one of the first "universal" role-playing game systems, which could be adapted for use in any genre — science fiction, fantasy, superhero, etc. SJG then began to issue sourcebooks for new genres, as well as expansion books for the genre books. In 1989, SJG published the superhero genre book GURPS Supers. The same year, they negotiated a license to produce a role-playing campaign setting based on the science fiction superhero shared universe anthology series Wild Cards. The result was GURPS Wild Cards, published in 1989, a 128-page book written by John J. Miller, with cover art by Neal McPheeters, and interior art by Amanda Dee, Albert Deschesne, Glenn Johnson, Denis Loubet, Gary Thomas Washington, and Charlie Wiedman. It was one of the earliest licensed properties produced by Steve Jackson Games.

== Reception ==
In Issue 11 of the British magazine Games International, Mike Jarvis commented, "while being a fine product in most respects, this book is marred by the feeling of incompletion which pervades the book." Jarvis concluded by giving the book a rating of 3 out of 5.

In Issue 88 of Space Gamer/Fantasy Gamer, John Sullivan was generally positive, noting, "GURPS Wild Cards successfully addresses [the] ways to run a successful Supers campaign using the world of the Wild Cards. The world flavor is highly described and guidelines for adventures and play are given." However, "For those of you who have been waiting to play in this world, now you can." However, Sullivan pointed out that in order to use this book, the player would be required to buy two other SJG books, GURPS Basic and GURPS Supers. Sullivan thought players wanting to play the Wild Cards campaign would buy the other two books, but he cautioned those that merely wanted to use material from the book for a different role-playing game that the price for the three books probably was not worth it.

In Issue 45 of Abyss (Spring 1990), Dave Nalle, a fan of the Wild Cards series of anthologies, was generally impressed. However, he did point out "there could have been more exploration of the timeline and general background." Nalle concluded, "GURPS Wild Cards will definitely be a good buy not only for GURPS players, but for any gamer who wants to see that background broken down into its individual elements for campaign play."

In Issue 178 of Dragon (February 1992), Rick Swan was positive, writing that he could recommend it "to super-hero fans in general and GURPS Supers game enthusiasts in particular, this exceptional supplement discusses the world of the Takisian wild card virus in fascinating detail, addressing many of the questions left unanswered in the Bantam Spectra novel series, such as exactly how the virus triggers human mutations, the history of the Shadow Fist Society, and the mysterious link between the Wild Cards phenomena and baseball. Game statistics and background dossiers are given for the Great and Powerful Turtle, Sewer Jack, and dozens of other memorable characters, along with useful suggestions for creating player-designed mutants." However, Swan found "The section discussing actual role-playing is disappointingly skimpy. GMs are pretty much on their own when it comes to creating adventures, and the artwork is adequate at best." Swan concluded with a warning, saying, "this is a terrific effort. Be forewarned that, like the novels, this supplement is not intended for children."

Game designer Shannon Appelcline considered GURPS Wild Cards an "ironic property" since it was a GURPS book based on a novel series that was originally based on a role-playing game campaign that had been played using Superworld.

== Other reviews and commentary ==
- Games Review Vol. 2 #4.
