= Viable Paradise =

- Genre: Speculative fiction
- Begins: Autumn
- Ends: One week
- Frequency: Annual
- Locations: Martha's Vineyard, Massachusetts, U.S.
- Inaugurated: 1997; 29 years ago
- Website: viableparadise.com

Viable Paradise is an annual one-week residential writing workshop held each autumn on the island of Martha's Vineyard in Massachusetts and is focused on speculative fiction.

The workshop began in 1997, as part of a science fiction convention presented by the Martha's Vineyard Science Fiction Association. After 1998, the convention was discontinued, but the workshop continued.

Present and past instructors include: Patrick Nielsen Hayden, Teresa Nielsen Hayden, James D. Macdonald, Debra Doyle, Steven Gould, Laura J. Mixon, Lawrence Watt-Evans, Elizabeth Moon, Maureen McHugh, James Patrick Kelly, Elizabeth Bear, Cory Doctorow, John Scalzi, Sherwood Smith, Steven Brust, Daryl Gregory, Scott Lynch, Nisi Shawl, Fonda Lee, and C.L. Polk.

Past students include authors N. K. Jemisin, Marko Kloos, Fonda Lee, Sandra McDonald, Paul Melko, David Moles, Greg van Eekhout, Zin E. Rocklyn and Fran Wilde; and podcast editors and authors Serah Eley and Mur Lafferty.
