= Inferior =

Inferior may refer to:

- Inferiority complex
- An anatomical term of location
- Inferior angle of the scapula, in the human skeleton
- Inferior (book), by Angela Saini
- The Inferior, a 2007 novel by Peadar Ó Guilín
- Inferior good: economics term for goods that consumers buy less of as they become wealthier (vs "normal goods" where they buy more)
- Inferior planet, a planet orbiting inferior, within a particular orbit, such as of a planet

== See also ==
- Junior (disambiguation)
