= The Bone World Trilogy =

Book series

The Bone World Trilogy is a trilogy for young adults by Irish author Peadar Ó Guilín. The series has elements of science fiction and fantasy.

The first book in the trilogy, The Inferior, was published by David Fickling Books in 2007 (2008 in the U.S.A.), and the sequel, The Deserter, was published in September 2011.
