= World Without End =

World(s) Without End may refer to:

- "Unto the ages of ages", a biblical phrase sometimes translated as "world without end" in English books of prayer

== Film and television ==
- World Without End (film), a 1956 American science fiction film
- World Without End, a 1953 documentary film directed by Basil Wright and Paul Rotha
- World Without End (miniseries), a 2012 television adaptation of the Ken Follett novel (see below)
- "Worlds Without End", a 1985 two-part episode of G.I. Joe: A Real American Hero

== Literature and comics ==
- World Without End (comics), a 1990 DC Comics limited series written by Jamie Delano
- World Without End (Follett novel), a 2007 novel by Ken Follett, sequel to The Pillars of the Earth
- World Without End (Haldeman novel), a 1979 Star Trek novel by Joe Haldeman
- Worlds Without End (Shadowrun novel), a 1995 novel by Caroline Spector
- Le Monde sans fin (World Without End), a comic about climate change written by Jean-Marc Jancovici and illustrated by Christophe Blain

== Music ==
- World Without End (album), a 1988 album by the Mighty Lemon Drops
- World Without End, a 1994 album by De/Vision
- "World Without End", a song by Five Iron Frenzy from the 2000 album All the Hype That Money Can Buy
