= Scriptorium Fonts =

American typeface design company

Scriptorium fonts
- Company type: Sole proprietorship
- Industry: Type foundry
- Founded: 1992
- Defunct: 2021
- Headquarters: Austin, Texas, United States
- Key people: Dave Nalle (owner)
- Products: Fonts, Clip art
- Number of employees: 5 (2013)
- Website: www.fontcraft.com

Scriptorium Fonts was a type foundry based in Austin, Texas, founded in 1992 by game designer, editor and historian Dave Nalle. The type foundry had three other type designers, these included: Michael Scarpitti, Peter Nevins and Kevin Andrew Murphy.

In 2005, Scriptorium Fonts supported the fundraising efforts for Hurricane Katrina relief by selling three New Orleans-themed fonts (Guede, Ironworks and Veve) to three different Louisiana charities. Recently their fonts have been prominently featured in Spiderwick books and film.

The Windlass font was used on the covers of the Percy Jackson book series by Rick Riordan as well as the Percy Jackson and the Olympians film.

The Folkard font is used for the main heading font in World of Warcraft and also in the Disney Fairies game series.

The Valdemar font is featured on the covers of all of Mark Chadbourn's fantasy novel series including Age of Misrule.

As of 2023, the website is no longer available.
