= Kevin Andrew Murphy =

American writer and game designer

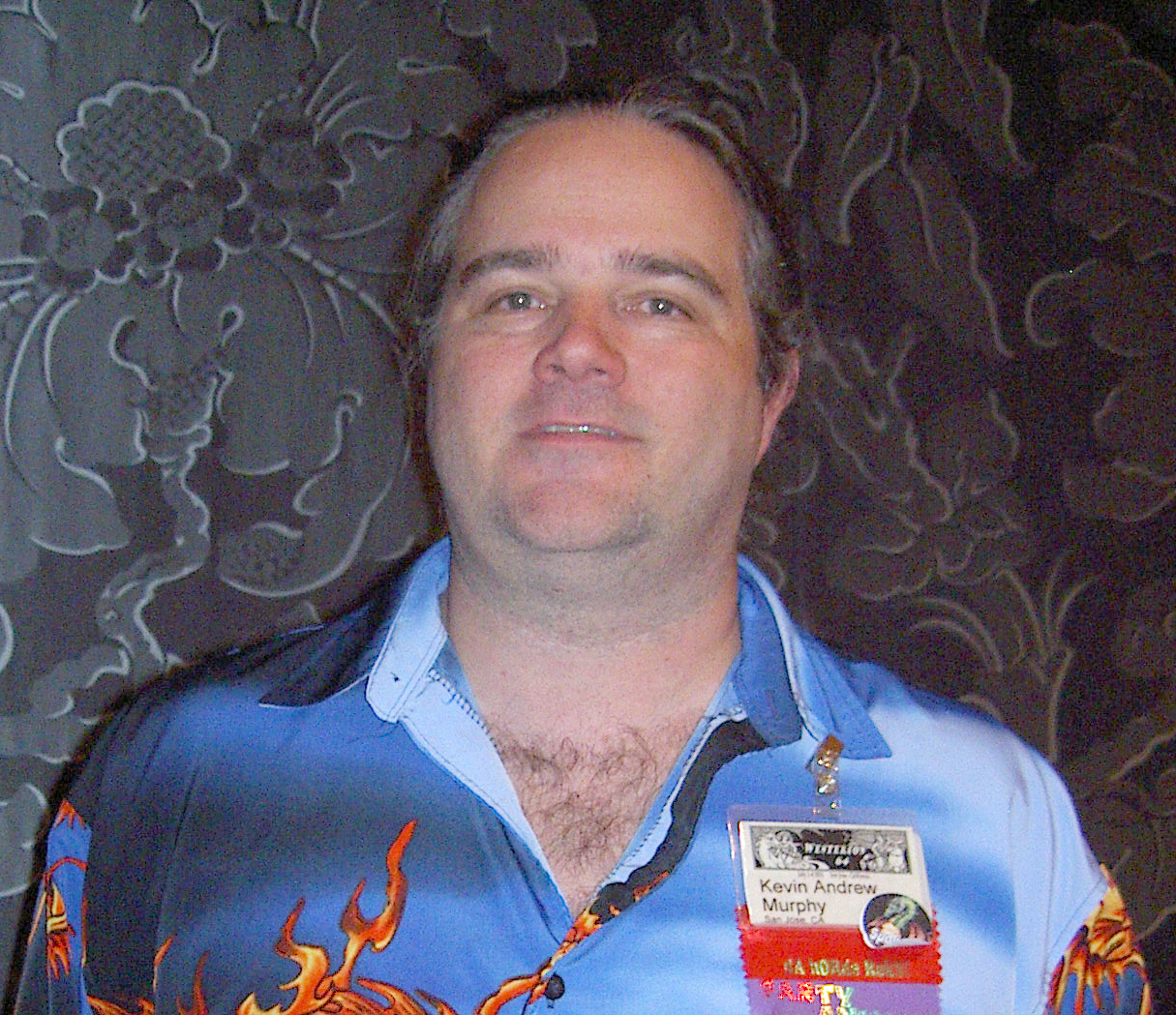
- Murphy at Westercon in 2011
- Occupation: American writer

Kevin Andrew Murphy is an American novelist and game writer from Northern California.

== Education ==
He is a graduate of University of California, Santa Cruz and has a Master of Arts from University of Southern California.

== Career ==
He has written gamebooks for Steve Jackson Games and White Wolf. He is one of the contributors to the Wild Cards book series edited by George R. R. Martin. His first solo novel, Penny Dreadful, was released in 2007. He is also the designer of several fonts on the theme of witchcraft for Scriptorium Fonts.

He wrote the essay "Unseen Horrors and Shadowy Manipulations" in the compilation Seven Seasons of Buffy: Science Fiction and Fantasy Writers Discuss Their Favorite Television Show. In a review in School Library Journal, Christine C. Menefee says his essay "documents instances of censorship and the attempts of network and advertisers to reshape Buffy to suit their purposes."

He completed the novel Drum into Silence (2002) posthumously for Jo Clayton.

His work has been published in the Shit Creek Review.

He has worked as a staff type designer for Scriptorium Fonts.

== Bibliography ==
=== Novels ===
- House of Secrets (w/ James A. Moore, 1995)
- Penny Dreadful (1996)
- Fathom Book 1: The World Below (2002)
- Drum Into Silence (w/ Jo Clayton, 2002)

==== Wild Cards universe ====
- "Cursum Perficio" (in Card Sharks, 1993)
- "With a Flourish and a Flair" (in Deuces Down, 2002)
- "The Tears of Nepthys" (in Busted Flush (2008))
- Mississippi Roll (w/ David D. Levine, Cherie Priest, Stephen Leigh, Carrie Vaughn, John J. Miller, 2017)
- Low Chicago (w/ Paul Cornell, Saladin Ahmed, Marko Kloos, John J. Miller, Mary Anne Mohanraj, Christopher Rowe, Melinda M. Snodgrass, 2018)
- A Flint Lies in the Mud and But a Flint Holds Fire (in Knaves Over Queens, 2018)

=== Short fiction ===
- "Masquerade" (1994)
- "The Mercury of the Wise" (1994)
- "Ties That Bind" (1994)
- "I'll Give You Three Wishes...." (1995)
- "A Cup of Honeysuckle" (1995)
- "Sealskin" (1995)
- "The Croquet Mallet Murders" (1995)
- "The Dark of the Year" (1995)
- "Headturner" (w/ Thomas S. Roche, 1995)
- "Silver Nutmeg, Golden Pear" (w/ James A. Moore, in Truth Until Paradox, 1995)
- "Grim Reminders" (w/ James A. Moore, in Truth Until Paradox, 1995)
- "Dead and Gone" (1996)
- "Stereopticon" (1997)
- "The Red Elixir" (1997)
- "The Nightwatch Is a Lonely Vigil" (1997)
- "Death for Death" (w/ Lillian Csernica, 1998)
- "Special Interests" (w/ Lillian Csernica, 1998)
- "The Five Petals of the Lotus" (1998)
- "Baubles, Bangles and Beads" (in Chicks 'n Chained Males, 1999)
- "Ferdinand Feghoot and the Zero-G Nunnery" (w/ Fred Flaxman, 2002))
- "Gingerbread Recipe Number 13" (in Hastur Pussycat, Kill Kill, 2004)
- "Tacos for Tezcatlipoca" (2009)
- "Frijoles for Fenris" (2009)
- "Tecate for Hecate" (2010)
- "The Restless Armadillo" (w/ Lillian Csernica, 2014)
- "Tea Smoke" (2017)

=== Gamebook (partial) ===
- Aces Abroad, a supplement for GURPS Wild Cards(1991).
- The Quintessential World of Darkness (1998)
- Guide to the Traditions (2001)

== Other sources ==
- "Author Profile: Kevin Andrew Murphy". Tangent: The Science Fiction & Fantasy Short Fiction Review Magazine. No. 15. Summer 1996. Archived from the original on 2007-09-30.
