= No-Frills Books =

1981 book series

No-Frills Books were a series of books published in 1981. The books in the series were titled after their genres, Western, Science Fiction, Romance, and Mystery. Each contained a list of "ingredients" on the front cover. For instance the ingredients for Mystery were "The Mystery volume is complete with everything: 'Detective, Telephone, Mysterious Woman, Corpses, Streets, Rain.'" The series was created by Terry Bisson of Jove Books who was inspired by the rise of generic brands at the supermarket. "I thought of it as a satire on publishing," Bisson told 99% Invisible in 2020, "if you could have no-frills cornflakes why couldn't you have no-frills romance?" The series contracted with authors who had written in their genres. These authors, none of whom are given credit by the books, were told to write no more than 18,000 words and to include every cliche of the genre possible in the book.

The books received positive reviews, including a review in The New York Times. The humorous review by an anonymous reviewer, who did so in tribute to the anonymous authors of the book series, concluded with "So, these books are excellent after all. But their covers will embarrass you on the subway. So buy a collection of William Cowper's poetry instead." A no-frills screenplay was developed but never produced.

Terry Bisson, quoted on the website Boing Boing, named the authors:

Mystery was written by Clark Dimond, a men's mag editor/writer who also wrote for comics. The Romance was written by Judy Coyne (former Glamour mag editor) née Wederholt. The SF was written by John Silbersack, SF editor and now an agent. The Western was by Vic Milan (SF author). We were working on a No-Frills Besteller [sic] (by me) and A No-Frills movie (by film critic David Ansen) when the series was dropped. My partner selling the series was Lou Rosetto who went on to found WIRED magazine."
