= In Darkness Waiting =

Short story by Stephen Leigh

In Darkness Waiting is a science fiction short story by Stephen Leigh. It was first published in 1977 in Isaac Asimov's Science Fiction magazine. The story was later expanded into a trilogy of novels, the so-called 'Neweden trilogy'.

== Plot ==
An unnamed highly trained killer has drifted from planet to planet, following the collapse of an empire. He eventually settles on a primitive and violent planet, and spends many years recruiting followers and apprentices to establish a Guild of Assassins, known as the Hoorka. Adopting the title of Thane, he sets up a rigid code that the Guild must follow. The Hoorka will accept paid contracts to kill, but the proposed subject is offered the chance to match the fee paid by the contractor and thus void the contract.

The Hoorka accept a contract by political figure, Li-Galant Vingi, to kill Gunnar, a rival political leader. The assassination team, led by Aldhelm, the 'Number Two' in the Hoorka hierarchy and possible successor to the Thane, fails. Gunnar has survived the chase until the dawn; the Code requires that he be given back his life if he has survived thus far.

Vingi is furious and demands that he and the Thane meet with Madame d'Embry, of the Alliance diplomatic resources team, who are trying to establish a new political unity. Vingi believes that the Hoorka have allied with Gunnar's party and d'Embry is unsure of the Hoorka's neutrality. The Thane hopes that she will allow the Hoorka to accept off-world contracts.

The Thane confronts Aldhelm, his protégé, over the future of the Hoorka; is Aldhelm the best choice for a successor?
