= Dangerous Women (anthology) =

Anthology edited by George R. R. Martin and Gardner Dozois

- First edition cover
- Editors: George R. R. Martin; Gardner Dozois
- Author: Various
- Original title: Femmes Fatale
- Language: English
- Genre: Science fiction/Fantasy
- Published: December 3, 2013
- Publisher: Tor Books
- Publication place: United States
- Media type: Print (hardcover)
- Pages: 784
- ISBN: 978-0-76533-206-6
- Preceded by: Warriors
- Followed by: Rogues

Dangerous Women is a cross-genre anthology featuring 21 original short stories and novellas "from some of the biggest authors in the science fiction/fantasy field", edited by George R. R. Martin and Gardner Dozois, and released on December 3, 2013. The works "showcase the supposedly weaker sex's capacity for magic, violence, and mayhem" and "explores the heights that brave women can reach and the depths that depraved ones can plumb." In his own introduction, Dozois writes: "Here you'll find no hapless victims who stand by whimpering in dread while the male hero fights the monster or clashes swords with the villain ... And if you want to tie these women to the railroad tracks, you'll find you have a real fight on your hands."

According to Dozois, Dangerous Women was conceived as a "cross-genre anthology, one that would mingle every kind of fiction, so we asked writers from every genre—science fiction, fantasy, mystery, historical, horror, paranormal romance, men and women alike—to tackle the theme." The anthology was originally announced as Femmes Fatale. Martin noted that the works by himself, Brandon Sanderson, Diana Gabaldon, and Caroline Spector are novellas. The anthology won the 2014 World Fantasy Award for Best Anthology.

== Contents ==
- Introduction by Gardner Dozois
- "Some Desperado" by Joe Abercrombie (The First Law)
  In the wild west, a desperate woman is chased by bounty hunters into a derelict town and still manages to come out on top of the situation. Nominated for a 2014 Locus Award.
- "My Heart is Either Broken" by Megan Abbott
  A husband suspects his eccentric wife of their daughter's murder, but the truth turns out to be worse.
- "Nora’s Song" by Cecelia Holland
  A story about princess Eleanor and her observations of the royal household of Henry II of England and (future) Richard I.
- "The Hands That Are Not There" by Melinda Snodgrass (Imperials)
  A lieutenant in a dystopian future hears about a conspiracy theory about an alien race capable of genetically altering humans.
- "Bombshells" by Jim Butcher (The Dresden Files)
  A young wizard's apprentice finds herself caught between warring factions and must race against time to save a vampire.
- "Raisa Stepanova" by Carrie Vaughn
  World War II Russian fighter pilot with an ambition to become an ace. The tale of the Russian resistance and her plight are interwoven with her own struggle for recognition.
- "Wrestling Jesus" by Joe R. Lansdale
  Two wrestlers become spellbound by a woman and continue to wrestle each other even after retirement on the unspoken condition that the winner gets to keep the woman.
- "Neighbors" by Megan Lindholm
  In a scenic suburb of Seattle, Alzheimer's disease changes the way of life for elderly women. A bit of magic and time travel are thrown in for good measure.
- "I Know How to Pick 'Em" by Lawrence Block
  A contemporary crime thriller; a femme fatale crime story with a twist.
- Shadows for Silence in the Forests of Hell by Brandon Sanderson (The Cosmere)
  In a forest inhabited by supernatural evil beings called shades, a middle-age inn-keeper turns bounty hunter at night.
- "A Queen in Exile" by Sharon Kay Penman
  Chronicles a little-known episode of late 12th-century Sicilian history; Constance of Sicily goes to great lengths to secure the support of the people for her son, (future) Frederick II, Holy Roman Emperor.
- "The Girl in the Mirror" by Lev Grossman (Magicians)
- "Second Arabesque, Very Slowly" by Nancy Kress
- "City Lazarus" by Diana Rowland
- Virgins by Diana Gabaldon (Outlander)
  In 1740 France, young Scottish Highlanders Jamie Fraser and Ian Murray become mercenaries.
- "Hell Hath No Fury" by Sherrilyn Kenyon, a present-day Native American ghost story
- "Pronouncing Doom" by S. M. Stirling (Emberverse), a "hanging judge" tale set "in a postapocalyptic America devastated by plague and machine failure"
- "Name the Beast" by Sam Sykes
- "Caretakers" by Pat Cadigan
- Lies My Mother Told Me by Caroline Spector (Wild Cards)
- The Princess and the Queen, or, the Blacks and the Greens by George R. R. Martin, a tale of "continent-burning warfare" that explodes between Targaryen Princess Rhaenyra and her stepmother Queen Alicent, set in the Westeros of Martin's A Song of Ice and Fire series, 200 years before the events of A Game of Thrones (1996). Nominated for a 2014 Locus Award.

== Reception ==
Both Abercrombie's "Some Desperado" and Martin's The Princess and the Queen were nominated for 2014 Locus Awards. The anthology as a whole won the 2014 World Fantasy Award for Best Anthology.
