= Battletech: Hearts of Chaos =

1996 novel by Victor Milán

Hearts of Chaos
- Author: Victor Milán
- Cover artist: David B. Mattingly
- Language: English
- Series: BattleTech
- Genre: Military science fiction
- Publisher: Roc Books
- Publication date: June 1996
- Pages: 416
- ISBN: 0-451-45523-1
- Preceded by: Close Quarters
- Followed by: Black Dragon

Hearts of Chaos is a novel by Victor Milán published by ROC in 1996.

== Plot summary ==
Hearts of Chaos is a BattleTech novel which features the return of Camacho's Caballeros, the mercenary team employed by Chandrasekar Kurita.

== Reception ==
Jim Swallow reviewed Hearts of Chaos for Arcane magazine, rating it an 8 out of 10 overall. Swallow comments that "Hearts of Chaos makes a good read and the battle sequences are swift and dynamic."
