= Laura J. Mixon =

American novelist

- Born: December 8, 1957 (age 68)
- Occupations: Writer; chemical engineer; environmental engineer
- Spouse: Steven Gould
- Writing career
- Genre: Science fiction
- Notable awards: Hugo Award for Best Fan Writer (2015)

Laura J. Mixon (born December 8, 1957) is an American science fiction writer and a chemical and environmental engineer. In 2011, she began publishing under the pen name Morgan J. Locke. Under that name, she was one of the writers for the group blog Eat Our Brains.

Mixon writes about the impact of technology and environmental changes on personal identity and social structures. Her work has been the focus of academic studies on the intersection of technology, feminism, and gender. She has also experimented with interactive storytelling, in collaboration with game designer Chris Crawford. She won the 2015 Hugo Award for Best Fan Writer for her reporting about the online activities of writer Benjanun Sriduangkaew.

== Biography ==
Mixon was born in December 1957 and went on to become a chemical and environmental engineer. In the 1980s, she took a break from that work to serve in the Peace Corps in East Africa. Her first book, Astropilots, was published as part of a young adult series by Scholastic/Omni books in 1987. Her second novel, Glass Houses, was originally serialized in Analog Magazine in 1991; it was published by Tor Books the following year. She wrote her next book, Proxies, set in the same universe as Glass Houses, but with a bigger scope. Burning the Ice continues the story begun in Proxies, but takes place long after the colony ship has left Earth.

Mixon is married to fellow science fiction writer Steven Gould, with whom she collaborated on the novel Greenwar. They live in Albuquerque, New Mexico, and have two daughters.

Mixon won the 2015 Hugo Award for Best Fan Writer for online commentary which "described the venomous behavior of a female, left-leaning troll". George R. R. Martin praised Mixon's "detailed, eloquent, and devastating expose of the venomous internet troll best known as 'Requires Hate' and 'Winterfox'," calling it "a terrific piece of journalism, an important piece that speaks to issues of growing importance to fandom in this internet age."

== Works ==
=== Novels ===
- Astropilots (USA: Omni Odysseys/Scholastic pb, Jun 1987; UK: Dragon Books pb, 1987; Japan: Hayakawa Books pb, 1989)
- Glass Houses (Analog Magazine, Dec 1991; Tor Books pb, May 1992)
- Greenwar, in collaboration with Steven Gould (Forge Books hc, Jun 1997; Tor Books pb, Nov 1998)
- Proxies (Tor Books hc, Sep 1998; pb Oct 1999)
- Burning the Ice (Tor Books hc, Aug 2002)
- Up Against It (Tor Books hc, Mar 2011) as Morgan J. Locke

=== Novellas ===
- “A Dose of Reality”, with Melinda M. Snodgrass (Wild Cards XIV, Baen Books pb; Mar 1994)

=== Novelettes ===
- “The Lamia's Tale” (Wild Cards XIII, Baen Books pb; Mar 1993)
- “At Tide’s Turning” (Asimov's, April 2001; Worldmakers, St. Martin's Press, Dec 2001)

=== Short stories ===
- “True North,” as Morgan J. Locke (Welcome to the Greenhouse, edited by Gordon van Gelder, O/R Press Feb 2011)
- "Ripple Effects", edited by George R. R. Martin, as part of the Wild Cards series, Tor Books (online), May 19, 2021

=== Nonfiction ===
- “A Pilgrim's Progress: My Experiments with a New Interactive Storytelling Technology” (The SFWA Bulletin, May 1997)
- “Writing on the Edges: The Science in Science Fiction” (The SFWA Bulletin, Jun 1999)
- ""A Report on Damage Done by One Individual Under Several Names," at Mixon's LiveJournal
