= Jo Clayton =

American fantasy and science fiction writer (1939–1998)

- Jo Clayton c. 1997
- Born: Patricia Josephine Clayton; February 15, 1939; Modesto, California, US
- Died: February 13, 1998 (aged 58)
- Occupation: Writer
- Writing career
- Period: 1977–1998
- Genres: Science fiction, fantasy

Jo Clayton (February 15, 1939 – February 13, 1998) was an American fantasy and science fiction author. She wrote 35 novels and many short stories. Her works sold over one and a quarter million copies.

== Biography ==
She was born Patricia Jo Clayton in Modesto, California, and was raised in the area along with two sisters by her farmsteading parents. Their parents arranged for all three children to attend college, and Jo graduated summa cum laude from the University of Southern California in 1963. She worked as a teacher for thirteen years, beginning in Bell, California.

In 1969 she had a religious conversion and moved to New Orleans to join the Sisters of Mount Carmel, a Roman Catholic order of instructors. She left the order after three years, just before she would have taken her vows to become a nun. While in New Orleans she wrote heavily and also worked as an artist, painting people's pets. By 1983 she decided to move to Portland, Oregon.

At age 57 she was diagnosed with multiple myeloma, a cancer of the bone marrow, and died from her condition a year and a half later. During her stay in the hospital she continued writing, completing a full novel and half of the last book in a trilogy.

She was survived by her mother, Bessie Clayton, and her sisters, Penn Brumm and Pamela Larsen.

== Bibliography ==
=== Diadem universe ===
The Diadem Saga

1. Diadem from the Stars (1977)
2. Lamarchos (1978)
3. Irsud (1978)
4. Maeve (1979)
5. Star Hunters (1980)
6. The Nowhere Hunt (1981)
7. Ghosthunt (1983)
8. The Snares of Ibex (1984)
9. Quester's Endgame (1986)

Shadith's Quest

1. Shadowplay (1990)
2. Shadowspeer (1990)
3. Shadowkill (1991)

The Shadowsong Trilogy

1. Fire in the Sky (1995)
2. The Burning Ground (1995)
3. Crystal Heat (1996)

Standalones

- A Bait of Dreams (1985)
- Shadow of the Warmaster (1988)

=== The Skeen Trilogy ===
1. Skeen's Leap (1986)
2. Skeen's Return (1987)
3. Skeen's Search (1987)

=== Duel of Sorcery universe ===
The Duel of Sorcery Series

1. Moongather (1982)
2. Moonscatter (1983)
3. Changer's Moon (1985)

The Dancers Trilogy

1. Dancer's Rise (1993)
2. Serpent Waltz (1994)
3. Dance Down the Stars (1994)

=== Drinker of Souls universe ===
The Soul Drinker Trilogy

1. Drinker of Souls (1986)
2. Blue Magic (1988)
3. A Gathering of Stones (1989)

The Wild Magic Series

1. Wild Magic (1991)
2. Wildfire (1992)
3. The Magic Wars (1993)

=== The Drums of Chaos ===
1. Drum Warning (1996)
2. Drum Calls (1997)
3. Drum into Silence (2002), completed posthumously by Kevin Andrew Murphy

=== Short fiction ===
- "A Bait of Dreams" (1979)
- "A Thirst for Broken Water" (1979)
- "Southwind My Mother" (1980)
- "Companioning" (1980)
- "Nightwork" (1982)
- "Currents" (1985)
- "Interlude Among the Shaborn" (1985)
- "Jezeri and Her Beast Go to the Fair and Find More Excitement Than They Want" (1985)
- "Old Acquaintances and New" (1985)
- "Team Venture" (1985)
- "Change" (1990)
- "Arakney's Web" (1993)
- "Maggot's Feast" (1994)
- "Bloodsong" (1995)
- "Dinner Music" (1995)
- "Hallah's Choice" (1995)
- "The Prism of Memory" (1995)
- "In a Yellow Dress" (1995)
- "The Hero Trap" (1995)
- "The Man Who Loved the River" (1995)
- "Peeling the Heart" (1995)
- "The Ninth Expiation" (1995)
- "Potholes in the Road to Hell" (1995)
- "Fox Maid's Travail" (1996)
- "Patience" (1996)
- "Water Patterns" (1996)
- "Pavanne for a Dead Pross" (1996)
- "The Bone's Captive Bride" (1997)
- "Ghost Rot" (1997)
- "Borrowed Light" (1997)
- "The Hour of the Sisters" (1998)
- "Traps" (1998)
- "Prices" (2000)

== Sources ==
- "Additional Statements: Jo Clayton, Author", Senator Tom Harkin, February 27, 1998, Congressional Record, p. S1164.
