= The Hacker Files =

DC comic book mini-series

- Cover to Hacker Files No. 2, artist Tom Sutton.

Publication information
- Publisher: DC Comics
- Schedule: monthly
- Format: mini-series
- Publication date: August 1992 – July 1993
- No. of issues: 12
- Main characters: Jack Marshall; Barbara Gordon; Sarge Steel

Creative team as of August 1992
- Created by: Lewis Shiner, Tom Sutton
- Written by: Lewis Shiner
- Penciller: Tom Sutton
- Inker: Mark Buckingham

The Hacker Files is a twelve issue DC Comics mini-series published from August 1992 to July 1993. It was written by Lewis Shiner and illustrated by Tom Sutton.

== Publication history ==
The series, written by cyberpunk novelist Lewis Shiner, is notable for the appearance of a post-Suicide Squad member Barbara Gordon (Oracle), as well as the introduction of the Digitronix computer company, a fictitious computer brand which would continue to show up in the DCU for years thereafter.

At the end of issue 1 in the 'letters pages' section, author Lewis Shiner reveals that he based The Hacker Files story and comic book protagonist Jack Marshall on his unpublished novel Red Weather, which he began developing in Summer 1978. That story dealt with a software programmer in his late-twenties named "Jack Marshall", who worked for a sinister Texas-based computer company. This in itself was inspired by Shiner's employment with Warrex Computer Corp. in the ’70s who produced the Centurion family of minicomputers.

== Story ==
Jack Marshall (Hacker) is a freelance systems analyst from Raleigh, North Carolina. Fascinated with computers ever since he was a child, he grew up alongside the industry and eventually ended up working at Digitronix World Industries (DTX), a small company in Dallas, Texas. Maverick company president Donny Travis worked alongside Marshall to invent the Digitronix Desktop PC.

The Digitronix PC's success and profits caused rapid growth in the company, and a new senior Vice President named Walter Sutcliffe denied Marshall any profit sharing from his invention, because said profit sharing was based on a handshake agreement between Marshall and Donny Travis. Sutcliffe was one of five middle managers Donny Travis brought in from CompuTech. According to Jack, CompuTech went under due to incompetent middle management. Marshall attempted to steal his own codebase for a new updated version of Digitronix' proprietary operating system DROS (Digitronix Resident Operating System) but was caught and summarily terminated. But since he is the only one who truly understands DROS, he is brought in by the United States government (specifically Sarge Steel) as a freelance troubleshooter whenever there is a problem.

=== "SoftWar" ===
The first Story arc SoftWar dealt with a virus infecting the Digitronix computers used by the Pentagon, it had somehow spread over the internet and infected Arpanet (Advanced Research Projects Agency), Securenet (connects to bombers and missiles) and Milnet. Jack compiles an anti-virus and recounts his history with Digitronix after a confrontation with Sutcliffe. He is able to cure the virus everywhere except Cheyenne Mountain Complex which isolated itself the moment a virus was detected. The virus takes over the Cheyenne Mountain system and uses it to begin deploying ICBMs. Jack uncovers a traitor in Cheyenne Mountain who dies while trying to escape, he later stops General Wade Eiling from accidentally launching a nuclear strike on Russia and prevents World War III.

=== "Operation Moonwitch" ===
The Operation Moonwitch storyline was based on real world Operation Sundevil, a United States Secret Service crackdown on illegal computer hacking activities that took place in 1990. The operation is named after a decoy message board used by the Federal Government called Moon Witch. Someone got hold of the E911 document which details how the national emergency response system works, and then they put the document online in a real world zine named Phrack. The government uses the theft and publication of the document as an excuse to dismantle the Hacker subculture. They arrest Sue Denim of the Speed Metal Kids after copies of the document are planted on their personal computers, and Oracle (Barbara Gordon) who downloaded a copy from Phrack as part of an investigation. Barbara accidentally shoots a Federal agent who had burst into her bedroom, but his vest saves him, in federal prison she uses the alias Amy Beddoes from her days with the Suicide Squad. Jack Marshall finds a copy on his own machine and deletes it, he is able to trace that copy back to Digitronix World Industries. Catherine Cobert of Justice League International calls in the assistance of Green Lantern Hal Jordan on behalf of Sue Denim and Oracle, but Jack Marshall gets there first. Oracle is able to prove that the file originated at Digitronix and all the detainees are set free.

Jack Marshall, art by Tom Sutton.

=== "Working-Class Hero" ===
Jack confronts his former co-worker Yoshio Natsume. Yoshio is the nephew of Tohiro Natsume whose Japanese company originally supplied Digitronix with cheap computer chips he bought on the Black Market from the Yakuza, but he later built chip foundries in mainland China. Jack confronts Yoshio with evidence of his complicity in the Pentagon Virus and the E911 document leak. Jack discovers that Yoshio was framed by Sutcliffe who has been using his superuser account and password. Yoshio introduces Jack to Yan Qing a Chinese exile and a survivor of the Tiananmen Square protests of 1989, her fiance Yi who worked at a Digitronix assembly plant in China, had discovered an undocumented feature in the machine he was working on, it automatically recorded all spoken conversation in its local environment and stored it in a hidden partition on the machine's optical hard drive. He disappeared soon after sharing this fact with a close friend from the plant. Jack schedules a meeting with his ex-wife Kathy Spencer who works in Digitronix' hardware division, and who designed the security hardware that protects all Digitronix plants. Kathy gives Jack a device which should get him past a plant's electronic security. Jack goes to China intending to break into one of the assembly plants, but his arrival is anticipated by Sutcliffe. Due to a botched infiltration Jack and Yoshio and captured by Sutcliffe and thrown into a holding cell with Yi. While in that cell they begin to see the outlines of the Aleph conspiracy, the true reason for the virus, and how the information retrieved from the computers would be routed by the virus and co-ordinated by Tohiro Natsume's newest project a supercomputer with 64 parallel processors. They escape from the cell using Kathy's anti-security device, and sneak Yi out of China by shipping him to the US in an equipment box.

=== "Showdown" ===
Yoshio discovers a massive mobilization of Digitronix personnel and hardware being sent to a secret facility at Tyuratam in Kazakhstan, parallel processors, Prolog language modules, and experimental fiber optic buses. They figure out that Digitronix is building a working globally networked artificial intelligence which they intend to use to process a few million gigabytes of stolen government and industrial secrets. Jack uses a Digitronix videophone to contact Justice League Europe headquarters in London, and offers them a cure for the Pentagon virus. When he gets there he tells Hal Jordan and the rest of the JLE what Digitronix is really up to. Wally West scouts the installation at superspeed and runs into a door knocking himself out, he is captured by Digitronix security but escapes them when he wakes up. Jack uses the virtual reality interface to hack the AI which looks like Sutcliffe, he confronts it inside a game of Code of the West. Jack had designed a compact videogame for the DTX PC called Code of the West, it is also a backdoor which is hardcoded into the operating system of every Digitronix PC. Jack uses this game to define the rules of the fight between himself and the AI. The AI makes sure there is no possible way for it to lose the game. Jack deliberately loses to the AI, allowing it to kill him in the game, because "There's a million ways to END the game by losing...but NONE to end it by WINNING. And since you CAN'T lose...you're going to be here a LONG time". He leaves the AI playing the game, stuck in a recursive loop. Yoshio is put in charge of Digitronix, and no charges are filed against the company.

== Speed Metal Kids ==
The Speed Metal Kids are teenage hackers who worship internet personalities like Hacker and Oracle, and who serve as his assistants:

- Sue Denim – fifteen-year-old heavy metal fan.
- Phreaky Phreddy – as in phone phreaking.
- Master Blaster – a thirteen-year-old African-American video game buff.

== Digitronix PC ==
The Digitronix PC (DTX PC) of 1992 is an inexpensive OEM personal computer that can also serve as a business capable workstation or a clustered file server. It boasted 100 megabytes of ram, an HDTV monitor and optical disk storage, possibly based on the NeXTcube's magneto-optical drive. It also had built in compatibility with NTSC\PAL formats and had built in composite video out, as well as advanced digital audio and video editing capacity on-chip, possibly as coprocessors similar to the Amiga.

== DROS ==
DROS is the Digitronix Resident Operating System, a free copy of DROS was bundled with every machine. Lewis Shiner gives detailed information on the inner workings of DROS in the usr/hacker/mail section at the back of the first two issues. Because series consultant Alan Wexelblat had warned him that UNIX was not considered secure enough for government installation (in 1992), he decided that DROS would look like UNIX but would not exactly be UNIX. Kim Fairchild, another series consultant, suggested that he use emacs as DROS' resident text editor. In DROS file blocks are graphically represented as rows of stacked rectangular blocks. All commands shown when Jack interacts with DROS are Unix commands. As in UNIX, BSD and Linux, there are user and superuser accounts.

=== Command line examples ===
/dev/sd0a
pent1.dod.com:/usr/share
rm vcom.doc

== Notes ==
- In issue No. 11 of the series Digitronix technicians in Kazakhstan demonstrate an early prototype virtual reality computer interface that may be the same one later used by Barbara Gordon (Oracle).
- The letters printed in issues #3–12 were taken from online letter columns that Shiner setup on GEnie and CompuServe bulletin boards. Some of the letters were from computer industry professionals and enthusiasts who often corrected technical errors they had found in previous issues.
- The cover to issue No. 8 shows a DTX (Digitronix) SCSI optical storage disk (possibly a hybrid magneto-optical/DVD RAM drive), with a 40 megabyte to 2 gigabyte storage capacity and a DTX mainboard. The optical storage disk is labeled as "Macintosh, NeXT, DOS and Novell compatible".
- According to the book's Who's Who entry, Digitronix computers are supposedly used by both Batman and Oracle.
