= John J. Miller (author) =

American novelist (1954–2022)

- Born: John Joseph Miller; March 28, 1954; New York, U.S.
- Died: January 5, 2022 (aged 67); Albuquerque, New Mexico, U.S.
- Occupation: Author
- Writing career
- Genre: Science fiction
- Notable work: GURPS Wild Cards (1989)

John Joseph Miller (also known as J.J. Miller, John J. Miller, and John Jos Miller) was born on March 28, 1954, in New York state, and died January 5, 2022, at his home in Albuquerque, New Mexico.

Miller was a science fiction author known for his work in the long-running (since 1987) Wild Cards shared universe series of original anthologies and novels, edited by George R. R. Martin. He published nine novels, thirty-one short stories and eight comic book stories. He also wrote GURPS Wild Cards, a supplement for the GURPS role-playing system published in 1989, and two Wild Cards world books and histories published by Green Ronin.

Miller was a Fellow of the Society for American Baseball Research (SABR) and an authority on America's Negro league baseball of the 20th century. He was also a longtime fan of the New York Mets baseball team.
