= Caroline Spector =

American novelist

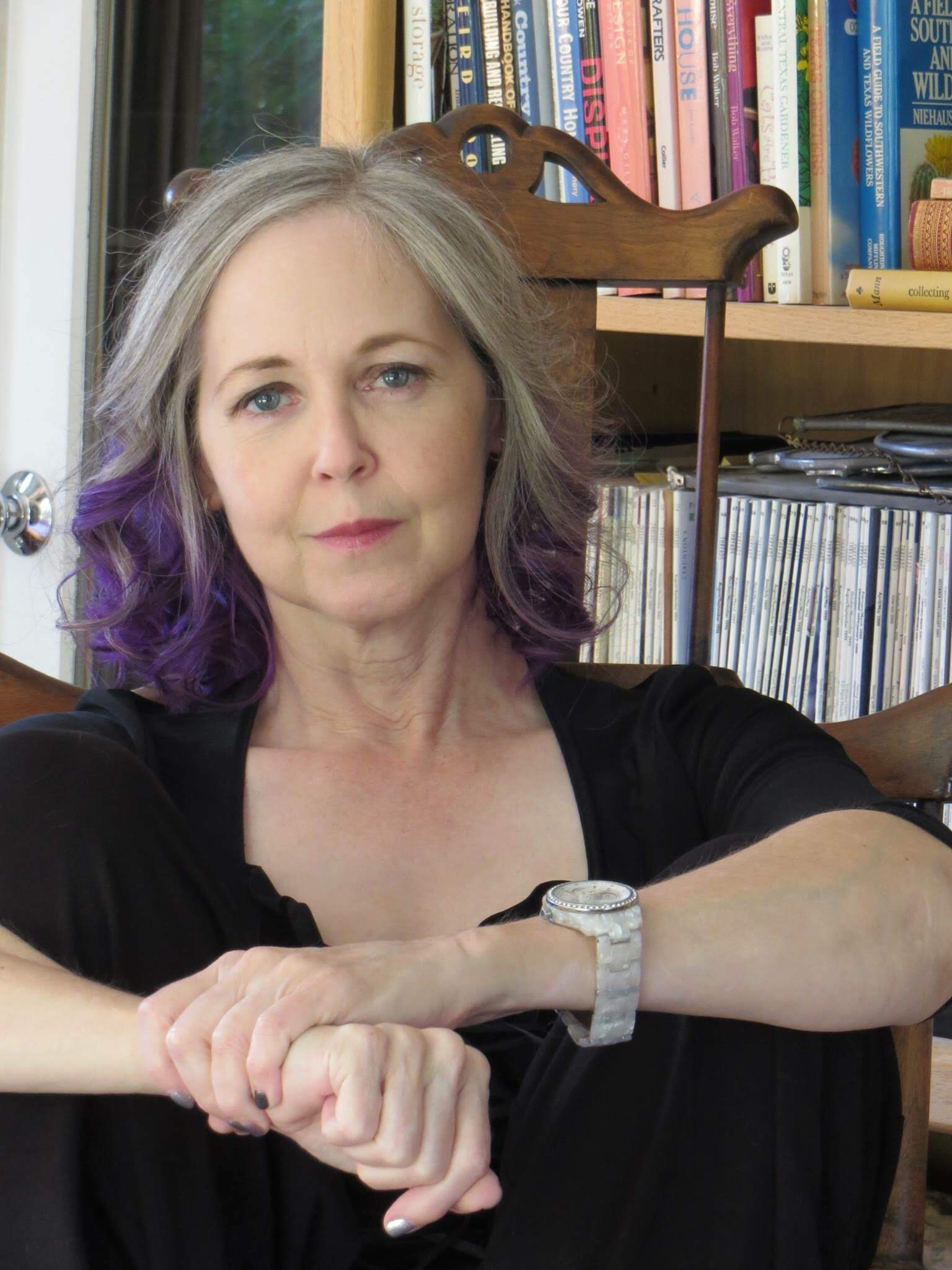
- Born: Caroline Skelley; April 27, 1958 (age 68); Lockbourne, Ohio, United States
- Occupation: Writer
- Years active: 1990–present
- Spouse: Warren Spector (m. 1987)

Caroline Spector (born Caroline Skelley) is a science fiction and fantasy writer who has also written role-playing game modules and computer game hint books. She also spent two years as associate editor at Amazing Stories magazine. She is a member of George R. R. Martin's Wild Cards consortium, the group of contributing authors to the ongoing Wild Cards shared world original story anthology series edited by Martin, now in its 22nd volume, and currently published by Tor Books.

== Personal life ==
Caroline Skelley met writer Warren Spector in 1984 at a comic book store in Austin, Texas, where she was employed. They were married on April 11, 1987. The couple have at times worked together on game supplements for the Marvel Super Heroes role-playing game.

== Works ==
=== Gaming ===
- Ultima: The Avatar Adventures (Secrets of the Games series) with Rusel DeMaria (May 18, 1992) Prima Games, ISBN 1-55958-130-1
- Ultima VII and Underworld: More Avatar Adventures (Secrets of the Games series) (June 1, 1993) Prima Games, ISBN 1-55958-251-0
- Might and Magic Compendium: The Authorized Strategy Guide to Games I-V (Secrets of the Games series) (January 10, 1994) Prima Games, ISBN 1-55958-325-8
- Reap the Whirlwind (Marvel Super Heroes Module MX3) with Warren Spector (September 1987) Wizards of the Coast, ISBN 0-88038-481-6
- The Revenge of Kang (Marvel Super Heroes module MT3) with Ray Winninger (January 1990) Wizards of the Coast, ISBN 0-88038-777-7
- Top Secret/S.I.: The Web (June 1990) Wizards of the Coast, ISBN 0-88038-820-X

=== Novels ===
- Worlds Without End (Shadowrun #18) (September 1, 1995) Roc Books, ISBN 0-451-45371-9
- Little Treasures (Earthdawn, second book in the Immortals Trilogy; no English-language publication.) First edition, in German, Kleine Schätze (1995) Heyne, ISBN 3-453-08542-6
- Scars: A Lost Novel of Earthdawn (December 30, 2005) Per Aspera Press, ISBN 0-9745734-2-6

=== Short stories ===
- "His Cool, Blue Skin", Dragons Over England (May 1992) West End Games, ISBN 0-87431-342-2
- "Metagames", Wild Cards: Inside Straight (January 22, 2008) Tor Books, ISBN 0-7653-1781-8
- "Coulda, Woulda, Shoulda", Wild Cards: Busted Flush (December 9, 2008) Tor, ISBN 0-7653-1782-6
- (Amazing Bubbles adventure), Wild Cards: Suicide Kings (December 22, 2009) Tor, ISBN 0-7653-1783-4
- "Lies My Mother Told Me", Dangerous Women (December 3, 2013) Tor, ISBN 0-7653-3206-X
- (Amazing Bubbles adventure), Wild Cards: High Stakes (July 10, 2016) Tor, ISBN 0-7653-3562-X
- "The Flight of Morpho Girl" with Bradley Denton, edited by Martin
- "Needles and Pins" Wild Cards: Knaves Over Queens (June 18, 2018), ISBN 0-0082-8359-1
- "Bubbles And The Band Trip" Wild Cards: Texas Hold'em (November 6, 2018) ISBN 0-7653-9059-0

=== Essays ===
- "Power and Feminism in Westeros", Beyond the Wall: Exploring George R. R. Martin's A Song of Ice and Fire, From A "Game of Thrones" to "A Dance with Dragons" (June 26, 2012) BenBella Books, ISBN 1-936661-74-8
