= Mary Anne Mohanraj =

American writer (born 1971)

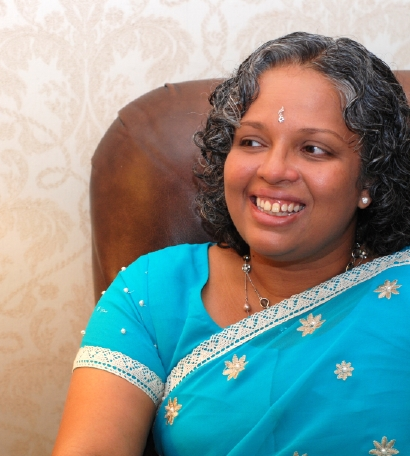
- Born: July 26, 1971 (age 55); Colombo, Ceylon
- Education: University of Chicago (BA); Mills College (MFA), University of Utah (PhD)
- Occupations: Writer; editor; academic

Mary Anne Amirthi Mohanraj (born July 26, 1971) is an American writer, editor, and academic of Sri Lankan birth.

== Background ==
Mohanraj was born in Colombo, Sri Lanka, but moved to the United States at the age of two and grew up in New Britain, Connecticut.

Her parents, who had originally intended to return to Sri Lanka after a few years and were still considering the possibility for the future, planned in 1983 to send 12-year-old Mary Anne to live with her grandparents for a summer "to reconnect" with her homeland. Just before she was to go, her father received a telegram. "Don't send her. There's trouble coming." He cancelled the trip. As she later wrote,

It's called Black July in Sri Lanka. Riots erupted in Colombo, the capital city, killing thousands of Tamils, the ethnic minority group, the group to which I belong. Brutal chaos ensued – friends of mine who were there tell horrifying stories. They saw tires put around men's necks, saw them lit on fire. They saw women and children dragged from their homes, pulled from cars to be raped and killed in the street.

I saw none of this, but the stories haunt my fiction. Whether I'm writing mainstream lit or fantasy or science fiction, I keep coming back to the war in Sri Lanka. I keep thinking about the life I would have had, if my parents had made different choices. If we had stayed there, and been killed in the riots. If I had gotten on that plane. If we had fled, as so many of my aunts and uncles did, and ended up as refugees in Canada or elsewhere.

Instead, Mohanraj attended Miss Porter's School and the University of Chicago and graduated with a degree in English Literature in 1993. She holds an MFA from Mills College (1998) and a PhD in English Literature from the University of Utah (2005). She also attended the Clarion West Writing Workshop in 1997.

== Academic career ==
Mohanraj has taught at Salt Lake Community College, the University of Utah, and Vermont College. From September 2005 to June 2007, she was a visiting professor in the MFA Program at Roosevelt University. From 2007 to 2008, she was a visiting professor at Northwestern University, in the Center for the Writing Arts. She taught at the Clarion Workshop in July 2008. Since 2008, she has worked as in the English Department at the University of Illinois at Chicago (UIC), first as Clinical Assistant Professor, and currently as Clinical Associate Professor. She was Associate Coordinator of Asian and Asian American Studies at UIC from 2009 to 2014.

== Writing ==
Her novel-in-stories, Bodies in Motion, received an honorable mention from the 2007 Asian American Literary Awards and was named a USA Today notable book. In 2006, Mohanraj received an Illinois Arts Council Fellowship in Prose. She was the co-founder and editor-in-chief for Clean Sheets, an online magazine of erotica, from 1998 to 2000. In 2000 she helped found Strange Horizons, where she was the editor-in-chief through 2003. In 2004 she founded the Speculative Literature Foundation, which she still directs, and is a founding member and Executive Director of Desilit, an organization designed to support South Asian and diaspora writers. Mohanraj founded and is Executive Director of the biennial Kriti Festival, a celebration of South Asian and diaspora literature and arts, founded in 2005. As of 2013, she is Editor-in-Chief of Jaggery, "A DesiLit Arts and Literature Journal". Mohanraj was a host for season 12 of the Writing Excuses podcast.

Mohanraj's writing frequently explores issues of cultural identity. She has noted in interviews that she feels the complexity of such issues in her own life: "When people ask me what my identity is, I could say I'm Sri Lankan-American ... I could say I was raised Catholic but now I'm agnostic. I could say I've been called a queer, because although I've been with a man the past 17 years, I'm bisexual." She is also something of a sexuality activist; she founded and moderates the Internet Erotica Writers' Workshop, and was a former moderator for soc.sexuality.general.

Mohanraj has had stories published in the Wild Cards science fiction shared universe edited by George R. R. Martin., and has announced that she will have further stories in forthcoming Wild Cards anthologies Fort Freak, Lowball, Low Chicago, Joker Moon, and Three Kings.

== Personal life ==
On February 12, 2015, she announced in her blog that she had been diagnosed with breast cancer. She has been documenting the treatment (including chemotherapy and a lumpectomy) in a "Cancer Log" on her website. On February 24, 2015, she married Kevin Whyte, with whom she had had a domestic partnership for 23 years.

In 2017, Mohanraj ran for the Oak Park library board. Democracy for America endorsed her candidacy. She was elected on April 4, 2017. In April 2021, she was elected to the D200 school board, which governs Oak Park and River Forest High School.

== Awards and honors ==
- 2018 Imadjinn Award for Best Non-Fiction Book (Invisible 3: Essays and Poems on Representation in SF/F, with co-editor Jim C. Hines), winner
- 2019 Locus Special Award for Community Outreach & Development, winner

== Bibliography ==
=== Fiction ===
- Kathryn in the City: A Choose-Your-Own-Erotic-Adventure (Melcher Media, 2003) (ISBN 1-59240-030-2)
- The Classics Professor: A Choose-Your-Own-Erotic-Adventure (Melcher Media, 2003) (ISBN 1-59240-031-0)
- Bodies in Motion: Stories (HarperCollins, 2005) (ISBN 0-06-078118-1)
- The Stars Change (Circlet Press, 2013) (ISBN 978-1-61390-084-0)
- Perennial: A Garden Romance (Lethe Press, 2018) (ISBN 978-1-59021-640-8)

=== Mixed-genre collections ===
- Torn Shapes of Desire (IAM [Intangible Assets Manufacturing], 1997) (ISBN 1-885876-03-3)
- Silence and the Word (Lethe Press, 2004) (ISBN 1-59021-014-X)
- Without a Map [with Nnedi Okorafor] (Aqueduct Press, 2010) (ISBN 978-1-93350-041-6)

=== Nonfiction ===
- A Taste of Serendib: A Sri Lankan Cookbook (Lethe Press, 2003) (ISBN 1-59021-100-6)
- A Feast of Serendib: Recipes from Sri Lanka (2020) (ISBN 978-1-64543-275-3)
- Vegan Serendib: Recipes from Sri Lanka (Serendib Press, 2022) ISBN 978-1-73304093-8 Mary Anne Mohanraj in libraries (WorldCat catalog)
- Tornado: A Breast Cancer Log (Riverdale Avenue Books, 2023) ISBN 978-1-62601647-7

=== Children's literature ===
- The Poet's Journey (Serendib Press, 2008) (ISBN 978-0-615-18889-8) [as "Amirthi Mohanraj"]

=== Edited books ===
- Aqua Erotica (Three Rivers Press, 2000) (ISBN 0-609-80656-4)
- Wet: More Aqua Erotica (Three Rivers Press, 2002) (ISBN 0-609-80897-4)
- The Best of Strange Horizons: Year One (Lethe Press, 2003) (ISBN 1-59021-036-0)
- The WisCon Chronicles, Vol. 9: Intersections and Alliances (Aqueduct Press, 2015) (ISBN 978-1-61976-087-5)
- Invisible 3: Essays and Poems on Representation in SF/F [with Jim C. Hines] (2017) (ISBN 978-1-37070-456-9)
- Survivor [with JJ Pionke] (Lethe Press, 2018) (ISBN 978-1-59021-174-8)

=== Edited online magazines/journals ===
- Clean Sheets (founder and editor-in-chief, 1998–2000)
- Strange Horizons (founder and editor-in-chief, 2000–2003)
- Jaggery (founder; editor-in-chief, 2013–17)
