= Worlds Without End (Shadowrun novel) =

Worlds Without End is a novel by Caroline Spector published by Roc Fantasy in 1995.

== Plot summary ==
Worlds Without End is a novel in which the immortal elf Aina encounters an evil astral creature called a Horror.

== Publication history ==
Worlds Without End is a Shadowrun novel and is the final book in a crossover trilogy that started with the world of Earthdawn, although the first two novels in the series were released after this one.

== Reception ==
Andy Butcher reviewed Worlds Without End for Arcane magazine, rating it a 5 out of 10 overall. Butcher comments that "As the first real cross-over between Earthdawn and Shadowrun, Worlds Without End is something of a disappointment. It starts well and reveals some interesting details about the real powers in the world of Shadowrun, but the climax arrives all too soon, and is less than stunning. Part of the problem is that you're left with the distinct feeling that you've missed a lot of what's going on - perhaps once the two prequels have been released, it'll all make a bit more sense..."
