= The Inferior =

2007 book by Peadar Ó Guilín

- Author: Peadar Ó Guilín
- Language: English
- Series: The Bone World Trilogy
- Genre: Science fiction novel
- Publisher: David Fickling Books
- Publication date: September 6, 2007
- Publication place: Ireland
- Pages: 440
- ISBN: 978-0-385-61095-7
- OCLC: 137313055
- Followed by: The Deserter

The Inferior is a 2007 novel by Peadar Ó Guilín. It begins as a fantasy novel, then develops characteristics generally attributed to science fiction novels. The book has been marketed as YA fiction.

== Characters ==
- Stopmouth - the main character. A young man, in his late teens or early twenties. He is from the Human Tribe. Stopmouth is named because of his stuttering way of speech. He is generally looked down on by the rest of his tribe because of this, many of them thinking he is dim-witted. His speed is unmatched in the tribe.
- Wallbreaker - Stopmouth's brother. He is very observant, and prefers to hunt methodically using traps rather than using sheer force. By using his cunning intellect, he becomes Chief after Speareye's untimely death.
- Speareye - the Chief of the Human Tribe. He is a well-respected leader and dies honorably in battle.
- Indrani - a mysterious woman who falls from the sky. Most members of the Human Tribe are fearful of her dark skin and abnormally perfect figure. She is hauntingly beautiful. A language barrier keeps her from communicating with the human tribe, but as time progresses, she begins to learn the language.
- Rockface - a good friend to Stopmouth. Decorated with tattoos recounting his heroic deeds, he is a very respected man in the tribe and a superb hunter - his strength is envied.
- Mossheart - the love interest of both Wallbreaker and Stopmouth. After her marriage to Wallbreaker early in the novel, Stopmouth's feelings for her eventually recede.
- Varaha - a man of similar complexion and perfection to Indrani. His physical prowess and hunting abilities are far superior to the primitive tribe members.
- Crunchfist - the strongest member of the Human Tribe. He is cruel and harsh, and is feared more than respected. He is undoubtedly the fiercest man Stopmouth has ever met.

== Plot summary ==
Stopmouth is a member of the Human tribe, which is on the verge of extinction. There is a vast variety of different species of sentient creatures, all of whom either have made alliances with the humans, or hunt them as a source of food. In return, in order to survive in this barbaric world, the humans hunt other species and "trade flesh", a tradition that has the humans trade the weakest and most useless members of their tribe to other species as a source of food. In the book, this is known as "volunteering", and it is considered shameful to attempt to resist being volunteered for the good of your tribe.

Stopmouth himself (who is said to be around 5,000 days old, around 13 years old) is constantly overlooked and overshadowed because of both his stuttering speech impediment and his more popular brother, Wallbreaker.

One day Stopmouth meets a woman named Indrani. Indrani fell from the sky when one of the mysterious globes that fly across the 'Roof' (the Human tribe's name for the sky, basically) explodes, and she is expelled from it. Indrani seems to be more civilized than Stopmouth's tribe, and is disdainful of them. The Human tribe believes her to be 'slow', or stupid, because she cannot speak their language, and their experience has been that there is only one Human tribe. She was going to be volunteered, but Wallbreaker took her as a wife (partly because of her beauty, and partly because one's status is raised when one has more than one wife), protecting her from being traded.

Eventually, a great war ensues over a piece of technology known to the barbarians as 'the talker'. It allows different species to communicate with each other, thus making them easier to coordinate alliances with. It eventually gets to the point where most of the species opposing the Humans are destroyed, and Wallbreaker (having been elected chief by this point) takes possession of the talker, which becomes a coveted artifact.

Stopmouth, who has come to love Indrani and resent Wallbreaker for taking her before he did, steals Indrani from him and, at her request, the talker. He is pursued across the land by his tribe until they eventually lose their pursuers.

Stopmouth (having travelled to a distant part of the land) eventually becomes the surrogate chief of a tribe of religious humans who are on the verge of being wiped out by a strange race of creatures. With his help, they learn to fend for themselves.

Indrani reveals toward the end of the book that she comes from a tribe of Humans who live in the Roof, and actually watch the Humans below fight for their lives as a form of entertainment. Stopmouth is devastated by this, but eventually they reconcile, as Indrani has come to a different view of his people, and now holds a degree of respect for them where there had only been disdain before.

The book ends when Varaha—a member of Stopmouth's new tribe of humans and a secret member of Indrani's old Roof tribe—confronts Stopmouth while Indrani is being reclaimed by her 'civilized' people. Stopmouth manages to kill Varaha, but Indrani is returned to the Roof.

== Sequel ==
The story continues in the second book of the trilogy, The Deserter, published in May 2011.

== The Author ==
Peadar Ó Guilín is an Irish author. His first novel was The Inferior, book one of The Bone World Trilogy, which was published by David Fickling in 2007 (2008 in the U.S.A.).

Peadar grew up in County Donegal on the west coast of Ireland.
