= Sage Walker =

American science-fiction writer

Sage Walker is an American science-fiction writer based in New Mexico. She contributed to the Wild Cards series and won the Locus Award in 1997 for her debut novel, Whiteout.

She was born in Oklahoma. She earned a B.S. in Zoology and then a M.D. She contributed to establishing the first full-time emergency physician coverage in hospitals in Taos, Los Alamos, and Santa Fe.

She was one of several science fiction authors who attended a 2009 United States Department of Homeland Security conference on science and technology aimed at preventing future terrorist attacks.
