= Victor Milán =

US science fiction writer (1954–2018)

- Born: Victor Woodward Milán; August 3, 1954; Tulsa, Oklahoma, U.S.
- Died: February 13, 2018 (aged 63); Albuquerque, New Mexico, U.S.

Victor Woodward Milán (August 3, 1954 – February 13, 2018) was an American writer known for libertarian science fiction and an interest in cybernetics.

== Life and career ==
Milán was born in Tulsa, Oklahoma.

In 1986 Milán won the Prometheus Award for Cybernetic Samurai. He has also written several shared universe works for the Forgotten Realms, Star Trek, BattleTech and Wild Cards series. He has also written books under the pseudonyms Richard Austin (Jove Books "The Guardians" series), Robert Baron (Jove Books "Stormrider" series), and S. L. Hunter ("Steele" series with Simon Hawke, who used the pen name J. D. Masters). He also wrote at least nine novels under the "house name" of James Axler for the Harlequin Press/Gold Eagle Books "Deathlands" and "Outlanders" series. He has published almost 100 novels and numerous short stories.

Milán was also known as the longtime masquerade emcee of Archon, the multi-genre convention held annually in Collinsville, Illinois.

Victor Milán died February 13, 2018, in Albuquerque, New Mexico after a battle with cancer.

== Bibliography ==
=== Series and shared universes ===
Guardians series [as Richard Austin]

1. The Guardians (1985)
2. Trial by Fire (1985)
3. Thunder of Hell (1985)
4. Night of the Phoenix (1985)
5. Armageddon Run (1986)
6. War Zone (1986)
7. Brute Force (1987)
8. Desolation Road (1987)
9. Vengeance Day (1987)
10. Freedom Fight (1987)
11. Valley of the Gods (1988)
12. The Plague Years (1988)
13. Devil's Deal (1989)
14. Death from Above (1990)

Stormrider series [as Robert Baron]

1. Stormrider (1992)
2. River of Fire (1993)
3. Lord of the Plains (1993)

Donovan Steele series [as S. L. Hunter]

- Fugitive Steele (1991)
- Molten Steele (1991)

Battletech series

- Close Quarters (1994)
- Hearts of Chaos (1996)
- Black Dragon (1996)

Tokugawa

- The Cybernetic Samurai (1985)
- The Cybernetic Shogun (1990)

War of Powers

- The Sundered Realm (1980) with Robert E. Vardeman
- The City in the Glacier (1980) with Robert E. Vardeman
- The Destiny Stone (1980) with Robert E. Vardeman
- The Fallen Ones (1982) with Robert E. Vardeman
- In the Shadow of Omizantrim (1982) with Robert E. Vardeman
- Demon of the Dark Ones (1982) with Robert E. Vardeman

Star Trek: TOS

- From the Depths (1993)

Wild Cards

- Turn of the Cards (1993)

Forgotten Realms

- War in Tethyr (1995) with Walter Velez

Mechwarrior

- Flight of the Falcon (2004)
- A Rending of Falcons (2007)

Rogue Angel series [as Alex Archer]

- Solomon's Jar (2006)
- The Chosen (2007)
- The Lost Scrolls (2007)
- Secret of the Slaves (2007)

The Dinosaur Lords Series

This was intended to be a series of six books set in a world named Paradise. The first trilogy of the main six books is called The Ballad of Karyl's Last Ride. The author stated in 2017 that he planned to write other short stories, novellas, and novels that take place in Paradise beside the main series. However, he died before they were completed.

- The Dinosaur Lords (28 July 2015)
- The Dinosaur Knights (5 July 2016)
- The Dinosaur Princess (15 August 2017) ISBN 978-0-7653-3298-1

=== Stand-alone novels ===
- Western (1981)
- Runespear (1987) with Melinda M. Snodgrass
- Red Sands (1992)
- CLD: Collective Landing Detachment (1995)
