= Melinda M. Snodgrass =

American science fiction writer (born 1951)

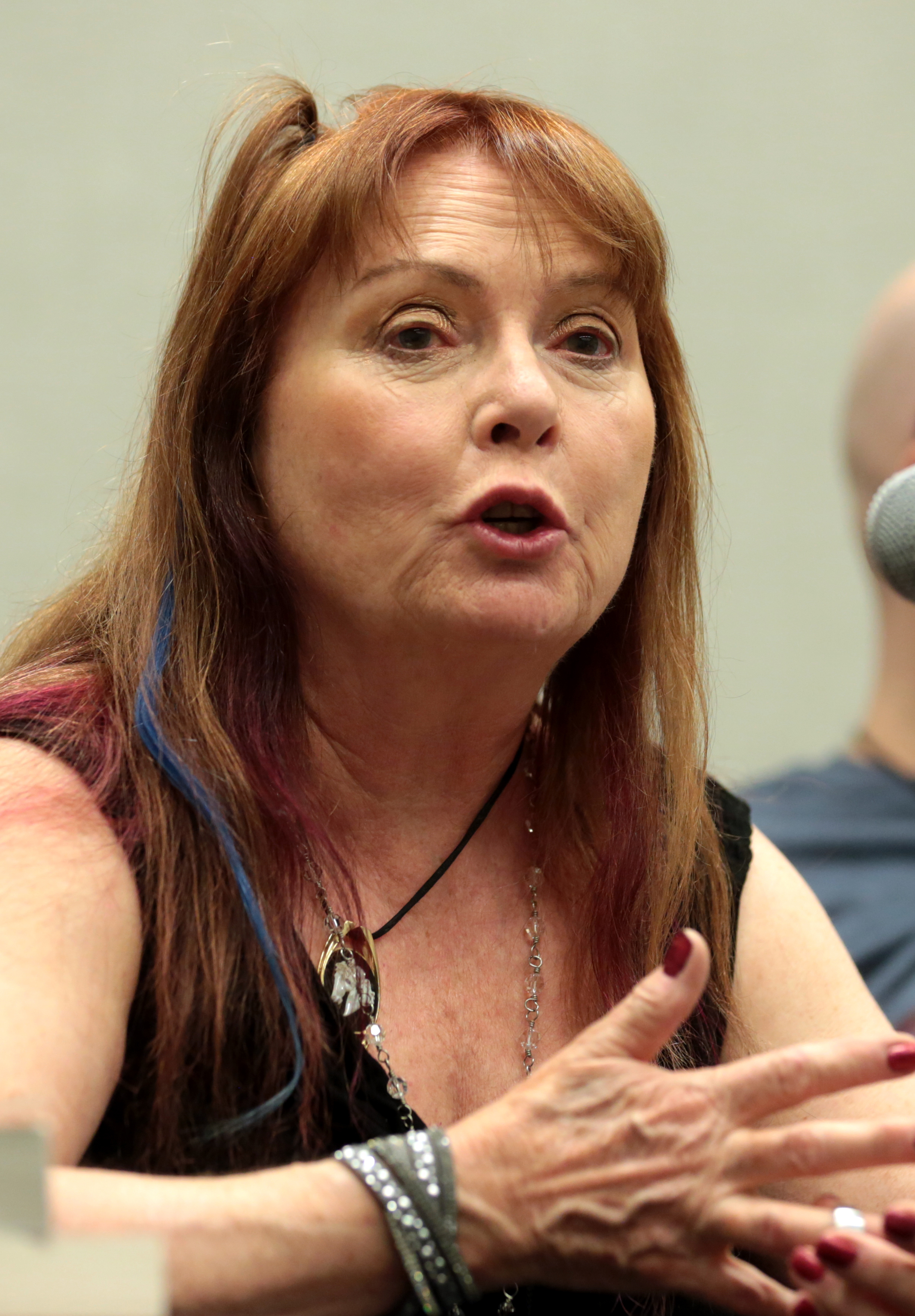
- Snodgrass at the 2018 Phoenix Comic Fest
- Born: November 27, 1951 (age 74) Los Angeles, California, U.S.
- Occupation: Writer
- Genre: Science fiction, television
- Notable works: Wildcards anthology series

Melinda Marilyn Snodgrass (born November 27, 1951) is an American science fiction writer for print and television.

== Life ==
Snodgrass lives in Santa Fe, New Mexico. In her spare time she is an equestrian who competes in dressage competition.

Snodgrass holds a degree in history from the University of New Mexico and worked as a lawyer for three years after graduating from the University of New Mexico School of Law in 1977 and passing the bar. Her experience as a lawyer informed the Linnet Ellery series she published under the pen name Phillipa Bornikova (This Case Is Gonna Kill Me, 2012; Box Office Poison, 2013; Publish and Perish, 2018, all by Tor Books).

== Career ==
Snodgrass wrote several episodes of Star Trek: The Next Generation while serving as the series' story editor during its second and third seasons. She has also contributed produced scripts for the series Odyssey 5, The Outer Limits, seaQuest DSV, and Reasonable Doubts; she was also a consulting producer on The Profiler.

She has also written science fiction novels and short stories, notably the Circuit trilogy and is the co-editor and a frequent story contributor to George R. R. Martin's long-running Wild Cards shared world series.

Snodgrass helped recover a version of the award-winning Star Trek: The Next Generation episode "The Measure of a Man" by saving an old VHS cassette. This allowed a new version to be reconstructed from existing film shots, and an extended cut with 13 minutes of additional footage was released in HD in 2012.

In February 2021 Snodgrass was the Screenwriting Guest of Honor and Keynote Speaker at the 39th annual Life, the Universe, & Everything professional science fiction and fantasy arts symposium.

== Works ==
=== Television ===
==== Star Trek: The Next Generation ====
- "The Measure of a Man" (1989)
- "Pen Pals" (1989)
- "Up the Long Ladder" (1989)
- "The Ensigns of Command" (1989)
- "The High Ground" (1990)

==== L.A. Law ====
- "Dances with Sharks" (1991)

==== Beyond Reality ====
- "Enemy in Our Midst" (1991)

==== Reasonable Doubts ====
- "FAP" (1992)
- "Silence" (1992)
- "Legacy" (1993)
- "The Ties That Bind" (1993)

==== The Outer Limits ====
- "The Sandkings" (1995) (from a story by George R. R. Martin)
- "Living Hell" (1995)

=== Short stories ===
- Wild Cards series
  - "Degradation Rites" (1987) in Wild Cards
  - “Relative Difficulties” (1987) in Aces High
  - “Mirrors of the Soul” (1988) in Aces Abroad
  - “Blood Ties” (1988) in Down and Dirty
  - “The Devil's Triangle” in One-Eyed Jacks
  - “Lovers Parts I-VI” (19) in Jokertown Shuffle
  - "Galahad in Blue" (2014) in Lowball
- “The Wayfarer’s Advice” (2010) in Songs of Love and Death, anthology edited by George R. R. Martin and Gardner Dozois
- "No Mystery, No Miracle" (2011) in Down These Strange Streets, anthology edited by George R. R. Martin and Gardner Dozois
- "Written in Dust" (2013) in Old Mars, anthology edited by George R. R. Martin and Gardner Dozois
- "The Hands That Are Not There" (2013) in Dangerous Women, anthology edited by George R. R. Martin and Gardner Dozois

=== Novels ===
==== Star Trek ====
- The Tears of the Singers (1984)

==== Circuit ====
- Circuit (1986)
- Circuit Breaker (1987)
- Final Circuit (1988)

==== Stand-alone ====
- Runespear (1987) with Victor Milán
- Queen's Gambit Declined (1989)

==== Wild Cards ====
- Double Solitaire (1992)

==== The Edge ====
- The Edge of Reason (2008)
- The Edge of Ruin (2010)
- The Edge of Dawn (2015)

==== The Imperials Saga ====
- The High Ground (2016)
- In Evil Times (2017)
- The Hidden World (2018)
- Currency of War (2019)
- The Thucydides Trap (2023)

==== Writing as Phillipa Bornikova ====
===== Linnet Ellery series =====
- This Case Is Gonna Kill Me (2012)
- Box Office Poison (2013)
- Publish and Perish (2018)
