= Peter Newman (author) =

English fantasy author

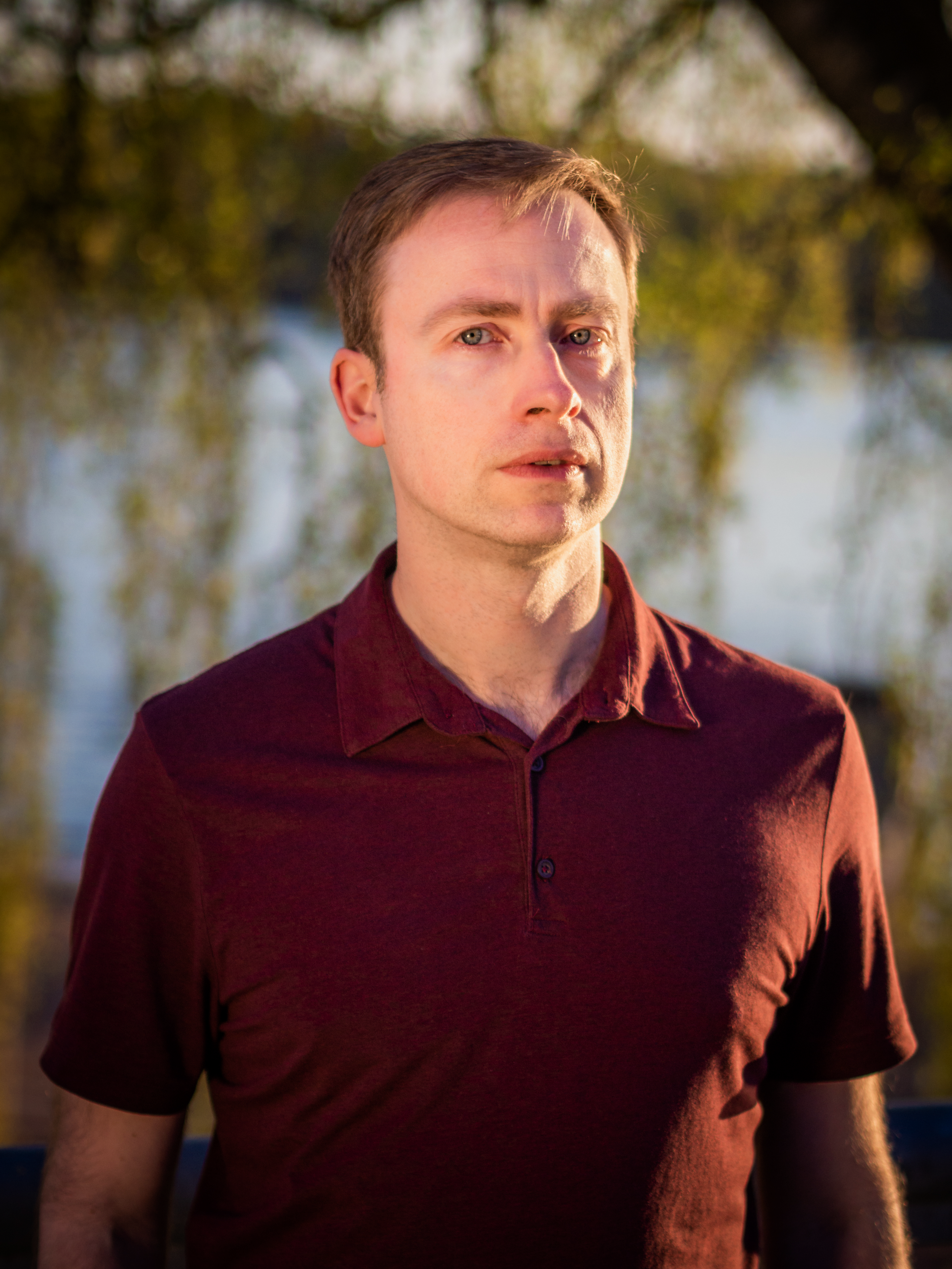
- Peter Newman at Åcon 2018.
- Born: London, England
- Education: Central School of Speech and Drama
- Writing career
- Period: 2015–present

Peter Newman is an English author of fantasy novels and short stories, including the Gemmell Award-winning The Vagrant. He is also co-writer of the Hugo Award winning Tea and Jeopardy podcast.

== Personal life ==
Growing up in and around London, Newman studied Drama and Education at the Central School of Speech and Drama, going on to work as a secondary school drama teacher.

== Writing career ==
=== The Vagrant Trilogy ===
- The Vagrant (winner of the Morningstar Award for best debut novel at the David Gemmell Awards 2016)
- The Malice
- The Seven

=== The Deathless Trilogy ===
- The Deathless
- The Ruthless
- The Boundless

=== Short stories ===
- The Vagrant and the City
- The Hammer and the Goat
