= Stephen Leigh =

American science fiction writer

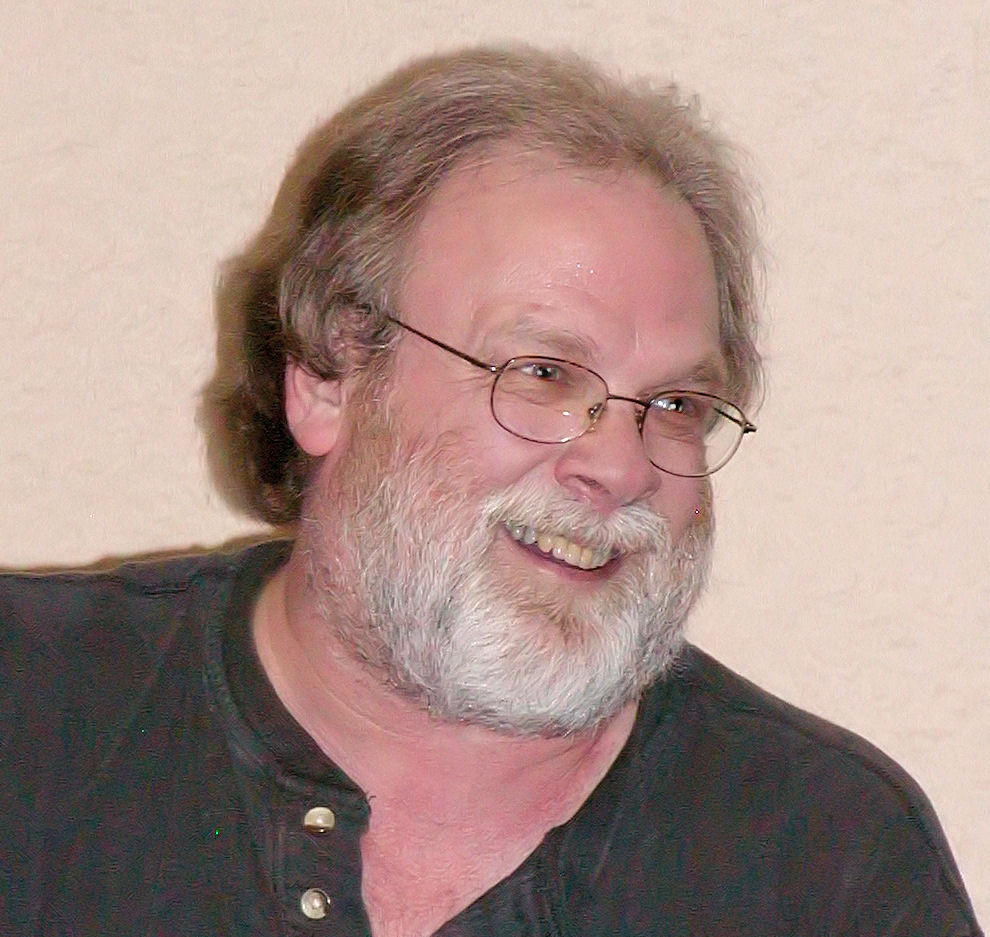
- Leigh in 2008
- Born: Stephen Walter Leigh; February 27, 1951 (age 75); Cincinnati, Ohio, U.S.
- Occupation: Writer
- Spouse: Denise
- Children: 2
- Writing career
- Pen name: S. L. Farrell, Matthew Farrell, Sleigh
- Period: 1976–present
- Genre: Science fiction
- Website: www.farrellworlds.com

Stephen W. Leigh (born February 27, 1951) is an American science fiction and fantasy writer, artist, and musician. He also works as a lecturer at Northern Kentucky University, teaching creative writing. He has published speculative fiction as Stephen Leigh, as S. L. Farrell, and once as Matthew Farrell.

Steve Leigh was born in Cincinnati, Ohio, and lives there. He plays guitar and sings in a band named Toast.

== Recognition ==
Leigh's novel Dark Water's Embrace won the Spectrum Award in 1999 and was on the long list for the James Tiptree Jr. Award that year. Speaking Stones also made the long list for the Tiptree Award. His first novel, Slow Fall to Dawn, was in the Top Ten for the Locus Award for Best First Novel.

As Guest of Honor at Bubonicon 43 Leigh was interviewed for MTV Geek Coverage about working on the Wild Cards series.

A special one-shot convention was held in his honor in Minneapolis, April 11–13, 2008, called Applecon. The convention listed its guests as Music Guest of Honor Stephen Leigh, Writer Guest of Honor S.L. Farrell, Artist Guest of Honor Sleigh, Fan Guest of Honor Steve.

== Works ==
- "In Darkness Waiting (short story)", Asimov's Science Fiction, Fall 1977 (July) — expanded as the 1981–1984 Neweden trilogy
- Slow Fall to Dawn (Bantam Books, October 1981)
- Dance of the Hag (Bantam, March 1983)
- A Quiet of Stone (Bantam, February 1984)
- The Bones of God (Avon Books, November 1986)
- The Crystal Memory (Avon, September 1987)
- The Secret of the Lona (Dr. Bones #1) (Ace Books, September 1988)
- Changeling: Robots & Aliens #1 (Ace, August 1989); Isaac Asimov's Robot City: Robots and Aliens #1
- The Abraxas Marvel Circus (Roc Books (Penguin), May 1990)
- Alien Tongue (Bantam, August 1991)
- Dinosaur World (AvoNova (Avon), May 1992)
- Dinosaur Planet (AvoNova, February 1993)
- Dinosaur Samurai (AvoNova, November 1993), by Leigh and John J. Miller
- Dinosaur Warriors (AvoNova, June 1994)
- Dinosaur Empire (AvoNova, March 1995), by Leigh and John J. Miller
- Dinosaur Conquest (AvoNova, October 1995)
- Dark Water's Embrace (Eos Books (Avon), March 1998)
- Speaking Stones (Eos, March 1999)
- Thunder Rift (Eos, May 2001), as Matthew Farrell
- Holder of Lightning (DAW Books, January 2003), as S. L. Farrell
- Mage of Clouds (DAW, January 2004), as S. L. Farrell
- Heir of Stone (DAW, January 2005), as S. L. Farrell
- A Magic of Twilight (DAW, February 2008), as S. L. Farrell
- A Magic of Nightfall (DAW, March 2009), as S. L. Farrell
- A Magic of Dawn (DAW, April 2010), as S. L. Farrell
- The Woods (ebook, April 2011)
- Assassins' Dawn (DAW Books, May, 2013 - reprint omnibus edition of the Neweden trilogy: "Slow Fall To Dawn," "Dance of the Hag," and "A Quiet of Stone")
- Immortal Muse (DAW Books, March 2014)
- "Bones of Air, Bones of Stone" (2015) in Old Venus (anthology)
- The Crow of Connemara (DAW Books, 2015)
- A Fading Sun (DAW Books, 2017)
- A Rising Moon (DAW Books, 2018)
- Amid the Crowd of Stars (DAW Books, 2021)
