= Diana Rowland =

American novelist

- Occupation: Novelist
- Writing career
- Pen name: Diana Rowland
- Period: 2009 to present
- Genre: Fantasy
- Website: www.dianarowland.com/bio.html

Diana Rowland is an urban fantasy writer and is best known for her Kara Gillian Series and White Trash Zombie Series. She has worked as a bartender, a blackjack dealer, a pit boss, a street cop, a detective, a computer forensics specialist, a crime scene investigator, and a morgue assistant. She presently lives in south Louisiana with her husband and her daughter.

Diana Rowland is a graduate of the 1998 Clarion West Writers Workshop. In 2005, Rowland won first place in the third quarter of the Writers of the Future contest for her short story "Schroedinger's Hummingbird." This was her first time entering the contest. In 2011 Rowland was nominated for an RT Reviewer's Choice award for Best Urban Fantasy Protagonist for her character Angel Crawford from My Life as a White Trash Zombie. In 2012 Rowland was again nominated for Best Urban Fantasy Protagonist for Angel Crawford, this time for Even White Trash Zombies Get the Blues, and won. In 2013 Rowland received an RT Reviewer's Choice nomination for Best Urban Fantasy Worldbuilding for Touch of the Demon.

In 2012 the audiobook of My Life as a White Trash Zombie, narrated by Allison McLemore, was nominated for an Audie award.

== Bibliography ==
=== Kara Gillian series ===
A series that starts with Homicide Detective Kara Gillian accidentally summoning a demonic lord while investigating a string of murders.

1. Mark of the Demon ISBN 978-0553592351
2. Blood of the Demon ISBN 978-0553592368
3. Secrets of the Demon ISBN 978-0756406523
4. Sins of the Demon ISBN 978-0756407056
5. Touch of the Demon ISBN 978-0756407759
6. Fury of the Demon ISBN 978-0756408305
7. Vengeance of the Demon ISBN 978-0756408268
8. Legacy of the Demon ISBN 978-0756408275
9. Rise of the Demon ISBN 978-0756408282

=== White Trash Zombie series ===
1. My Life As a White Trash Zombie (2011) ISBN 978-0756406752
2. Even White Trash Zombies Get the Blues (2012) ISBN 978-0756407506
3. White Trash Zombie Apocalypse (2013) ISBN 978-0756408039
4. How the White Trash Zombie Got Her Groove Back (2014) ISBN 978-0756408220
5. White Trash Zombie Gone Wild (Release date: October, 6th 2015) ISBN 978-0756408237
6. White Trash Zombie Unchained (Release date: September 5, 2017) ISBN 978-0756408244

=== Short fiction ===
1. "Extant"-- The Age of Reason: Stories for a new Millenium, edited by Kurt Roth 1999 (Honorable Mention in the 17th Annual Year's Best Science Fiction)
2. "Schroedinger's Hummingbird" -- L. Ron Hubbard presents Writers of the Future Vol. XXII 2006
3. "Fine Print" -- The Wild Side, edited by Mark Van Name. 2011
4. "City Lazarus" -- Dangerous Women, edited by George R.R. Martin and Gardner Dozois, 2013
5. "Beasts, Bugs and Boys" -- Texas Hold'em: A Wild Cards Novel (Book Three of the American Triad), edited by George R.R. Martin, 2018

== Interviews ==
- "SDCC 2011 Video interview: Diana Rowland" at suvudu.com
- "Fangs for the Fantasy interview with Diana Rowland"
