= Marko Kloos =

American novelist (born 1971)

- Marko Kloos in 2017
- Born: 25 October 1971 (age 55); Germany
- Citizenship: America
- Occupation: Science fiction author
- Children: 2
- Writing career
- Language: Dutch, English, German
- Period: 2013-Current
- Genre: Military science fiction
- Notable works: The Frontlines series and the Palladium Wars series
- Website: markokloos.com

Marko Kloos is a German-American author of military science fiction and high fantasy. Born in Germany, Kloos lives and works in the United States.

== Work ==
Kloos is best known for his Frontlines series of military science fiction novels. Featuring the protagonist Andrew Grayson, they are set in a future in which a Western and an Eastern power bloc are at war with each other and with an alien threat.

Reviewing the first novel, Terms of Enlistment, io9 described it as sticking close to the conventions of the genre, focusing on "guns, acronyms, hard-ass drill sergeants, explosions and battles on alien worlds". The reviewer considered the second novel, Lines of Departure, to be an improvement in that it reflected a critical outlook towards powerful, centralized government that was often absent in leading works of the genre such as Robert Heinlein's Starship Troopers.

Lines of Departure was nominated for the 2015 Hugo Award for Best Novel on a slate organized by the "Sad Puppies", a group of "right-leaning science fiction writers." In reaction to this, Kloos withdrew the novel from consideration for the award. He was subsequently honored by George R. R. Martin for this decision.

In 2019, his short stories, Lucky Thirteen and On The Use Of Shape-Shifters In Warfare, were adapted as part of the Netflix anthology series Love, Death & Robots.

Aftershocks, the first book in a new series, "The Palladium Wars," was released in July 2019.

== Personal life ==
Kloos served in the West German military as a junior NCO from 1989 to 1993. He drew upon these experiences in his military science fiction.

Kloos lives in New Hampshire with his family and has been employed as "a soldier, a bookseller, a freight dock worker, a tech support drone, and a corporate IT administrator". He is a graduate of the Viable Paradise writers' workshop.

In 2026, Kloos is the Democratic Party candidate for New Hampshire State Representative in Grafton District 18. Kloos defeated his opponent to become NH State House Representative-Elect on Nov. 4, 2026.

== Bibliography ==
=== Frontlines series ===
Novels

1. Terms of Enlistment (2013), ISBN 978-1-4778-0978-5, 47North
2. Lines of Departure (2014), ISBN 978-1-4778-1740-7, 47North
3. Angles of Attack (2015), ISBN 978-1-4778-2831-1, 47North
4. Chains of Command (2016), ISBN 978-1-5039-5032-0, 47North
5. Fields of Fire (2017), ISBN 978-1-5039-4071-0, 47North
6. Points of Impact (2018), ISBN 978-1-5420-4846-0, 47North
7. Orders of Battle (2020), ISBN 978-1-5420-1958-3, 47North
8. Centers of Gravity (2022), ISBN 978-1-7136-4680-8, 47North
9. Echoes of Silence (novella) (2025), Frostbite Publishing

Chapbooks

- Lucky Thirteen (2013)
- Measures of Absolution (2013)

Comics

With Ivan Brandon:

- Frontlines: Requiem (four issues, Jet City Comics, 2016)

=== Frontlines: Evolution series ===
1. Scorpio (2023), ISBN 978-1-5420-3549-1 47North
2. Corvus (2025), ISBN 978-1662524882 47North

=== The Palladium Wars series ===
Novels

1. Aftershocks (July 1, 2019), ISBN 978-1-5420-4355-7, 47North
2. Ballistic (May 26, 2020), ISBN 978-1-5420-9007-0, 47North
3. Citadel (August 10, 2021), ISBN 978-1-5420-2724-3, 47North
4. Descent (July 16, 2024), ISBN 978-1-5420-3615-3, 47North

=== Other work ===
Short fiction

- How to Move Spheres and Influence People (2019)
- Ink and Blood (2011)
- Cake Whores of Mars (2012)
- Berlin Is Never Berlin (2020)
