= Peadar Ó Guilín =

Irish author

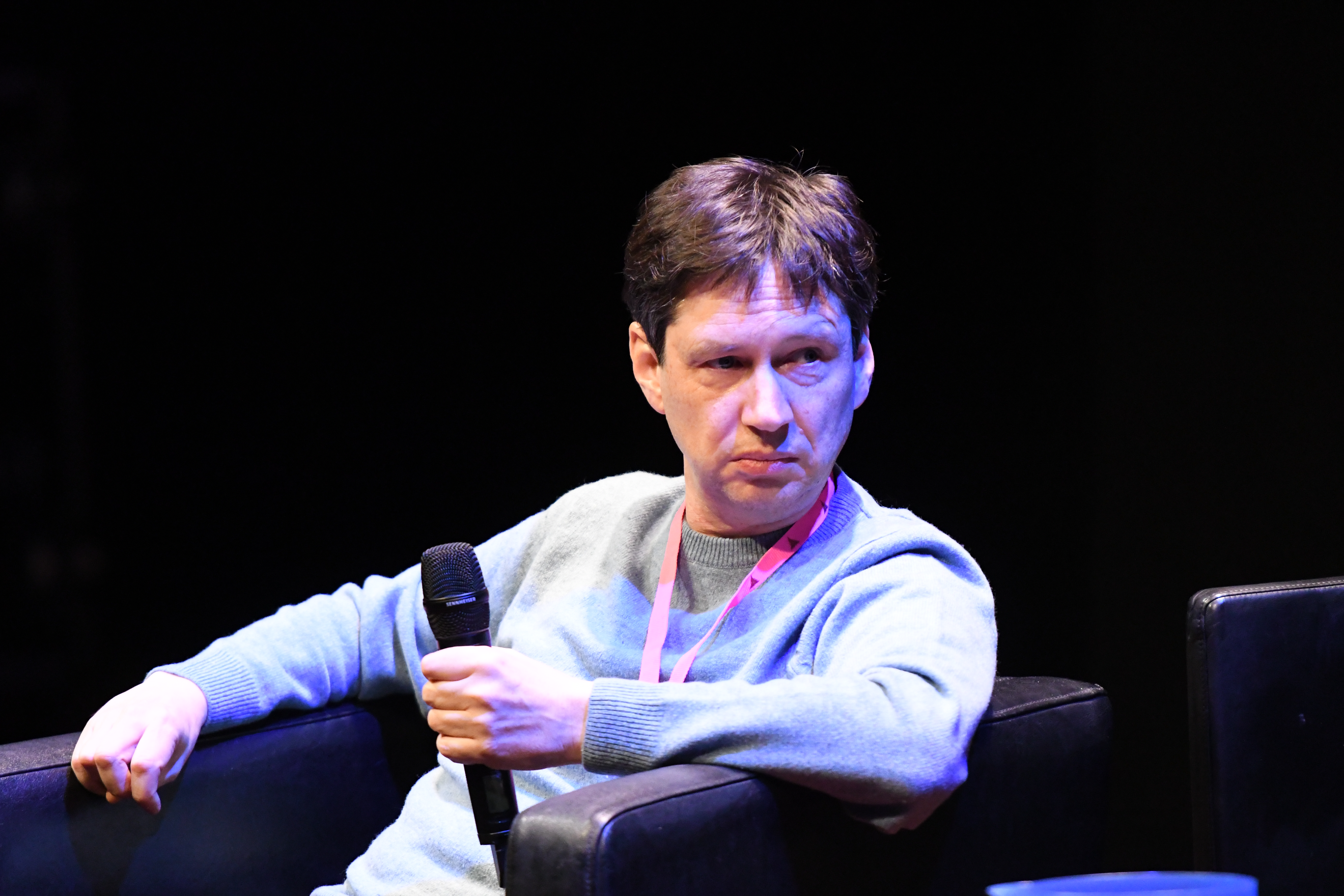
- Born: Peadar Ó Guilín
- Occupation: Writer
- Website: www.peadar.org

Peadar Ó Guilín is an Irish novelist.

== Life and work ==
Ó Guilín grew up in County Donegal though he went to school in Clongowes Wood College in County Kildare. He is now based in Dublin where he works for a computer company. Raised speaking Irish and English, Ó Guilín is also fluent in French, and Italian. He has written a number of stories and novels. His first novel, The Inferior, was published to critical acclaim in September 2007 and translations into nine languages including Japanese and Korean. Before writing novels, Ó Guilín wrote a number of plays and worked on a weekly print comic with the artist Laura Howell, Sneaky, the Cleverest Elephant in the World, aimed at kids.

The Times Educational Supplement called his first novel "a stark, dark tale, written with great energy and confidence and some arresting reflections on human nature."

== Bibliography ==
- The Inferior. RHCP. 30 September 2010. ISBN 978-1-4090-4764-3.
- The Deserter. Random House Children's Books. 13 March 2012. ISBN 978-0-375-98936-0.
- Forever in the Memory of God: And Other Stories. Kindle. 15 February 2014.
- The Volunteer. CreateSpace. 10 June 2014. ISBN 978-1499199529.
- The Call. David Fickling Books. 30 August 2016. ISBN 978-1338045611.
- The Invasion. David Fickling Books. 27 March 2018. ISBN 978-1910989647.
