= List of Ace titles in second G series =

Ace Books began its second G-series in 1964, and it ran until 1968, with serial numbers from 501 to 766.

There had previously been nine titles with a G prefix published as part of the D/G/S-series. These nine are:

- G-352 NA Francis Leary Fire And Morning (1959)
- G-371 NA Theodor Plievier Berlin (1959)
- G-376 NA J. Harvey Howells The Big Company Look (1959)
- G-382 NA C. T. Ritchie Willing Maid
- G-390 NA R. Foreman Long Pig
- G-440 NA Andrew Hepburn Letter Of Marque (1960)
- G-454 NA Anne Powers Ride East! Ride West! (1960)
- G-480 WE John Brick The Strong Men (1960)
- G-500 WE George D. Hendricks The Bad Man of the West (1961)

The nine titles above are also listed in the D/G/S-series, but are separated here for convenience.

After the numbers in the D/G/S-series reached 500, the G series began to use separate numbers. These are the titles listed below.

Some G-series numbers are not listed, and it is not known if a book corresponds to them; the missing numbers are: 516 and 517.

- G-501 MY Charlotte Armstrong Lewi (as Charlotte Armstrong) Incident At A Corner / The Unsuspected (1965)
- G-502 WE Richard O'Connor Pat Garrett (1965)
- G-503 MY Ursula Curtiss The Face Of The Tiger / The Stairway (1962)
- G-504 NA Theodor Plievier Moscow (1965)
- G-505 NA Ken Murray Ken Murray's Giant Joke Book
- G-506 MY Doris Miles Disney Black Mail / Did She Fall Or Was She Pushed?
- G-507 NA John M. Foster Hell In The Heavens
- G-508 MY Ruth Fenisong The Schemers / But Not Forgotten (1965)
- G-509 MY Elisabeth Sanxay Holding The Virgin Huntress / The Innocent Mrs. Duff (1951)
- G-510 MY Charlotte Armstrong Lewi (as Charlotte Armstrong) The Case Of The Weird Sisters (1965)
- G-511 MY Charlotte Armstrong Lewi (as Charlotte Armstrong) The Chocolate Cobweb / Who's Been Sitting In My Chair? (1965)
- G-512 MY Elisabeth S. Holding The Blank Wall / The Girl Who Had To Die (1965)
- G-513 MY Charlotte Armstrong Lewi (as Charlotte Armstrong) Then Came Two Women / Catch As Catch Can (1965)
- G-514 MY Charlotte Armstrong Lewi (as Charlotte Armstrong) Something Blue
- G-515 NA Slavomir Rawicz The Long Walk
- G-518 MY Helen Reilly Follow Me / The Opening Door (1965)
- G-519 MY Elisabeth Sanxay Holding The Old Battle Axe / The Obstinate Murderer (1965)
- G-520 NA John Jakes (as Jay Scotland) Arena
- G-521 MY Charlotte Armstrong Lewi (as Charlotte Armstrong) Mischief / The Better To Eat You (1965)
- G-522 NA Frederick Faust (as George Challis) The Firebrand
- G-523 MY Ursula Curtiss The Forbidden Garden / Hours To Kill (1965)
- G-524 MY Elisabeth Sanxay Holding Who's Afraid? / Widow's Mite (1965)
- G-525 MY Dana Lyon The Tentacles / Spin The Web Tight (1965)
- G-526 MY Charlotte Armstrong Lewi (as Charlotte Armstrong) The Mark Of The Hand / The Dream Walker (1965)
- G-527 NA Frederick Faust (as George Challis) The Bait And The Trap (1965)
- G-528 MY Helen Reilly Certain Sleep / Ding Dong Bell (1965)
- G-529 MY Dorothy Miles Disney Unappointed Rounds / Mrs. Meeker's Money (1965)
- G-530 MY Elisabeth Sanxay Holding The Unfinished Crime / Net Of Cobwebs (1963)
- G-531 MY Helen Reilly Not Me, Inspector / The Canvas Dagger (1965)
- G-532 NA John Jakes (as Jay Scotland) Traitors’ Legion (1963)
- G-533 MY Charlotte Armstrong Lewi (as Charlotte Armstrong) The Black-Eyed Stranger / The One-Faced Girl (1965)
- G-534 MY Elisabeth Sanxay Holding Kill Joy / Speak Of The Devil (1965)
- G-535 MY Dana Lyon The Lost One / The Frightened Child (1965)
- G-536 NA Helen Reilly The Day She Died
- G-537 NA Edward J. Ruppelt Unidentified Flying Objects (1965)
- G-538 NA Andre Norton Shadow Hawk (1965)
- G-539 MY Hilda Lawrence Duet In Death: Composition For Four Hands / Duet In Death: The House (1965)
- G-540 MY Charlotte Armstrong Lewi (as Charlotte Armstrong) A Little Less Than Kind (1965)
- G-541 NA Jean Potts The Evil Wish
- G-542 NA Heidi Huberta Freybe Loewengard (as Martha Albrand) Meet Me Tonight (1965)
- G-543 MY Mildred Davis The Dark Place / They Buried A Man (1965)
- G-544 NA Ruth Fenisong The Wench Is Dead (1964)
- G-545 NA Dana Lyon The Trusting Victim (1965)
- G-546 MY Helen Reilly Compartment K (1965)
- G-547 SF Austin Hall and Homer Eon Flint The Blind Spot (1965)
- G-548 MY Rohan O'Grady Let's Kill Uncle (1965)
- G-549 MY Ursula Curtiss The Iron Cobweb (1965)
- G-550 NA Theodora Du Bois The Listener (1965)
- G-551 SF Donald A. Wollheim and Terry Carr (eds.) World's Best Science Fiction: 1965 (1965)
- G-552 NA Theodora Du Bois Shannon Terror (1965)
- G-553 NA Michael Avallone The Man From U.N.C.L.E.
- G-554 NA Genevieve Holden The Velvet Target
- G-555 MY Ursula Curtis The Wasp (1965)
- G-556 NA Leonie St. John Love With a Harvard Accent (1965)
- G-557 MY Ursula Curtiss Out of the Dark
- G-558 NA Genevieve Holden Something's Happened To Kate
- G-559 NA Heidi Huberta Freybe Loewengard (as Martha Albrand) After Midnight (1965)
- G-560 NA Harry Whittington The Man From U.N.C.L.E. Number 2: The Doomsday Affair (1965)
- G-561 MY Ursula Curtiss Widow's Web (1965)
- G-562 NA Helen McCloy The Long Body (1965)
- G-563 NA Heidi Huberta Freybe Loewengard (as Martha Albrand) A Day In Monte Carlo (1965)
- G-564 NA John Oram Thomas (as John Oram) The Man From U.N.C.L.E. Number 3: The Copenhagen Affair (1965)
- G-565 MY Ursula Curtiss The Deadly Climate (1965)
- G-566 NA Irene Maude Swatridge and Charles John Swatridge (jointly as Theresa Charles) Lady In The Mist (1965)
- G-567 NA Theresa Charles The Shrouded Tower (1965)
- G-568 NA Melba Marlett Escape While I Can (1965)
- G-569 NA David Howarth We Die Alone (1965)
- G-570 SF Alan Garner The Weirdstone Of Brisingamen (1965)
- G-571 NA David McDaniel The Man From U.N.C.L.E. Number 4: The Dagger Affair (1965)
- G-572 NA Joy Packer The Man In The Mews (1966)
- G-573 WE Tom West Rattlesnake Range / Merle Constiner Top Gun From The Dakotas (1966)
- G-574 SF Avram Davidson The Kar-Chee Reign / Ursula K. Le Guin Rocannon's World (1966)
- G-575 NA Margaret Summerton Quin's Hide (1966)
- G-576 SF John Rackham Danger From Vega / Avram Davidson Clash of Star-Kings (1966)
- G-577 WE Roger Spellman Big Man From The Brazos / Ray Hogan Killer's Gun (1966)
- G-578 NA Dorothy Eden (as Mary Paradise) Shadow Of A Witch (1966)
- G-579 WE Lee E. Wells Ride A Dim Trail / Louis Trimble Showdown In The Cayuse (1966)
- G-580 SF Mack Reynolds Dawnman Planet / Claude Nunes Inherit the Earth (1966)
- G-581 NA John T. Phillifent The Man From U.N.C.L.E. Number 5: The Mad Scientist Affair (1966)
- G-582 SF Jules Verne Journey To The Center Of The Earth (1966)
- G-583 NA Marie Garratt Festival Of Darkness (1966)
- G-584 WE William E. Vance Son Of A Desparado / Dwight Bennett Newton (as Clement Hardin) The Ruthless Breed (1966)
- G-585 SF John W. Campbell The Planeteers / The Ultimate Weapon (1966)
- G-586 SF William L. Chester Hawk Of The Wilderness (1966)
- G-587 WE Lee Hoffman Gunfight At Laramie / Brian Garfield (as Frank Wynne) The Wolf Pack
- G-588 SF Lin Carter The Star Magicians / John Baxter The Off-Worlders (1966)
- G-589 NA Margaret Summerton Ring Of Mischief (1966)
- G-590 NA David McDaniel The Man From U.N.C.L.E. Number 6: The Vampire Affair (1966)
- G-591 WE Dan J. Stevens Stage To Durango / Tom West Hangrope Heritage (1966)
- G-592 SF John Rackham The Beasts of Kohl / John Brunner A Planet Of Your Own (1966)
- G-593 NA Dorothy Eden (as Mary Paradise) Face Of An Angel (1966)
- G-594 NA Charles Runyon The Bloody Jungle (1966)
- G-595 SF Andre Norton Quest Crosstime (1966)
- G-596 WE Reese Sullivan The Demanding Land / John Callahan Hackett's Feud (1966)
- G-597 SF Ursula K. Le Guin Planet of Exile / Thomas M. Disch Mankind Under the Leash (1966)
- G-598 NA Barbara James Bright Deadly Summer (1966)
- G-599 SF Andre Norton Star Guard (1966)
- G-600 NA Peter Leslie The Man From U.N.C.L.E. Number 7: The Radioactive Camel Affair (1966)
- G-601 WE John L. Shelley The Return Of Bullet Benton / Ray Hogan The Hellsfire Lawman (1966)
- G-602 SF Howard L. Cory The Mind Monsters / Philip K. Dick The Unteleported Man (1966)
- G-603 NA Carolyn Wilson The Scent of Lilacs (1966)
- G-604 NA Jess Shelton Daktari (1966)
- G-605 SF Jack Jardine (as Larry Maddock) The Flying Saucer Gambit - Agent Of T.E.R.R.A. #1 (1966)
- G-606 SF John Rackham Time to Live / Lin Carter The Man Without a Planet (1966)
- G-607 WE Merle Constiner Rain Of Fire / Tom West Bitter Brand (1966)
- G-608 NA Jean Potts The Only Good Secretary (1967)
- G-609 SF Philip E. High Reality Forbidden / A. Bertram Chandler Contraband From Otherspace (1967)
- G-610 WE John L. Shelley The Siege At Gunhammer / Frank Wynee The Lusty Breed (1967)
- G-611 SF Avram Davidson (ed.) The Best From Fantasy And Science Fiction, Twelfth Series (1967)
- G-612 NA Leal Hayes Harlequin House (1967)
- G-613 NA David McDaniel The Man From U.N.C.L.E. Number 8: The Monster Wheel Affair (1967)
- G-614 SF Walt Richmond & Leigh Richmond Shock Wave / Frederick L. Shaw, Jr. Envoy to the Dog Star (1967)
- G-615 WE Ray Hogan Legacy Of The Slash M / William Vance Tracker (1967)
- G-616 NA Marion Zimmer Bradley Souvenir Of Monique (1967)
- G-617 NA Peter Leslie The Man From U.N.C.L.E. Number 9: The Diving Dames Affair (1967)
- G-618 SF Emil Petaja The Stolen Sun / H. Warner Munn The Ship From Atlantis (1967)
- G-619 WE Barry Cord Gallows Ghost / Stephen Payne Room To Swing A Loop
- G-620 SF Jack Jardine (as Larry Maddock) The Golden Goddess Gambit - Agent Of T.E.R.R.A. #2 (1967)
- G-621 NA Elizabeth Kelly (as Elizabeth Kellier) Matravers Hall (1967)
- G-622 WE Tom West Showdown At Serano / Dwight Bennett Newton (as Clement Hardin) The Paxman Feud (1967)
- G-623 SF Philip E. High These Savage Futurians / John Rackham The Double Invaders (1967)
- G-624 NA Velma Tate (as Francine Davenport) The Secret Of The Bayou (1967)
- G-625 SF Kenneth Bulmer To Outrun Doomsday (1967)
- G-626 SF Ursula K. Le Guin City Of Illusions (1967)
- G-627 SF Fritz Leiber The Big Time (1967)
- G-628 WE Clifton Adams Shorty (1967)
- G-629 NA Elizabeth Kelly (as Elizabeth Kellier) Nurse Missing (1967)
- G-630 SF Andre Norton Warlock Of The Witch World (1967)
- G-631 SF Neil R. Jones The Sunless World: Professor Jameson Space Adventure #2 (1967)
- G-632 SF A. Bertram Chandler Nebula Alert / Mack Reynolds The Rival Rigelians (1967)
- G-633 WE Wayne C. Lee Return To Gunpoint / Dan J. Stevens The Killers From Owl Creek
- G-634 SF Poul Anderson War Of The Wing-Men (1967)
- G-635 NA Lena Brooke Mcnamara Pilgrim's End (1967)
- G-636 NA Joan C. Holly (as J. Holly Hunter) The Man From U.N.C.L.E. Number 10: The Assassination Affair (1967)
- G-637 SF Philip K. Dick and Ray Nelson The Ganymede Takeover (1967)
- G-638 WE Edwin Booth A Time To Shoot / Merle Constiner The Action At Redstone Creek
- G-639 SF Edmond Hamilton The Weapon From Beyond: Starwolf Series #1 (1967)
- G-640 SF Thomas Burnett Swann The Weirwoods (1967)
- G-641 SF Jack Williamson Bright New Universe (1967)
- G-642 WE Louis Trimble Standoff At Massacre Buttes / Kyle Hollingshead Echo Of A Texas Rifle (1967)
- G-643 NA Jean Vicary Saverstall (1967)
- G-644 SF Jack Jardine (as Larry Maddock) The Emerald Elephant Gambit : Agent Of T.E.R.R.A. #3
- G-645 NA Gene DeWeese and Robert Coulson (jointly as Thomas Stratton) The Man From U.N.C.L.E. Number 11: The Invisibility Affair (1967)
- G-646 SF Andre Norton The X Factor (1967)
- G-647 SF Will F. Jenkins (as Murray Leinster) S.O.S. From Three Worlds (1967)
- G-648 WE William Vance The Raid At Crazyhorse / Tom West Crossfire At Barbed M (1967)
- G-649 SF John Brunner The World Swappers (1967)
- G-650 SF Neil R. Jones Space War: Professor Jameson Space Adventure #3
- G-651 NA Elizabeth Salter Once Upon A Tombstone (1967)
- G-652 NA Michael Bonner The Disturbing Death of Jenkin Delaney (1967)
- G-653 NA Arlene Hale Doctor's Daughter (1967)
- G-654 SF Andre Norton Catseye (1967)
- G-655 SF Andre Norton Witch World (1967)
- G-656 SF John Jakes When The Star Kings Die (1967)
- G-657 WE Nelson C. Nye Rider on the Roan (1967)
- G-658 NA Rona Shambrook (as Rona Randall) Leap In The Dark (1967)
- G-659 WE Dwight Bennett Newton (as Clement Hardin) The Oxbow Deed / John Callahan Kincaid (1967)
- G-660 SF A. E. van Vogt The Universe Maker (1967)
- G-661 SF James Holbrook Vance (as Jack Vance) Big Planet (1967)
- G-662 NA Agnes Mary Robertson Dunlop (as Elisabeth Kyle) The Second Mally Lee (1967)
- G-663 NA Gene DeWeese and Robert Coulson (jointly as Thomas Stratton) The Man From U.N.C.L.E. Number 12: The Mind-Twisters Affair (1967)
- G-664 SF John Brunner Born Under Mars (1967)
- G-665 WE L. L. Foreman Silver Flame
- G-666 NA Elizabeth Kelly (as Elizabeth Kellier) Wayneston Hospital (1967)
- G-667 SF David McDaniel The Arsenal Out Of Time (1967)
- G-668 WE Brian Garfield (as Brian Wynne) A Badge For A Badman / Ray Hogan Devil's Butte (1967)
- G-669 SF Leigh Brackett The Coming Of The Terrans (1967)
- G-670 NA David McDaniel The Man From U.N.C.L.E. Number 13: The Rainbow Affair (1967)
- G-671 WE Lewis B. Patten The Star and the Gun (1967)
- G-672 NA Arlene Hale University Nurse (1967)
- G-673 SF Mark S. Geston Lords Of The Starship
- G-674 WE William Vance No Man's Brand / Merle Constiner Two Pistols South Of Deadwood (1967)
- G-675 SF James White The Secret Visitors (1967)
- G-676 NA John Sawyer and Nancy Buckingham Sawyer (as Nancy Buckingham) Storm In The Mountains (1967)
- G-677 SF Damon Knight Turning On: Thirteen Stories (1967)
- G-678 WE L. L. Foreman The Plundering Gun
- G-679 NA Willo Davis Roberts Nurse At Mystery Villa (1967)
- G-680 SF Kenneth Bulmer Cycle Of Nemesis (1967)
- G-681 SF Neil R. Jones Twin Worlds: Professor Jameson Space Adventure #4 (1967)
- G-682 WE John Callahan Ride For Vengeance / Tom West Bandit Brand
- G-683 SF Leigh Brackett The Big Jump (1967)
- G-684 NA Barbara James Beauty That Must Die (1968)
- G-685 WE Herbert Purdum My Brother John
- G-686 NA Ray Dorien The Odds Against Nurse Pat (1968)
- G-687 WE Dan J. Stevens Stranger In Rampart / Eric Allen The Hanging At Whiskey Smith
- G-688 SF John Holbrook Vance (as Jack Vance) City Of The Chasch: Planet Of Adventure #1 (1968)
- G-689 NA Ron Ellik and Fredric Langley (jointly as Fredric Davies) The Man From U.N.C.L.E. Number 14: The Cross of Gold Affair (1968)
- G-690 SF Andre Norton The Beast Master (1968)
- G-691 SF Andre Norton Lord Of Thunder
- G-692 SF Otis Adelbert Kline The Swordsman Of Mars (1968)
- G-693 SF Otis Adelbert Kline The Outlaws Of Mars (1968)
- G-694 SF Thomas Burnett Swann The Dolphin And The Deep (1968)
- G-695 WE Theodore V. Olsen Bitter Grass
- G-696 NA Arlene Hale Emergency Call (1968)
- G-697 SF Poul Anderson We Claim These Stars (1968)
- G-698 WE Ray Hogan Trouble At Tenkiller / Kyle Hollingshead The Franklin Raid (1968)
- G-699 NA Cornell Woolrich The Bride Wore Black (1968)
- G-700 NA Elizabeth Salter Will To Survive (1968)
- G-701 SF Edmond Hamilton The Closed Worlds: Starwolf #2 (1968)
- G-702 NA William Johnston Miracle At San Tanco: The Flying Nun (1968)
- G-703 SF Andre Norton Victory On Janus (1968)
- G-704 WE Carse Boyd Navarro (1962)
- G-705 WE Barry Cord The Long Wire / Merle Constiner Killers' Corral (1968)
- G-706 SF Samuel R. Delany The Jewels Of Aptor (1968)
- G-707 NA T.E. Huff (as Edwina Marlowe) The Master of Phoenix Hall (1968)
- G-708 WE Clifton Adams A Partnership With Death (1968)
- G-709 SF John Brunner Bedlam Planet (1968)
- G-710 WE Tom West The Face Behind The Mask / Louis Trimble Marshall Of Sangaree (1968)
- G-711 NA Rona Shambrook (as Rona Randall) Nurse Stacey Comes Aboard (1968)
- G-712 SF William A. P. White (as Anthony Boucher) and J. Francis Mccomas (eds.) The Best From Fantasy and Science Fiction, Third Series
- G-713 SF William A. P. White (as Anthony Boucher) (ed.) The Best From F & Sf Fourth Series (1968)
- G-714 SF William A. P. White (as Anthony Boucher) (ed.) The Best From F & Sf Fifth Series (1968)
- G-715 SF William A. P. White (as Anthony Boucher) (ed.) The Best From Fantasy And Science Fiction, Sixth Series (1968)
- G-716 SF Andre Norton Web Of The Witch World
- G-717 SF Andre Norton Daybreak - 2250 A.D. (1968)
- G-718 SF Philip K. Dick Solar Lottery (1968)
- G-719 SF Neil R. Jones Doomday On Ajiat: Professor Jameson Space Adventure #5 (1968)
- G-720 WE Brian Garfield (as Brian Wynne) Brand of the Gun (1968)
- G-721 WE Don P. Jenison The Silver Concho / Lee Hoffman Dead Man's Gold (1968)
- G-722 NA Gail Everett My Favorite Nurse (1968)
- G-723 SF Andre Norton Star Hunter & Voodoo Planet (1968)
- G-724 SF Philip José Farmer A Private Cosmos (1968)
- G-725 NA William Johnston The Littlest Rebels: The Flying Nun #2 (1968)
- G-726 WE Lee Hoffman The Valdez Horses (1968)
- G-727 WE John Callahan Tracks Of The Hunter / Clay Ringold Return To Rio Fuego (1968)
- G-728 SF Donald A. Wollheim (as David Grinnell)Across Time (1968)
- G-729 NA David McDaniel The Man From U.N.C.L.E. Number 15: The Utopia Affair (1968)
- G-730 SF Alan E. Nourse Psi High And Others (1968)
- G-731 WE Nelson C. Nye A Lost Mine Named Shelton (1968)
- G-732 WE Reese Sullivan The Trouble Borrower / Dwight Bennett Newton (as Clement Hardin) Ambush Reckoning (1968)
- G-733 SF Edgar Rice Burroughs At The Earth's Core (1968)
- G-734 SF Edgar Rice Burroughs Pellucidar (1968)
- G-735 SF Edgar Rice Burroughs Tanar Of Pellucidar (1968)
- G-736 SF Edgar Rice Burroughs Tarzan At The Earth's Core (1968)
- G-737 SF Edgar Rice Burroughs Back To The Stone Age (1968)
- G-738 SF Edgar Rice Burroughs Land Of Terror (1968)
- G-739 SF Edgar Rice Burroughs Savage Pellucidar (1968)
- G-740 SF Fred Saberhagen The Broken Lands (1968)
- G-741 WE Wayne D. Overholser and Lewis B. Patten (jointly as Dean Owen) Red Is The Valley (1968)
- G-742 WE Tom West Write His Name In Gunsmoke / Dean Owens Lone Star Roundup (1968)
- G-743 NA Sharon Heath Nurse On Castle Island (1968)
- G-744 NA Eula Atwood Morrison (as Andrea Delmonico) Chateau Chaumand (1968)
- G-745 SF Edgar Rice Burroughs The Moon Maid (1968)
- G-746 WE William Colt Macdonald Marked Deck At Topango Wells (1968)
- G-747 WE Ray Hogan Killer On The Warbucket / Dean Owen Sage Tower (1968)
- G-748 SF Edgar Rice Burroughs The Moon Men (1968)
- G-749 NA John Sawyer and Nancy Buckingham Sawyer (as Nancy Buckingham) Call Of Glengarron (1968)
- G-750 NA Arlene Hale Dr. Barry's Nurse (1968)
- G-751 NA Mildred Davies The Dark Place (1968)
- G-752 NA Peter Leslie The Man From U.N.C.L.E. Number 16: The Splintered Sunglasses Affair (1968)
- G-753 SF Alan Garner The Moon Of Gomrath (1968)
- G-754 WE Jack L. Bickham The War On Charity Ross (1968)
- G-755 WE Wayne C. Lee Trail Of The Skulls / Merle Constiner The Four From Gila Bend (1968)
- G-756 SF Alexei Panshin Star Well (1968)
- G-757 NA Helen Arvonen Remember With Tears (1968)
- G-758 SF Thomas Burnett Swann Moondust (1968)
- G-759 WE Giff Cheshire Wenatchee Bend (1968)
- G-760 WE Reese Sullivan The Vengeance Ghost / X.X. Jones Bronc (1968)
- G-761 SF John Brunner Catch A Falling Star (1968)
- G-762 SF Alexei Panshin The Thurb Revolution (1968)
- G-763 WE John Shelley and David Shelley Hell-For-Leather Jones (1968)
- G-764 WE Louis Trimble West To The Pecos / John Callahan Jernigan Jernigan (1968)
- G-765 NA Virginia Smiley Nurse Kate's Mercy Flight (1968)
- G-766 SF Edmond Hamilton World Of The Starwolves: Starwolf #3 (1968)
