= List of Ace SF letter-series single titles =

List of science fiction books

Ace Books have published hundreds of science fiction titles, starting in 1953. Many of these were Ace Doubles (dos-a-dos format), but they also published many single volumes. Between 1953 and 1968, the books had a letter-series identifier; after that date they were given five-digit numeric serial numbers. There were a total of 378 letter-series sf titles (62 S&D, 174 F, 19 M, 78 G, 29 H, 1 N, 1 K, and 14 A series books).

The list given here gives a date of publication; in all cases this refers to the date of publication by Ace, and not the date of original publication of the novels. For more information about the history of these titles, see Ace Books, which includes a discussion of the serial numbering conventions used and an explanation of the letter-code system.

== D and S Series ==
- S-066 SF L. Ron Hubbard Return to Tomorrow (1954)
- S-090 SF Robert Moore Williams The Chaos Fighters (1955)
- D-073 SF Donald A. Wollheim Tales of Outer Space (special edition – half of the Ace Double with same code – 1954)
- D-096 SF Andre Norton The Last Planet (special edition – half of the Ace Double with same code – 1955)
- D-099 SF Leigh Bracket The Galactic Breed (special edition – half of the Ace Double with same code – 1955)
- D-110 SF Isaac Asimov The 1,000 Year Plan (special edition – half of the Ace Double with same code – 1955)
- D-121 SF Andre Norton The Stars Are Ours! (special edition – half of the Ace Double with same code – 1955)
- D-125 SF Isaac Asimov The Man Who Upset the Universe (1955)
- S-133 SF Donald A. Wollheim (Ed.) Adventures On Other Planets
- D-146 SF Murray Leinster The Forgotten Planet (special edition – half of the Ace Double with same code – 1956)
- D-150 SF Philip K. Dick Agent of the Unknown (special edition – half of the Ace Double with same code – 1956)
- D-155 SF Jules Verne A Journey To The Center Of The Earth (1956)
- D-169 SF Jack Williamson And James E. Gunn Star Bridge
- S-183 SF Donald A. Wollheim (Ed.) The End of the World
- D-187 SF A. E. van Vogt The Pawns of Null-A
- D-205 SF Lan Wright Who Speaks of Conquest? (special edition – half of the Ace Double with same code – 1957)
- D-211 SF Philip K. Dick Eye in the Sky (1957)
- D-227 SF Cyril Judd "Gunner Cade" (special edition – half of the Ace Double with same code – 1957)
- D-233 SF Rex Gordon First on Mars
- D-245 SF Jules Verne Off on a Comet (1957)
- D-261 SF Philip K. Dick The Variable Man And Other Stories (1957)
- D-274 SF Charles Eric Maine World Without Men (1958)
- D-283 SF Clifford D. Simak City (1958)
- D-309 SF H. G. Wells The Island Of Dr. Moreau (1958)
- D-315 SF Eric Frank Russell "The Space Willies" (special edition – half of the Ace Double with same code – 1958)
- D-322 SF Robert Moore Williams "The Void Beyond" (special edition – half of the Ace Double with same code – 1958)
- D-324 SF Ray Cummings Brigands of the Moon (1958)
- D-327 SF Jefferson Howard Sutton First on the Moon
- D-339 SF Clifford D. Simak Ring Around the Sun
- D-340 SF Philip K. Dick Solar Lottery (1959)
- D-345 SF Andrew North Voodoo Planet (special edition – half of the Ace Double with same code – 1959)
- D-350 SF Peter George (as Peter Bryant) Red Alert
- D-354 SF Donald A. Wollheim (ed.) The Hidden Planet: Science-Fiction Adventures On Venus (1959)
- D-362 SF David Grinell Edge of Time (special edition – half of the Ace Double with same code – 1958)
- D-366 SF Alan E. Nourse and J. A. Meyer The Invaders Are Coming
- D-369 SF Bryan W. Aldiss Vanguard from Alpha (special edition – half of the Ace Double with same code – 1959)
- D-375 SF Damon Knight Masters of Evolution (special edition – half of the Ace Double with same code – 1959)
- D-377 SF Jefferson Howard Sutton Bombs in Orbit (1959)
- D-381 SF Andre Norton Secret of the Lost Race (special edition – half of the Ace Double with same code – 1959)
- D-385 SF Alan E. Nourse Rocket to Limbo (special edition – half of the Ace Double with same code – 1959)
- D-388 SF H. G. Wells When the Sleeper Wakes (1959)
- D-391 SF John Brunner The World Swappers (special edition – half of the Ace Double with same code – 1959)
- D-397 SF Jules Verne Journey to the Center of the Earth
- D-403 SF Murray Leinster The Mutant Weapon (special edition – half of the Ace Double with same code – 1959)
- D-405 SF Rex Gordon First to the Stars
- D-407 SF Robert Silverberg "The Planet Killers" (special edition – half of the Ace Double with same code – 1960)
- D-413 SF Harlan Ellison Man with Nine Lives (special edition – half of the Ace Double with same code – 1955)
- D-421 SF Philip K. Dick Slavers of Space (special edition – half of the Ace Double with same code – 1960)
- D-422 SF Anthony Boucher and J. Francis Mccomas (eds.) The Best From F & SF, 3rd Series
- D-427 SF Robert Moore Williams To the End of Time (special edition – half of the Ace Double with same code – 1960)
- D-434 SF Jules Verne The Purchase of the North Pole (1960)
- D-449 SF Gardon R. Dickson Time to Teleport (special edition – half of the Ace Double with same code – 1960)
- D-453 SF Margaret St. Clair The Games of Neith (special edition – half of the Ace Double with same code – 1960)
- D-455 SF Anthony Boucher (Ed.) The Best From Fantasy And Science Fiction, 4th Series (1960)
- D-461 SF Andre Norton The Time Traders (1960)
- D-468 SF Eric Frank Russell Sentinel of Space (1960)
- D-473 SF Eric Temple Bell (As John Taine) The Greatest Adventure
- D-478 SF Jefferson Howard Sutton Spacehive (1960)
- D-482 SF A. E. van Vogt The Weapon Shops of Isher (1961)
- D-490 SF Donald A. Wollheim (Ed.) Adventures on Other Planets (1961)
- D-498 SF Andre Norton Galactic Derelict (1961)
- D-504 SF Jules Verne Master of the World (1961)
- D-516 SF Otis Adelbert Kline The Swordsman Of Mars (1961)
- D-525 SF Murray Leinster This World Is Taboo (1961)
- D-527 SF Andre Norton Star Guard (1961)
- D-528 SF Murray Leinster The Forgotten Planet
- D-530 SF Robert Moore Williams The Day They H-Bombed Los Angeles (1961)
- D-531 SF Otis Adelbert Kline The Outlaws of Mars
- D-534 SF Andre Norton Daybreak - 2250 A. D. (1961)
- D-535 SF Ray Cummings The Shadow Girl (1962)
- D-537 SF H. G. Wells The Island of Dr. Moreau (1961)
- D-538 SF Isaac Asimov The 1,000 Year Plan (1961)
- D-541 SF Alan E. Nourse Scavengers in Space (1962)
- D-542 SF Andre Norton The Last Planet (1962)
- D-544 SF Frank Belknap Long Space Station #1 (1962)
- D-546 SF Andre Norton The Crossroads of Time
- D-547 SF John Brunner The Super Barbarians (1962)
- D-548 SF Dean Owen The End of the World (1962)
- D-550 SF Poul Anderson No World of Their Own (1962)
- D-551 SF Peter George (as Peter Bryant) Red Alert
- D-553 SF William Hope Hodgson The House On The Borderland (1962)
- D-555 SF Jack Williamson The Trial of Terra (1962)
- D-568 SF Poul Anderson Star Ways (1962)

== F Series ==
- F-105 SF Anthony Boucher (ed.) The Best From Fantasy And Science Fiction, Fifth Series
- F-109 SF Andre Norton Storm Over Warlock (1961)
- F-114 SF Wallace West The Bird of Time (1961)
- F-131 SF Anthony Boucher (ed.) The Best From Fantasy And Science Fiction, Sixth Series
- F-133 SF A. Bertram Chandler The Rim of Space (special edition – half of the Ace Double with same code – 1961)
- F-135 SF Leigh Brackett The Long Tomorrow (1962)
- F-154 SF A. E. van Vogt The Wizard of Linn (1962)
- F-156 SF Edgar Rice Burroughs At The Earth's Core (1962)
- F-157 SF Edgar Rice Burroughs The Moon Maid (1962)
- F-158 SF Edgar Rice Burroughs Pellucidar (1962)
- F-159 SF Edgar Rice Burroughs The Moon Men (1962)
- F-162 SF Anthony Boucher (ed.) The Best From Fantasy And Science Fiction, Seventh Series (1962)
- F-167 SF Andre Norton Catseye (1962)
- F-168 SF Edgar Rice Burroughs Thuvia, Maid of Mars (1962)
- F-169 SF Edgar Rice Burroughs Tarzan and the Lost Empire (1962)
- F-170 SF Edgar Rice Burroughs The Chessmen of Mars (1962)
- F-171 SF Edgar Rice Burroughs Tanar Of Pellucidar (1962)
- F-174 SF Rex Gordon First Through Time (1962)
- F-178 SF Donald A. Wollheim (ed.) More Adventures On Other Planets (1963)
- F-179 SF Edgar Rice Burroughs Pirates of Venus (1963)
- F-180 SF Edgar Rice Burroughs Tarzan at the Earth's Core (1963)
- F-181 SF Edgar Rice Burroughs The Master Mind of Mars (1963)
- F-182 SF Edgar Rice Burroughs The Monster Men (1963)
- F-183 SF Andre Norton The Defiant Agents (1963)
- F-188 SF Philip Francis Nowlan Armageddon 2419 A.D. (1962)
- F-189 SF Edgar Rice Burroughs Tarzan the Invincible (1963)
- F-190 SF Edgar Rice Burroughs A Fighting Man of Mars (1963)
- F-191 SF Jules Verne Journey to the Center of the Earth (1963)
- F-192 SF Andre Norton Star Born (1963)
- F-193 SF Edgar Rice Burroughs The Son of Tarzan (1963)
- F-194 SF Edgar Rice Burroughs Tarzan Triumphant (1963)
- F-197 SF Andre Norton Witch World (1963)
- F-201 SF Paul MacTyre Doomsday, 1999 (1963)
- F-203 SF Edgar Rice Burroughs The Beasts of Tarzan
- F-204 SF Edgar Rice Burroughs Tarzan and the Jewels of Opar (1963)
- F-205 SF Edgar Rice Burroughs Tarzan and the City of Gold (1963)
- F-206 SF Edgar Rice Burroughs Jungle Tales of Tarzan (1963)
- F-207 SF Andre Norton The Stars Are Ours!
- F-210 SF Peter George (as Peter Bryant) Red Alert
- F-211 SF Otis Adelbert Kline Planet of Peril (1963)
- F-212 SF Edgar Rice Burroughs Tarzan and the Lion Man
- F-213 SF Edgar Rice Burroughs The Land That Time Forgot (1963)
- F-216 SF Isaac Asimov The Man Who Upset the Universe (1963)
- F-217 SF Anthony Boucher (ed.) The Best From Fantasy And Science Fiction, Eighth Series (1963)
- F-220 SF Edgar Rice Burroughs The People That Time Forgot (1963)
- F-221 SF Edgar Rice Burroughs Lost on Venus (1963)
- F-222 SF Jefferson Howard Sutton First on the Moon (1963)
- F-225 SF H. Beam Piper Space Viking (1963)
- F-226 SF Andre Norton Huon of the Horn (1963)
- F-231 SF Andre Norton Star Gate (1963)
- F-232 SF Edgar Rice Burroughs The Land of Hidden Men (1963)
- F-233 SF Edgar Rice Burroughs Out of Time's Abyss (1963)
- F-234 SF Edgar Rice Burroughs The Eternal Savage (1963)
- F-235 SF Edgar Rice Burroughs The Lost Continent (1963)
- F-236 SF Andre Norton The Time Traders
- F-239 SF Clifford D. Simak Time And Again (1963)
- F-240 SF H. G. Wells When the Sleeper Wakes (1963)
- F-241 SF Jack Williamson and James E. Gunn Star Bridge (1963)
- F-243 SF Andre Norton Lord Of Thunder (1963)
- F-245 SF Edgar Rice Burroughs Back to the Stone Age (1963)
- F-246 SF Thea von Harbou Metropolis (1963)
- F-247 SF Edgar Rice Burroughs Carson of Venus (1963)
- F-248 SF Ray Cummings Beyond the Stars (1963)
- F-251 SF Philip K. Dick The Game-Players of Titan (1963)
- F-255 SF Philip E. High The Prodigal Sun (1964)
- F-256 SF Edgar Rice Burroughs Land Of Terror (1964)
- F-257 SF Fletcher Pratt Alien Planet (1964)
- F-258 SF Edgar Rice Burroughs The Cave Girl (1964)
- F-259 SF Otis Adelbert Kline Prince Of Peril (1964)
- F-263 SF Andre Norton Web Of The Witch World (1964)
- F-267 SF Robert P. Mills (ed.) The Best From Fantasy And Science Fiction, 9th Series (1964)
- F-268 SF Edgar Rice Burroughs Escape on Venus (1964)
- F-269 SF J. H. Rosny Quest of the Dawn Man (1964)
- F-270 SF Edgar Rice Burroughs The Mad King (1964)
- F-271 SF Edmond Hamilton Outside the Universe (1964)
- F-274 SF H. Beam Piper The Cosmic Computer (1964)
- F-277 SF John Brunner To Conquer Chaos (1964)
- F-279 SF Andre Norton (as Andrew North) Sargasso of Space
- F-280 SF Edgar Rice Burroughs Savage Pellucidar (1964)
- F-281 SF Pierre Benoit Atlantida (1964)
- F-282 SF Edgar Rice Burroughs Beyond The Farthest Star (1964)
- F-283 SF Sax Rohmer The Day the World Ended (1964)
- F-287 SF Andre Norton The Key Out of Time (1964)
- F-291 SF Andre Norton Plague Ship (1964)
- F-293 SF E. C. Tubb Moonbase (1964)
- F-294 SF Otis Adelbert Kline The Port of Peril (1964)
- F-295 SF A. E. van Vogt The World of Null-A
- F-296 SF Edwin L. Arnold Gulliver of Mars (1964)
- F-297 SF Henry Kuttner The Valley of the Flame (1964)
- F-301 SF Philip K. Dick The Simulacra (1964)
- F-303 SF Marion Zimmer Bradley The Bloody Sun
- F-304 SF Ralph Milne Farley The Radio Beasts (1964)
- F-305 SF Robert E. Howard Almuric (1964)
- F-306 SF C. L. Moore and Henry Kuttner Earth's Last Citadel (1964)
- F-307 SF Gardner F. Fox Warrior of Llarn (1964)
- F-308 SF Andre Norton Judgment on Janus (1964)
- F-309 SF Philip K. Dick Clans of the Alphane Moon (1964)
- F-310 SF Andre Norton Galactic Derelict (1964)
- F-311 SF Donald A. Wollheim (ed.) Swordsmen in the Sky (1964)
- F-312 SF Ralph Milne Farley The Radio Planet
- F-313 SF Ray Cummings A Brand New World (1964)
- F-314 SF James H. Schmitz The Universe Against Her (1964)
- F-315 SF Andre Norton The Beast Master
- F-317 SF James White The Escape Orbit (1965)
- F-318 SF Austin Hall The Spot Of Life (1965)
- F-319 SF Edmond Hamilton Crashing Suns (1965)
- F-320 SF John Brunner (as Keith Woodcott) The Martian Sphinx (1965)
- F-321 SF Otis Adelbert Kline Maza of the Moon (1965)
- F-322 SF Samuel R. Delany City of a Thousand Suns (1965)
- F-323 SF Andre Norton Daybreak - 2250 A.D.
- F-325 SF Andre Norton Ordeal in Otherwhere (1965)
- F-326 SF Lin Carter The Wizard of Lemuria (1965)
- F-327 SF Henry Kuttner The Dark World (1965)
- F-328 SF Edward E. Smith The Galaxy Primes (1965)
- F-329 SF Andre Norton Storm Over Warlock (1965)
- F-330 SF Avram Davidson What Strange Stars and Skies (1965)
- F-332 SF Andre Norton Three Against the Witch World (1965)
- F-333 SF L. Sprague de Camp Rogue Queen (1965)
- F-334 SF Rex Dean Levie The Insect Warriors (1965)
- F-335 SF Robert Moore Williams The Second Atlantis (1965)
- F-337 SF Philip K. Dick Dr. Bloodmoney, or How We Got Along After the Bomb (1965)
- F-342 SF H. Beam Piper Lord Kalvan of Otherwhen (1965)
- F-343 SF Ray Cummings The Exile of Time (1965)
- F-344 SF Henry Kuttner The Well of the Worlds (1965)
- F-345 SF Homer Eon Flint The Lord of Death and the Queen of Life (1965)
- F-346 SF John W. Campbell, Jr. The Black Star Passes (1965)
- F-347 SF Ian Wright The Last Hope of Earth (1965)
- F-350 SF Marion Zimmer Bradley Star Of Danger (1965)
- F-353 SF Avram Davidson Rogue Dragon (1965)
- F-354 SF Gardner F. Fox The Hunter Out Of Time (1965)
- F-355 SF Homer Eon Flint The Devolutionist and The Emancipatrix (1965)
- F-356 SF Henry Kuttner The Time Axis (1965)
- F-357 SF Andre Norton Year of the Unicorn (1965)
- F-361 SF John Brunner The Day of the Star Cities (1965)
- F-363 SF Ray Cummings Tama of the Light Country (1965)
- F-364 SF John W. Campbell, Jr. The Mightiest Machine (1965)
- F-365 SF Andre Norton Night of Masks (1966)
- F-366 SF Andre Norton The Last Planet
- F-367 SF Philip José Farmer The Maker of Universes (1965)
- F-372 SF Edward E. Smith Spacehounds of IPC (1966)
- F-373 SF Howard L. Cory The Sword of Lankor (1966)
- F-374 SF Jefferson Howard Sutton The Atom Conspiracy (1966)
- F-375 SF Robert A. Heinlein The Worlds of Robert A. Heinlein (1966)
- F-377 SF Philip K. Dick The Crack In Space (1966)
- F-379 SF Frank Herbert The Green Brain (1966)
- F-382 SF Brian W. Aldiss Bow Down To Nul (1966)
- F-383 SF Lin Carter Thongor of Lemuria (1966)
- F-386 SF Andre Norton The Time Traders (1966)
- F-388 SF Samuel R. Delany Babel-17 (1966)
- F-390 SF Jack Vance The Languages of Pao (1966)
- F-391 SF Andre Norton The Crossroads of Time (1966)
- F-392 SF Emil Petaja Saga Of Lost Earths (1966)
- F-393 SF Roger Zelazny This Immortal (1966)
- F-396 SF Kenneth Bulmer Worlds for the Taking (1966)
- F-398 SF Eric Frank Russell Somewhere a Voice (1966)
- F-399 SF Gardner F. Fox Thief of Llarn (1966)
- F-400 SF Otis Adelbert Kline Jan of the Jungle (1966)
- F-402 SF Cordwainer Smith Quest of the Three Worlds (1966)
- F-403 SF Roger Zelazny The Dream Master (1966)
- F-406 SF Ray Cummings Tama, Princess Of Mercury (1966)
- F-407 SF Thomas Burnett Swann Day Of The Minotaur (1966)
- F-408 SF Andre Norton The Sioux Spaceman (1966)
- F-412 SF Philip José Farmer The Gates of Creation (1966)
- F-414 SF Emil Petaja The Star Mill (1966)
- F-416 SF Rex Gordon Utopia Minus X (1966)
- F-420 SF Neil R. Jones Professor Jameson Space Adventure 1: The Planet Of The Double Sun (1967)
- F-421 SF Donald E. Westlake (as Curt Clark) Anarchaos (1967)
- F-422 SF Leigh Brackett The Sword of Rhiannon (1967)
- F-425 SF Poul Anderson World Without Stars (1967)
- F-426 SF Gordon R. Dickson The Genetic General (1967)
- F-427 SF Samuel R. Delany The Einstein Intersection (1967)
- F-429 SF Philip K. Dick The World Jones Made (1967)

== M Series ==
- M-116 SF Robert P. Mills (ed.) The Best From Fantasy And Science Fiction, Tenth Series
- M-119 SF Jules Verne Journey to the Center of the Earth (1965)
- M-132 SF Robert W. Chambers The King in Yellow (1965)
- M-137 SF Robert P. Mills (ed.) The Best From Fantasy And Science Fiction, Eleventh Series (1966)
- M-142 SF H.F. Heard Doppelgangers (1966)
- M-143 SF John W. Campbell Islands of Space (1965)
- M-147 SF Andre Norton The Stars Are Ours!
- M-148 SF Andre Norton Star Born (1966)
- M-149 SF Jack Vance The Eyes of the Overworld (1966)
- M-150 SF Andre Norton The Defiant Agents
- M-151 SF Andre Norton The Last Planet
- M-152 SF H. Warner Munn King Of The World's Edge (1966)
- M-153 SF A. E. van Vogt The Weapon Makers (1966)
- M-154 SF John W. Campbell Invaders from the Infinite (1966)
- M-155 SF Roger Zelazny Four For Tomorrow (1966)
- M-156 SF Andre Norton Key Out Of Time (1966)
- M-157 SF Andre Norton Star Gate (1966)
- M-162 SF Donald A. Wollheim (as David Grinnell) Edge Of Time (1966)
- M-165 SF Keith Laumer Worlds Of The Imperium (1966)

== G Series ==
- G-547 SF Austin Hall and Homer Eon Flint The Blind Spot (1965)
- G-551 SF Donald A. Wollheim and Terry Carr (eds.) World's Best Science Fiction: 1965 (1965)
- G-570 SF Alan Garner The Weirdstone Of Brisingamen (1965)
- G-582 SF Jules Verne Journey to the Center of the Earth (1966)
- G-586 SF William L. Chester Hawk of the Wilderness (1966)
- G-595 SF Andre Norton Quest Crosstime (1966)
- G-599 SF Andre Norton Star Guard (1966)
- G-605 SF Larry Maddock The Flying Saucer Gambit - Agent Of T.E.R.R.A. #1 (1966)
- G-611 SF Avram Davidson (ed.) The Best From Fantasy And Science Fiction, Twelfth Series (1967)
- G-620 SF Larry Maddock The Golden Goddess Gambit - Agent Of T.E.R.R.A. #2 (1967)
- G-625 SF Kenneth Bulmer To Outrun Doomsday (1967)
- G-626 SF Ursula K. Le Guin City Of Illusions (1967)
- G-627 SF Fritz Leiber The Big Time (1967)
- G-630 SF Andre Norton Warlock of the Witch World (1967)
- G-631 SF Neil R. Jones The Sunless World: Professor Jameson Space Adventure #2 (1967)
- G-634 SF Poul Anderson War of the Wing-Men (1967)
- G-637 SF Philip K. Dick and Ray Nelson The Ganymede Takeover (1967)
- G-639 SF Edmond Hamilton The Weapon from Beyond: Starwolf Series #1 (1967)
- G-640 SF Thomas Burnett Swann The Weirwoods (1967)
- G-641 SF Jack Williamson Bright New Universe (1967)
- G-644 SF Larry Maddock The Emerald Elephant Gambit: Agent Of T.E.R.R.A. #3
- G-646 SF Andre Norton The X Factor (1967)
- G-647 SF Murray Leinster S.O.S. From Three Worlds (1967)
- G-649 SF John Brunner The World Swappers (1967)
- G-650 SF Neil R. Jones Space War: Professor Jameson Space Adventure #3
- G-654 SF Andre Norton Catseye (1967)
- G-655 SF Andre Norton Witch World (1967)
- G-656 SF John Jakes When the Star Kings Die (1967)
- G-660 SF A. E. van Vogt The Universe Maker (1967)
- G-661 SF Jack Vance Big Planet (1967)
- G-664 SF John Brunner Born Under Mars (1967)
- G-667 SF David McDaniel The Arsenal Out Of Time (1967)
- G-669 SF Leigh Brackett The Coming Of The Terrans (1967)
- G-673 SF Mark S. Geston Lords of the Starship
- G-675 SF James White The Secret Visitors (1967)
- G-677 SF Damon Knight Turning On: Thirteen Stories (1967)
- G-680 SF Kenneth Bulmer Cycle of Nemesis (1967)
- G-681 SF Neil R. Jones Twin Worlds: Professor Jameson Space Adventure #4 (1967)
- G-683 SF Leigh Brackett The Big Jump (1967)
- G-688 SF Jack Vance City Of The Chasch: Planet Of Adventure #1 (1968)
- G-690 SF Andre Norton The Beast Master (1968)
- G-691 SF Andre Norton Lord of Thunder
- G-692 SF Otis Adelbert Kline The Swordsman Of Mars (1968)
- G-693 SF Otis Adelbert Kline The Outlaws Of Mars (1968)
- G-694 SF Thomas Burnett Swann The Dolphin And The Deep (1968)
- G-697 SF Poul Anderson We Claim These Stars (1968)
- G-701 SF Edmond Hamilton The Closed Worlds: Starwolf #2 (1968)
- G-703 SF Andre Norton Victory On Janus (1968)
- G-706 SF Samuel R. Delany The Jewels Of Aptor (1968)
- G-709 SF John Brunner Bedlam Planet (1968)
- G-712 SF Anthony Boucher and J. Francis Mccomas (eds.) The Best From Fantasy and Science Fiction, Third Series
- G-713 SF Anthony Boucher (ed.) The Best From F & Sf Fourth Series (1968)
- G-714 SF Anthony Boucher (ed.) The Best From F & Sf Fifth Series (1968)
- G-715 SF Anthony Boucher (ed.) The Best From Fantasy And Science Fiction, Sixth Series (1968)
- G-716 SF Andre Norton Web Of The Witch World
- G-717 SF Andre Norton Daybreak - 2250 A.D. (1968)
- G-718 SF Philip K. Dick Solar Lottery (1968)
- G-719 SF Neil R. Jones Doomday on Ajiat: Professor Jameson Space Adventure #5 (1968)
- G-723 SF Andre Norton Star Hunter & Voodoo Planet (1968)
- G-724 SF Philip José Farmer A Private Cosmos (1968)
- G-728 SF Donald A. Wollheim (as David Grinnell)Across Time (1968)
- G-730 SF Alan E. Nourse Psi High And Others (1968)
- G-733 SF Edgar Rice Burroughs At the Earth's Core (1968)
- G-734 SF Edgar Rice Burroughs Pellucidar (1968)
- G-735 SF Edgar Rice Burroughs Tanar Of Pellucidar (1968)
- G-736 SF Edgar Rice Burroughs Tarzan At The Earth's Core (1968)
- G-737 SF Edgar Rice Burroughs Back to the Stone Age (1968)
- G-738 SF Edgar Rice Burroughs Land of Terror (1968)
- G-739 SF Edgar Rice Burroughs Savage Pellucidar (1968)
- G-740 SF Fred Saberhagen The Broken Lands (1968)
- G-745 SF Edgar Rice Burroughs The Moon Maid (1968)
- G-748 SF Edgar Rice Burroughs The Moon Men (1968)
- G-753 SF Alan Garner The Moon of Gomrath (1968)
- G-756 SF Alexei Panshin Star Well (1968)
- G-758 SF Thomas Burnett Swann Moondust (1968)
- G-761 SF John Brunner Catch A Falling Star (1968)
- G-762 SF Alexei Panshin The Thurb Revolution (1968)
- G-766 SF Edmond Hamilton World of the Starwolves: Starwolf #3 (1968)

== H Series ==
- H-15 SF Donald A. Wollheim and Terry Carr (eds.) The World's Best Science Fiction (1966)
- H-18 SF Jefferson Howard Sutton H-Bomb Over America (1966)
- H-19 SF Frederik Pohl (ed.) The If Reader of Science Fiction (1966)
- H-26 SF Avram Davidson (ed.) The Best From Fantasy And Science Fiction, 13th Series (1967)
- H-30 SF Clifford D. Simak City (1967)
- H-33 SF Andre Norton Moon of Three Rings (1967)
- H-38 SF Fritz Leiber The Swords of Lankhmar (1968)
- H-39 SF Philip K. Dick Eye in the Sky (1968)
- H-41 SF Jules Verne Into The Niger Bend (1968)
- H-42 SF Clifford D. Simak Why Call Them Back From Heaven? (1968)
- H-43 SF Jules Verne The City in the Sahara (1968)
- H-49 SF Jules Verne The Begum's Fortune (1968)
- H-52 SF Jules Verne Yesterday and Tomorrow (1968)
- H-54 SF R. A. Lafferty Past Master (1968)
- H-58 SF Gertrude Friedberg The Revolving Boy (1968)
- H-60 SF Jules Verne Carpathian Castle (1968)
- H-62 SF Wilson Tucker The Lincoln Hunters (1968)
- H-67 SF Jules Verne The Village in the Treetops (1968)
- H-72 SF Joanna Russ Picnic on Paradise (1968)
- H-73 SF Fritz Leiber Swords Against Wizardy (1968)
- H-78 SF Jules Verne The Hunt for the Meteor (1968)
- H-79 SF Bob Shaw The Two-Timers (1968)
- H-84 SF Andre Norton Sorceress of the Witch World (1968)
- H-86 SF D. G. Compton Synthajoy (1968)
- H-89 SF John Macklin Dimensions Beyond The Unknown
- H-90 SF Fritz Leiber Swords in the Mist (1968)
- H-92 SF A. E. van Vogt The Far-Out Worlds of A. E. van Vogt (1968)
- H-102 SF Edward E. Smith Subspace Explorers (1968)
- H-105 SF James H. Schmitz The Demon Breed (1968)

== K Series ==
- K-154 SF George R. Stewart Earth Abides (1962)

== A Series ==
Ace Books published its A series of books from about 1966 to 1968, priced at 75 cents.

- A-3 SF Bernard Wolfe Limbo (1966)
- A-4 SF J. R. R. Tolkien The Fellowship of the Ring (1966)
- A-5 SF J. R. R. Tolkien The Two Towers (1966)
- A-6 SF J. R. R. Tolkien The Return of the King (1966)
- A-8 SF John Myers Myers Silverlock (1966)
- A-10 SF Terry Carr and Donald A. Wollheim (eds.) The World's Best SF: 1967 (1967)
- A-12 SF Terry Carr (ed.) New Worlds of Fantasy (1967)
- A-13 SF James H. Schmitz The Witches of Karres (1968)
- A-15 SF Terry Carr and Donald A. Wollheim (eds.) World's Best SF: 1968 (1968)
- A-16 SF Alexei Panshin Rite of Passage (1968)
- A-17 SF Avram Davidson (ed.) The Best From Fantasy & Science Fiction, 14th Series (1968)
- A-19 SF Piers Anthony and Robert E. Margroff The Ring (1968)
- A-25 SF Edgar Rice Burroughs The Outlaw of Torn (1968)
- A-29 SF James Blish and Norman L. Knight A Torrent of Faces (1968)

== N Series ==
- N-3 SF Frank Herbert Dune (1966)
