= In Search of Wonder =

1956 collection of critical essays by Damon Knight

- First edition cover
- Author: Damon Knight
- Illustrator: J. L. Patterson
- Language: English
- Genre: Science fiction Literary criticism
- Publisher: Advent
- Publication date: 1956
- Publication place: United States
- Media type: Print (Hardback)
- Pages: 180
- ISBN: 978-0-911682-31-1

In Search of Wonder: Essays on Modern Science Fiction is a collection of critical essays by American writer Damon Knight. Most of the material in the original version of the book was originally published between 1952 and 1955 in various science fiction magazines including Infinity Science Fiction, Original SF Stories, and Future SF. The essays were highly influential, and contributed to Knight's stature as the foremost critic of science fiction of his generation. The book also constitutes an informal record of the "Boom Years" of science fiction from 1950 to 1955.

In the opening chapter, Knight states his "credos", two of which are:

That science fiction is a field of literature worth taking seriously, and that ordinary critical standards can be meaningfully applied to it: e.g., originality, sincerity, style, construction, logic, coherence, sanity, garden-variety grammar. That a bad book hurts science fiction more than ten bad notices.

One essay in the book is "Cosmic Jerrybuilder: A. E. van Vogt", a review of the 1945 magazine serialization of A. E. van Vogt's The World of Null-A, in which Knight "exposed the profound irrationality lying at the heart of much traditional science fiction".

In 1956 Knight was awarded a Hugo as "Best Book Reviewer" based largely on the essays reprinted in this book.

== Publishing history ==
In Search of Wonder was originally issued by Advent:Publishers in hardcover in 1956. Advent reissued it in both hardcover and trade paperback in 1960. The second, expanded, edition was published by Advent in hardcover in 1967, with trade paperback reprints following in 1968 and 1974. The second edition was more than 120 pages longer and included six added chapters. Advent published a third, further expanded edition, nearly 100 pages longer than the second edition, in 1996. The third edition adds roughly 30,000 words of text and augments the bibliography and index; it incorporates six new chapters and expands Knight's discussion of longtime editor John W. Campbell Jr. Orion released an ebook edition in 2013.

== Quotes ==
On defining science fiction:

- "Science fiction ... means what we point to when we say it." (1st ed., p. 1)

On criticism:

- "Why should anybody rip a bad work of art to shreds? Why, to find out how it is made." (1st ed., p. 14)

On science fiction writers:

- A. E. van Vogt "is no giant; he is a pygmy who has learned to operate an overgrown typewriter." (1st ed., p. 50)
- "[Ray] Bradbury's subject is childhood and the buried child-in-man; his aim is to narrow the focus, not to widen it; to shrink all the big frightening things to the compass of the familiar: a spaceship to a tin can; a Fourth of July rocket to a brass kettle; a lion to a Teddy bear." (1st ed., p. 77)

On science fiction novels:

- I Am Legend by Richard Matheson "is full of good ideas, every other one of which is immediately dropped and kicked out of sight." (1st ed., p. 51)
- "The Blind Spot, by Austin Hall and Homer Eon Flint, is an acknowledged classic of fantasy, first published in 1921; much praised since then, several times reprinted, venerated by connoisseurs - all despite the fact that the book has no recognizable vestige of merit." (1st ed., p. 14)

On publishers:

- "Even Jove nods, and even Ballantine can produce a genuinely bad book. Riders to the Stars, by Curt Siodmak and Robert Smith, is a stinker such as I have seldom had the privilege of seeing: so thoroughly and concentratedly bad in every dimension, joint, hinge, surface and detail that I cannot offhand think of a companion piece for it." (3rd ed., p. 110-111)

On British writers:

- "The only thing worse than a bad American novel is a bad British one." (1st ed., p. 71)

== Contents ==
Following is a list of chapters in the first edition (1956).

Introduction by Anthony Boucher
Author's Note

1. Critics
2. The Classics
3. Chuckleheads
4. Campbell and His Decade
5. Cosmic Jerrybuilder: A. E. van Vogt
6. Half-Bad Writers
7. One Sane Man: Robert A. Heinlein
8. Asimov and Empire
9. More Chuckleheads
10. When I Was in Kneepants: Ray Bradbury
11. The Vorpal Pen: Theodore Sturgeon
12. Anthologies
13. Genius to Order: Kuttner and Moore
14. Kornbluth and the Silver Lexicon
15. The Jagged Blade: James Blish
16. Overalls on Parnassus: Fletcher Pratt
17. Microcosmic Moskowitz
18. New Stars
19. Curiosa
20. The Giants
21. Pitfalls and Dead Ends
22. What next?

Bibliography
Index

The second edition (Advent, 1967) included the additional chapters:

- Half Loaves
- Amphibians
- B-R-R-R!
- Decadents
- Britons
- Symbolism

"Symbolism" is chapter-long essay on the symbolism in James Blish's short story "Common Time", first published in a 1967 issue of Science Fiction Forum.

The third edition, published 1996, interwove additional chapters, including personal reminiscences:

Introduction, by Anthony Boucher
Author's Notes

1. Myself When Young
2. Critics
3. The Classics
4. Chuckleheads
5. Campbell and His Decade
6. Cosmic Jerrybuilder: A. E. van Vogt
7. Half-Bad Writers
8. One Sane Man: Robert A. Heinlein
9. Asimov and Empire
10. More Chuckleheads
11. When I Was in Kneepants: Ray Bradbury
12. The Vorpal Pen: Theodore Sturgeon
13. The Excluded Data: Charles Fort
14. Microcosmic Moskowitz
15. Anthologies
16. Half Loaves
17. Genius to Order: Kuttner and Moore
18. Kornbluth and the Silver Lexicon
19. The Jagged Blade: James Blish
20. Overalls on Parnassus: Fletcher Pratt
21. Amphibians
22. New Stars
23. Curiosa
24. Br-r-r!
25. Decadents
26. Britons
27. Pitfalls and Dead Ends
28. Symbolism
29. Milford and Clarion
30. Science and the World
31. What Is Science Fiction, Anyway?
32. Writing Science Fiction
33. What Next?

Acknowledgements
Bibliography
Index

== Reception ==
Anthony Boucher described the original edition as "a comprehensive picture of the book publication of science fiction in the 1950s, valuable as a historical record, stimulating as a detailed analysis of faults and virtues, and delightful simply as good reading matter in its own right", P. Schuyler Miller reviewed the book favorably, saying that Knight "applies his rules honestly and mercilessly", although he also noted that Knight's close focus on technical aspects of writing sometimes ignored an author's ability to "cast a spell . . . even if the carpentry and design is shoddy".

Reviewing the second edition, Algis Budrys declared that "Damon Knight sets an as yet unequalled standard" for sf criticism, and praised Knight both for "his exact appreciations of the well done" as well as "how influential [he] was when summing up the subtle but suddenly obvious flaws in work that had seemed pretty good". Barry N. Malzberg wrote that "Damon Knight is probably our field's first and best critic and . . . this book is the most important nonfiction ever published in the category".
