= People of the Comet =

Book by Austin Hall

- Dust-jacket from the first edition
- Author: Austin Hall
- Illustrator: R. K. Murphy
- Cover artist: Jack Gaughan
- Language: English
- Genre: Science fiction
- Publisher: Griffin Publishing Company
- Publication date: 1948
- Publication place: United States
- Pages: 131
- OCLC: 6411492

People of the Comet is a science fiction novel by American writer Austin Hall. It was first published in book form in 1948 by Griffin Publishing Company in an edition of 900 copies. The novel was originally serialized in two parts in the magazine Weird Tales beginning in September 1923, as The People of the Comet. The author's own title for the novel was Hop O' My Thumb.

== Plot introduction ==
The novel concerns super-beings who reveal that the Solar System is an atom in a larger universe.

== Publication history ==
- 1923, US, Weird Tales, Pub date September 1923, magazine serialization in 2 parts
- 1948, US, Griffin Publishing Company OCLC 6411492, Pub date 1948, Hardback, first book publication
- 1950, Belgium, comics magazine Bravo, Pub date 23 November 1950, magazine, as La comète rouge. Serial. Digest in French of the original text.
