= Theodora McCormick Du Bois =

American writer (1890–1986)

Theodora Du Bois
- Born: Theodora Brenton Eliot McCormick; 14 September 1890; Brooklyn, New York
- Died: 1 February 1986 (aged 95)
- Occupation: Author
- Writing career
- Genres: Mystery, Romance, Fantasy, Science fiction

Theodora McCormick Du Bois (September 14, 1890 – February 1, 1986) was an American writer of genre fiction, including mysteries, children's literature, historical romances, fantasy and science fiction.

== Early life ==
Theodora Brenton Eliot McCormick was born in Brooklyn, New York, the daughter of Eliot McCormick, a writer and editor, and Laura Case Brenton McCormick. She was raised by her mother and stepfather, Charles MacDonald, after her father's death in 1891. She attended the Barnard School for Girls in Manhattan, and the Halsted School in Yonkers. She was a student in the Dartmouth Summer School for Drama in 1916.

She was accepted to Vassar in 1909, but her parents did not support her attendance. She planned to attend, but was diagnosed with tuberculosis and spent several months in a sanatorium. She wrote a great deal of poetry during her illness, but dedicated herself to prose thereafter.

== Career ==
Theodora McCormick Du Bois was a prolific author of mystery novels as "Theodora Du Bois", and of historical romances as "Theodora McCormick". "Fresh as football weather and as up to date as Radio City, this story has a verve seldom found in the usual run of boarding-house stories," commented the New York Times reviewer Ellen Lewis Buell of McCormick's juvenile novel, Diana's Feathers (1935).

Her fantasy and science fiction novels included The Devil's Spoon (1930), Murder Strikes an Atomic Unit (1946), Solution T-25 (1951) and Sarah Hall's Sea God (1952).

Theodora McCormick also co-wrote a book, Amateur and Educational Dramatics (1917), with Evelyne Hilliard and Kate Oglebay. She published short fiction too, beginning with "Thursday and the King and Queen" (Woman's Home Companion, 1920), and including "Devils and Four Gold Cups" (The Century Magazine, 1921), "Eblis" (Harper's, 1926), "Circe" (The Century Magazine, 1927), "King Solomon or the Iceman" (The Century Magazine, 1927), "A Pirate in the Linen Closet" (The Century Magazine, 1927), "Martyrs in the Ice-Box" (The Century Magazine, 1928).

About half of Du Bois's books featured the characters Jeffrey McNeill, a forensic scientist, and his wife Anne McNeill, who narrates their mystery-solving adventures. Her unflattering depiction of the House Un-American Activities Committee hearings in Seeing Red (1954) caused her publisher, Doubleday, to stop publishing her books.

== Selected works ==
- The Devil's Spoon (1930)
- Diana's Feathers (1935)
- Armed with a New Terror (1936)
- Death Wears a White Coat (1938)
- Death Tears a Comic Strip (1939)
- Death Dines Out (1939)
- Death Comes to Tea (1940)
- Death is Late to Lunch (1941)
- The McNeills Chase a Ghost (1941)
- The Body Goes Round and Round (1942)
- The Wild Duck Murders (1943)
- Banjo the Crow (1943)
- The Case of the Perfumed Mouse (1944)
- Death Sails in a High Wind (1945)
- Murder Strikes an Atomic Unit (1946)
- The Footsteps (1947)
- The Devil and Destiny (1948)
- The Face of Hate (1948)
- Rogue's Coat (1949)
- Its Raining Violence (1949)
- High Tension (1950)
- We Merrily Put to Sea (1950)
- Solution T-25 (1951)
- Fowl Play (1951)
- The Cavalier's Corpse (1952)
- Sarah Hall's Sea God (1952)
- Freedom's Way (1953)
- The Listener (1953)
- Seeing Red (1954)
- The Emerald Crown (1955)
- The Love of Fingin O'Lea (1957)
- Rich Boy-Poor Boy (1961)
- Captive of Rome (1962)
- Tiger Burning Bright (1964)
- Shannon Terror (1964)
- Dangerous Rescue (1964)
- The Late Bride (1964)
- The High King's Daughter (1965)

== Personal life ==
Theodora McCormick moved to Dongan Hills, Staten Island after marrying engineer Delafield Du Bois in 1918. His grandmother was sculptor and philanthropist Mary Ann Delafield DuBois. They had two children, Theodora (born 1919) and Eliot (born 1922). Her husband worked on the Manhattan Project; during World War II, the couple organized a committee at Yale University to assist displaced academics from Cambridge and Oxford, and their families. She was widowed when he died in 1965. She died in 1986, aged 95 years. Her papers are held by the Archives and Special Collections department, College of Staten Island.
