= Elisabeth Sanxay Holding =

American novelist

- Born: June 18, 1889; Brooklyn
- Died: February 7, 1955 (aged 65); Bronx
- Spouse: George E. Holding
- Writing career
- Genres: novels, short stories

Elisabeth Sanxay Holding (1889–1955) was an American novelist and short story writer. She primarily authored fiction in the hardboiled subgenre of detective novels.

== Life and career ==
Born June 18, 1889, in Brooklyn, New York, Sanxay attended Miss Whitcombe's and other schools for young ladies before marrying British diplomat George E. Holding in 1913. The couple had two daughters, Skeffington (1917-2009) and the enamelist and novelist Antonia Holding Schwed (1919-2006), and traveled widely in South America and the Caribbean before living in Bermuda for a number of years, where Mr. Holding was a government official. After Mr. Holding's retirement, the couple lived in the Bronx section of New York City, where Elisabeth Sanxay Holding died on February 7, 1955.

Elisabeth Sanxay Holding wrote romantic novels during the 1920s, but, after the stock market crash in 1929, she turned to the more lucrative genre of the detective novel. From 1929 through 1954, she wrote eighteen detective novels, which sold well and earned her praise for her style and character development. Her series character for these novels was Lieutenant Levy.

Holding also authored many short stories.

Her novel The Blank Wall (1947) was popular enough to inspire the film adaptation The Reckless Moment in 1949. It was adapted again into the 2001 The Deep End. It was republished by Persephone Books in 2003 and again in 2009. It appeared in 2015 as part of the Library of America's omnibus Women Crime Writers: Four Suspense Novels of the 1940s. A number of Holding's crime novels have been more recently reprinted by Stark House Press and other publishers and made available to new readers.

== Critical reputation ==
Holding was much admired during her day. Raymond Chandler, one of the top writers of detective fiction during its golden age of 1920–1940, said of Holding that she was "the top suspense writer of them all."

Literary critic and editor Anthony Boucher wrote that "For subtlety, realistic conviction, incredible economy, she's in a class by herself." Boucher also praised Holding's Miss Kelly, about a cat who learns to speak with humans, as "one of those too-rare juvenile fantasies with delightful appeal to the adult connoisseur." It also received a starred review from Kirkus Reviews.

== Bibliography ==
The Unlit Lamp (1922)

=== Adult ===
==== Romances ====
- Invincible Minnie (1920)
- Angelica (1921)
- Rosaleen Among the Artists (1921)
- The Unlit Lamp (1922)

==== Thrillers ====
- Miasma (1929)
- Dark Power (1930)
- The Death Wish (1934)
- The Unfinished Crime (1935)
- The Strange Crime in Bermuda (1937)
- The Obstinate Murderer (1938) (also published as No Harm Intended)
- The Girl Who Had To Die (1940)
- Who's Afraid? (1940) (also published as Trial By Murder)
- Speak of the Devil (1941)
- Kill Joy (1942) (also published as Murder is a Kill-Joy)
- Lady Killer (1942)
- The Old Battle Ax (1943)
- Net of Cobwebs (1945)
- The Innocent Mrs. Duff (1946)
- The Blank Wall (1947) (reprinted by Persephone Books)
- Too Many Bottles (1951) (also published as The Party Was the Pay-Off)
- The Virgin Huntress (1951)
- Widow's Mite (1953)

==== Stories ====
- "Patrick on the Mountain" (The Smart Set, July 1920)
- "The Problem that Perplexed Nicholson" (The Smart Set, Aug 1920)
- "Marie's View of It" (The Century Magazine, Dec 1920)
- "Mollie: The Ideal Nurse" (The Century Magazine, Jan 1921)
- "Angelica" (Munsey's, May-Oct 1921)
- "The Married Man" (Munsey's, Dec 1921)
- "The Foreign Woman" (Munsey's, July 1922)
- "Hanging's Too Good for Him" (Munsey's, Sept 1922)
- "Like a Leopard" (Munsey's, Nov 1922)
- "Lost Luck" (The Bookman, Dec 1922)
- "The Girl He Picked Up at Coney" (Metropolitan Magazine, Feb/Mar 1923)
- "The Aforementioned Infant" (Munsey's, Mar 1923)
- "It Seemed Reasonable" (Munsey's, Apr 1923)
- "Old Dog Tray" (Munsey's, May 1923)
- "The Matador" (Munsey's, June 1923)
- "A Hesitating Cinderella" (Munsey's, July 1923)
- "The Postponed Wedding" (Munsey's, Aug 1923)
- "With Unbowed Head" (The Century Magazine, Aug 1923)
- "This is Life" (The Nation, Aug 15 1923)
- "The Marquis of Carabas" (Munsey's, Sept 1923)
- "Out of the Woods" (Munsey's, Oct 1923)
- "Benedicta" (Munsey's, Dec 1923)
- "Nickie and Pem" (Munsey's, Feb 1924)
- "His Remarkable Future" (Munsey's, Apr 1924)
- "His Own People" (Munsey's, July 1924)
- "Who Is This Impossible Person?" (Munsey's, Aug 1924)
- "Ye Gods and Little Fishes" (The American Magazine, Aug 1924)
- "Mr. Martin Swallows the Anchor" (Munsey's, Sept 1924)
- "Too French" (Munsey's, Jan 1925)
- "The Good Little Pal" (Munsey's, Apr 1925)
- "Flowers for Miss Riordan" (Munsey's, May 1925)
- "Sometimes Things Do Happen" (Munsey's, June 1925)
- "Miss What's-Her-Name" (Munsey's, July 1925)
- "The Long Night" (Ladies' Home Journal, Sept 1925)
- "The Wonderful Little Woman" (Munsey's, Sept 1925)
- "As Patrick Henry Said" (Munsey's, Oct 1925)
- "The Worst Joke in the World" (Munsey's, Nov 1925)
- "As Is" (Munsey's, Dec 1925)
- "That's Not Love" (Munsey's, Jan 1926)
- "Rosalie Gets Out of the Cage" (The American Magazine, Feb 1926)
- "The Thing Beyond Reason" (Munsey's, Feb 1926)
- "Dogs Always Know" (Munsey's, Mar 1926)
- "Highfalutin'" (Munsey's, Apr 1926)
- "Bonnie Wee Thing" (Munsey's, May 1926)
- "Vanity" (Munsey's, Jun 1926)
- "The Compromising Letter" (Munsey's, July 1926)
- "Miss Cigale" (Munsey's, Aug 1926)
- "Blotted Out" (Munsey's, Sept 1926)
- "Human Nature Unmasked" (Munsey's, Oct 1926)
- "Home Fires" (Munsey's, Dec 1926)
- "The Grateful Lunella" (The American Magazine, May 1927)
- "The Old Ways" (Munsey's, July 1927)
- "By the Light of Day" (Munsey's, Aug 1927)
- "For Granted" (Munsey's, Nov 1927)
- "Incompatibility" (Munsey's, Dec 1927)
- "One Misty Night," (The American Magazine, Feb 1928)
- "Derelict" (Munsey's, Mar 1928)
- "Half an Hour Late" (Woman's Home Companion, Mar 1928)
- "This Road Is Closed" (The American Magazine, Apr 1928)
- "Inches and Ells" (Munsey's, June 1928)
- "It Is a Two-Edged Sword" (McCall's, June 1928)
- "Too Late" (Liberty, July 21, 1928)
- "Outside the Door" (The Elks Magazine, Oct 1928)
- "Hard as Nails" (Liberty, Oct 20 1928)
- "Important Things" (Liberty, Nov 17 1928)
- "A Dinner Date" (The American Magazine, Jan 1929)
- "Vera's Superior Smile" (Pictorial Review, Jan 1929)
- "Saving Up" (Liberty, Jan 5 1929)
- "Flow and Ebb" (Liberty, Jan 26 1929)
- "Without Benefit of Police" (Complete Stories, Feb 1929)
- "The Sin of Angels" (The American Magazine, Apr 1929)
- "Dare-Devil" (The American Magazine, June 1929)
- "Little Deeds of Kindness" (Liberty, July 6, 1929)
- "Broken Faith" (The American Magazine, Oct 1929; Cassell's Magazine of Fiction, July 1930)
- "Carline" (Liberty, Oct 12, 1929)
- "Rose-Leaves" (Liberty, Jan 18 1930)
- "The Chain of Death" (Liberty, May 24, May 31, Jun 7, Jun 14, Jun 21 1930)
- "The Girl in Armor" (Street & Smith's Detective Story Magazine, Aug 8 1931)
- "It's All Right for Men" (Liberty, Oct 10 1931)
- "Brides of Crime" (Street & Smith's Detective Story Magazine, Nov 7, 1931)
- "The Preposterous Mrs. Manders" (Woman's Home Companion, Mar 1932)
- "Hound's Bay" (Street & Smith's Detective Story Magazine, Mar 26 1932)
- "If It Hadn't Been for Laurel" (Liberty, Jan 28 1933)
- "A Man Can Take It" (Collier's Weekly, May 12, 1934)
- "The Green Bathtub" (Collier's Weekly, June 16, 1934)
- "The Last Night" (The Passing Show, July 14, 1934)
- "All She Could Get" (Collier's Weekly, Sept 15 1934)
- ""I Could Brighten Your Life!"" (The American Magazine, Jan 1935)
- "The Bride Comes Home" (Cosmopolitan, Feb 1935)
- "The Root of Evil" (Collier's Weekly, Apr 27 1935)
- "Nobody Would Listen" (Mystery, Aug 1935)
- "Somebody's Cynthia" (Collier's Weekly, Aug 3 1935; The Passing Show, Nov 2 1935)
- "You Never Can Tell" (Collier's Weekly, Dec 14 1935; Grit, June 1936)
- "Unscathed" (Ladies' Home Journal, Jan 1936)
- "Lost" (Redbook, Feb 1936)
- "Cross Purposes" (Collier's Weekly, May 30, 1936)
- "Can Do!" (Pictorial Review, July 1936)
- "Scandal" (Woman's Home Companion, July 1936)
- "Night Life" (Redbook, Sept 1936)
- "Third Act" (Pictorial Review, Apr 1937)
- "Drifting" (McCall's, May 1937)
- "Wedding Day" (Cosmopolitan, Sept 1937)
- "The Nicest Little Lunch" (Cosmopolitan, Nov 1937)
- "Echo of a Careless Voice" (McCall's, Jan 1938)
- "Illusion" (Good Housekeeping, Aug 1938)
- "They Take It So Lightly!" (Cosmopolitan, Oct 1938)
- "Two Passes for the Show" (Liberty, Nov 5 1938)
- "So Sort of Proud" (Good Housekeeping, Mar 1939)
- "Money Can't Buy It" (Liberty, Aug 5 1939)
- "Open That Door" (Liberty, Aug 26 1939)
- "Blonde on a Boat" (The American Magazine, Dec 1939)
- "Late Date" (Cosmopolitan, May 1940)
- "Proposal" (McCall's, May 1940)
- "On Yonder Lea" (Good Housekeeping, Aug 1940)
- "Tropical Secretary" (The American Magazine, Feb 1941)
- "Tomorrow's Not Soon Enough" (McCall's, Mar 1941)
- "What It Takes" (Grit, Mar 9 1941)
- "Loved I Not Honor More" (Liberty, Apr 12 1941)
- "The Fearful Night" (The American Magazine, June 1941; expanded to The Obstinate Murderer)
- "Another Baby" (Woman's Home Companion, Nov 1941)
- "Not Goodbye But Au Revoir" (McCall's, Oct 1942)
- "The Kiskadee Bird" (Cosmopolitan, 1944)
- "The Old Battle-Ax" (1943; abridged, Liberty, Mar 18 1944)
- "Bait for a Killer" (Collier's Weekly, Sep 30 1944, as "The Blue Envelope"; The Saint Mystery Magazine, Mar 1959; The Saint Detective Magazine [Australia], Nov 1959; The Saint Mystery Magazine [UK], Oct 1960)
- "The Unbelievable Baroness" (The American Magazine, 1945)
- "The Net of Cobwebs" (Collier's Weekly, Jan 6, 13 & 20, 1945)
- "Funny Kind of Love" (as by Elizabeth Saxanay Holding, Boston Sunday Globe Magazine, Nov 11 1945)
- "Farewell to a Corpse" (Mystery Book Magazine, Oct 1946)
- ""Be Careful, Mrs. Williams"" (Cosmopolitan, July 1947)
- "The Stranger in the Car" (American Magazine, July 1949)
- "People Do Fall Downstairs" (Ellery Queen's Mystery Magazine, Aug 1947; Ellery Queen's Mystery Magazine [Australia], Aug 1949)
- "Friday, the Nineteenth" (The Magazine of Fantasy and Science Fiction, Summer 1950)
- "Farewell, Big Sister" (Ellery Queen's Mystery Magazine, July 1952; hardboiled satire)
- "The Death Wish" (Cosmopolitan, Feb 1953)
- "Most Audacious Crime" (Nero Wolfe Mystery Magazine, Jan 1954)
- "Shadow of Wings" (The Magazine of Fantasy and Science Fiction, July 1954)
- "Glitter of Diamonds" (Ellery Queen's Mystery Magazine, Mar 1955; Ellery Queen's Mystery Magazine [Australia], May 1955)
- "The Strange Children" (The Magazine of Fantasy and Science Fiction, Aug 1955)
- "Very, Very Dark Mink" (The Saint Detective Magazine, Dec 1956; The Saint Detective Magazine [UK], Oct 1957)
- "The Darling Doctor" (Alfred Hitchcock's Mystery Magazine, Mar 1957)
- "Game for Four Players" (Alfred Hitchcock's Mystery Magazine, June 1958)
- "The Blank Wall" (Alfred Hitchcock Presents: My Favorites in Suspense, 1959)

=== Children's ===
- Miss Kelly (1947)
