= Dana Lyon =

- Born: December 9, 1897
- Died: November 10, 1982
- Occupation: Crime writer

Mabel Dana Lyon (December 9, 1897 – November 10, 1982) was an American writer of mysteries, romances, and psychological thrillers.

Most of her works are set in suburban California. Her novel The Bathtub Murder (1933), written with Josephine Hugheston, was based on the case of David Lamson, a Stanford University employee who was placed on trial four times for the alleged murder of his wife. Her novels Tentacles (1950) and Spin the Web Tight (1963) are about newlywed Hilda Trenton, who is faced with domineering in-laws and an attempt on her life. Her novel The Frightened Child (1948), about a European refugee who assumes another woman's identity in America was filmed as The House on Telegraph Hill (1951). Lyon was also one of twelve authors to contribute a chapter to The Marble Forest (1951) under the collective pseudonym Theo Durrant. The book was filmed as Macabre (1958). She also published short stories in The Magazine of Fantasy & Science Fiction and Ellery Queen's Mystery Magazine.

Dana Lyon died on 10 November 1982.

== Personal life ==
In 1919, she married William Penn Lyon III, grandson of William Penn Lyon. She worked as a statistician for the International Brotherhood of Teamsters.

== Bibliography ==
- (with Josephine Hugheston) The Bathtub Murder. Williams, 1933.
- Women Love But Once. New York: Macaulay, 1933.
- Retaliation, Love's Kickback. Newark: Author Publications, Inc., 1934.
- Heartbreak. New York: William Godwin, Inc., 1935.
- Follow Me. New York: Godwin, 1936.
- Let Me Go. New York: Hillman Curl, 1937.
- Rapture Yet to Come. New York: Gramercy, 1939.
- No Shelter for the Heart. New York: M. S. Mill Co., 1940.
- It's My Own Funeral. New York: Farrar & Rinehart, 1941.
- A Good Family. New York: Gramercy, 1942.
- I'll Be Glad When You're Dead. Royce, 1945.
- The Frightened Child. New York: Harper and Brothers, 1948.
- The Tentacles. New York: Harper, 1950.
- The Lost One. Harper, 1958.
- Spin the Web Tight. Ace, 1963.
- The Trusting Victim. Ace, 1964.
