= David McDaniel =

American writer (1939–1977)

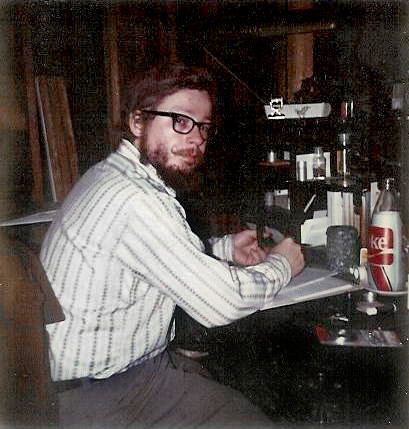
- David McDaniel at his desk, writing, 1974.
- Born: David Edward McDaniel; 16 June 1939; Toledo, Ohio, United States
- Died: 1 November 1977 (aged 38); Sunland-Tujunga, California
- Occupation: Novelist
- Writing career
- Genre: Science fiction
- Notable works: The Dagger Affair; The Vampire Affair; The Arsenal out of Time

David Edward McDaniel (16 June 1939 – 1 November 1977) was an American science fiction author, who also wrote spy fiction, including several novels based on the television series The Man from U.N.C.L.E.

== Biography ==
David McDaniel was born on 16 June 1939, in Toledo, Ohio. He studied cinematography at San Diego State University and then moved to Los Angeles. While living in Los Angeles, he joined science fiction fandom, where he used the pseudonym Ted Johnstone. This makes him one of the few authors to write under his real name but conduct his social life under a pseudonym. He was also known by the nickname "Tedron", the name of his character in a shared universe fantasy called Coventry.

David McDaniel died sometime in the early morning of 1 November 1977 while alone at his home. At the time of his death he was contracted to fly to Baton Rouge, Louisiana, for freelance work as a cameraman.

== Professional career ==
McDaniel sold two stories while still an undergraduate. Pulp writer Noel Loomis was teaching a course on writing at San Diego State, and offered an automatic "A" to any student who sold a story. McDaniel found a boy's magazine whose requirements he could meet, sent them two stories and they accepted both:

- A young English boy sees Vikings about to attack his village. He rouses the village and helps drive off the Vikings.
- A short science fiction story set in space about a teenage boy.

McDaniel wrote his first science fiction novel, titled The Weapons of XXX, and submitted it to Ace Books in early 1965. Terry Carr, a junior editor at Ace, liked it, but the chief editor, Don Wollheim, wasn't convinced, so they returned it. Ace then signed a contract to publish original novels based on the NBC television series The Man from U.N.C.L.E.. Carr remembered McDaniel's The Weapons of XXX and knew McDaniel was a big fan of the television show, so he asked him to submit a novel for The Man from U.N.C.L.E. project. The fourth novel to appear in the series was the result, The Dagger Affair (1965), which was one of the biggest sellers in the series. Carr asked him to write another, The Vampire Affair, and then signed him to a contract for six more. Royalty statements received from Ace Books showed The Vampire Affair as the biggest seller of the six U.N.C.L.E. novels that McDaniel wrote.

McDaniel's first novel, The Weapons of XXX, eventually was published by Ace in 1967 under the title The Arsenal Out of Time. The book as originally written was slightly longer than Ace's standard book length at the time, so he was asked to shorten it by about 2000 words. He deleted a scene which did nothing to advance the plot but humorously depicted (Tuckerized) a personal friend of McDaniel's. The missing scene was later published in the fanzine The Best of Apa-L #3.

His last novel, The Final Affair, was intended to by Carr to be the final book in The Man from U.N.C.L.E. series. However, McDaniel was several months late finishing the book, and by that time the series was no longer on TV and The Final Affair was never published, but it can be found online (see External links below).

More details can be found in "The inside story of how DMcDaniel became involved in UNCLE" [sic] at The Fans from U.N.C.L.E. website.

== Bibliography ==
=== U.N.C.L.E. novels ===
- The Dagger Affair (#4 in the series) (1966)
- The Vampire Affair (#6) (1966)
- The Monster Wheel Affair (#8) (1967)
- The Rainbow Affair (#13) (1967)
- The Utopia Affair (#15) (1968)
- The Hollow Crown Affair (#17) (1969)
- The Final Affair (unpublished)

=== Other TV related novels ===
- "The Prisoner" series: The Prisoner: Number Two, (1969) also known as Who is Number Two, the second book in the series based on the TV series

=== Stand alone novels ===
- The Arsenal Out of Time, Ace Books, 1967 (Ace G-667, SBN 020-07667) (cover by Frank Kelly Freas)

=== Short stories ===
- "Quiet Village", a short story set in the same fictional history published in Analog in 1970 and reprinted in the collection There Will Be War, edited by Jerry Pournelle, Tor Books, 1983.
- "Prognosis: Terminal," in 2020 Vision, Jerry Pournelle, ed. Avon Books, 1974.

== Fan career ==
Letter to Lee Klingstein on Thrush Letterhead. The addresses at the top are those of McDaniel, Ace Books, and Dean Dickensheet. The logo was drawn by Don Simpson. As an inside joke, McDaniel would sometimes send letters to friends on stationery bearing the "letterhead" of The U.N.C.L.E. or Thrush.

Under his fan name of Ted Johnstone, McDaniel served as Official Arbiter of an SF fan APA called The Cult. He served as editor of the LASFS's Official Organ, Shangri L'Affaires (aka "Shaggy"), in 1964-5. He was active in the LASFS's weekly Amateur Press Association, APA-L, for over a year, publishing a weekly zine titled "B-Roll Negative". In addition, he wrote a column, "A Slow Train through Gondor".

At various times he served as "Director" (presiding officer) and as "Scribe" (secretary) of the LASFS, and is remembered as a "Patron Saint" (substantial donor).

He was Chairman of Westercon XX in 1967 (officially called "Shere-Con" because it was held at the Sheraton-West hotel in Los Angeles, but also referred to as "Double-Cross Con" because of internal fights within the operating committee. Shortly before the convention actually began, Brandon Lamont was named acting chairman by the committee for the duration of the convention.)

McDaniel wrote several filk songs, including "High Fly the Nazgul-O" (tune: "Green Grow the Rushes-O) and "The Mimeo Crank Chanty" (tune: "Haul Away Joe").

Some photos of McDaniel/Johnstone can be found on the LASFS website.
