= Swordsmen in the Sky =

1964 anthology edited by Donald A. Wollheim

- Cover of first edition
- Editor: Donald A. Wollheim
- Illustrator: Jack Gaughan
- Cover artist: Frank Frazetta
- Language: English
- Genre: Science fantasy
- Publisher: Ace Books
- Publication date: 1964
- Publication place: United States
- Media type: Print (paperback)
- Pages: 192
- OCLC: 4270024

Swordsmen in the Sky is an anthology of science fantasy short stories, edited by Donald A. Wollheim. It was first published in paperback by Ace Books in 1964. The book has been translated into German.

== Summary ==
The book collects five classic science fantasy short stories and novelettes, originally published from 1933 to 1951.

== Contents ==
- "Swordsman of Lost Terra" (from Planet Stories v. 5, no. 3, Nov. 1951) (Poul Anderson)
- "The People of the Crater" (from Fantasy Book v. 1, no. 1, Jul. 1947) (Andre Norton)
- "The Moon That Vanished" (from Thrilling Wonder Stories v. 33, no. 1, Oct. 1948) (Leigh Brackett)
- "A Vision of Venus" (from Amazing Stories v. 8, no. 8, Dec. 1933) (Otis Adelbert Kline)
- "Kaldar, World of Antares" (from The Magic Carpet Magazine v. 3, no. 2, Apr. 1933) (Edmond Hamilton)

== Reception ==
Charles Saunders, writing on blackgate.com, called the book "something of a harbinger of the sword-and-sorcery boom that was only a few years away from beginning." Of the contents, he praised the Anderson and Brackett pieces as "classics in the sense that they continue to fascinate with each re-reading, even though they were first published in 1951 and 1948, respectively," the Norton, a lost race tale, as "a slight cut below the Brackett and Anderson entries, but a large cut above most tales of its type," and the Hamilton as "a rip-roaring interstellar thriller ... with forerunners to the Star Trek matter transporter and the Star Wars light-saber," while noting "the plot relies too much on howling coincidences." He finds only the Kline piece deficient; "[i]n comparison with the other stories in Swordsmen, this one is a squib — almost a “Cliff’s Notes” condensation of the genre."

John ONeill, also on blackgate.com, characterized it as "hugely influential," a book that "looms large for SF and fantasy fans of the 60s and 70 [as] the first true science fantasy anthology in the sp[i]rit of Edgar Rice Burroughs."
