= Star Bridge =

1955 novel by Jack Williamson

- Dust-jacket from the first edition
- Author: Jack Williamson and James E. Gunn
- Cover artist: Mel Hunter
- Language: English
- Genre: Science fiction
- Publisher: Gnome Press
- Publication date: 1955
- Publication place: United States
- Media type: Print (hardcover)
- Pages: 221
- OCLC: 4270257

Star Bridge is a science fiction novel by American authors Jack Williamson and James E. Gunn. It was published in 1955 by Gnome Press in an edition of 5,000 copies, of which 900 copies were never bound. It was also issued in paperback by Ace (D-169, 1955, 35¢, and F-241, 40¢) and reissued by Berkley Books in 1977 and by Ballantine Books in 1982 (with minor typographic errors).

Williamson initially wrote about 50 pages in manuscript for the first draft, and worked up about 150 pages of notes for the novel's completion. Finding himself "blocked" on the project, he turned his materials over to Gunn, who completed the book. It was sold to Gnome for a $500 advance.

== Plot summary ==
The scattered planets are held together by the Eron Company, holder—at least apparently—of the secret of faster-than-light travel through the Tubes, which are powered through energy drawn from the star Canopus. The leaders of Eron are gathered on ancient Earth to dedicate a new Tube, near the ruins of what had been Denver, Colorado.

Though aging General Manager Garth Kohlnar is nearing death from natural causes, the adventurer Horn has been hired by parties unknown to assassinate him. Making his way through the desert, past a gauntlet of guards and security forces, Horn encounters Wu, an aging Chinese vendor, and his curious shape-changing companion Lil, neither of whom seem capable of surviving the dangers and harsh conditions of the desert. Yet they are every bit his equal in reaching the celebration, descending from hiding to mingle with the wealthy, entertaining the idle while Lil steals and consumes their diamonds. Horn completes his mission, and in the desperate struggle to escape the ensuing manhunt, he encounters Wendre Kohlnar, the beautiful daughter and now possibly the heir-apparent of the dead man.

Escaping through a transdimensional Tube in a space suit, Horn finds himself on the planet Eron, a world consumed by the Eron Company. Here he encounters a corrupt and effeminate aristocracy, a brewing power struggle over the succession, a covert revolution, a secret subway known only to the Directors—and Wu and Lil, at every turn displaying more mysterious knowledge and capability. The mystery of who actually knows the secret of the Tubes becomes increasingly important in the quest to become General Manager.

Horn attends a meeting of the Directors in disguise, with Wu playing the role of Director Matal (the real one having been murdered by an agent of the ambitious Duchane, Director of Security). Horn and Wu rescue Wendre and escape while the other Directors are locked in a presumably fatal struggle. They make their way to the North Polar Cap and attempt to turn off the Tubes, finding that mere possession of pure Golden Blood is not, in fact, the secret of deactivating them. Troops and revolutionaries clash incoherently at the polar cap, and Horn is eventually captured and sent to the prison planet of Vantee. Forging an alliance with the outlaws there, he takes advantage of the political conflict in the home world to capture the prison, apparently rescuing in the process Peter Sair, the Liberator, the leader of the failed revolt against Eron wherein Horn learned his skills.

Returning with Sair to the chaos of Eron, Horn is able to capture the critical polar cap Tube station and thus take control of the planet, which he hands over to Wendre, and she in turn to Sair. As Horn and Wendre Kohlnar interview the imprisoned Duchane, Horn is tricked into shooting the prisoner just before he can reveal a key secret: the nature of Wu. Wu, in turn, falls victim to the temptation to explain his curious place in history to Horn, his intended victim, but Horn is rescued by Wendre and Wu is apparently (finally) shot dead. Wendre and Horn plan to marry and move to the rural Cluster, far from her Eronian home.

== Reception ==
Anthony Boucher dismissed the novel as "pretty lifeless fiction, in which both prose and characterization emerge directly from the machine, untouched by human hands." P. Schuyler Miller, however, found Star Bridge to be "a grand, old-fashioned razzle-dazzle yarn" and "unabashed action-adventure", concluding "Even though it probably won't be on any 'best' lists, it's fun to read." The New York Times's Villiers Gerson similarly described it as a "fast-moving blood-and-thunder novel".

Both Samuel R. Delany and Edward Bryant cited Star Bridge as the book which "turned [them] on" to science fiction. More than twenty years after it first appeared, a surprised Gerald Jonas raved over the novel in The New York Times Book Review, saying "this obscure [novel] reads more like a collaboration between Heinlein and Asimov, noting that one reason "the book works so well [is] because the authors are not ashamed of what they are doing at any level."
