= Neil R. Jones =

American novelist

Neil Ronald Jones
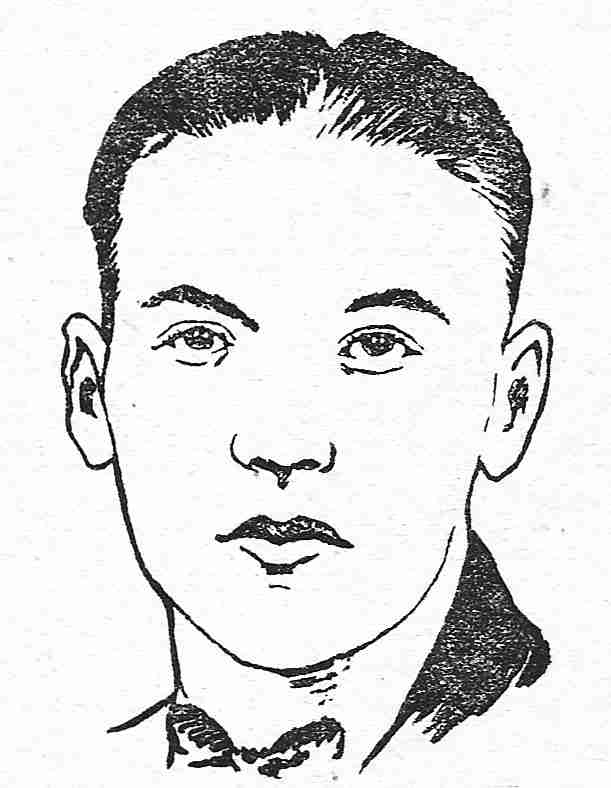
- Neil R. Jones as pictured in Air Wonder Stories, January 1930
- Born: Neil Ronald Jones; May 29, 1909
- Died: February 15, 1988 (aged 78)

Neil Ronald Jones (May 29, 1909 – February 15, 1988) was an American writer who worked for the state of New York. His first story, "The Death's Head Meteor," was published in Air Wonder Stories in 1930, possibly recording the first use of "astronaut" in fiction. He also pioneered cyborg and robotic characters, and is credited with inspiring the modern idea of cryonics. Most of his stories fit into a "future history" like that of Robert A. Heinlein or Cordwainer Smith, well before either of them used this convention in their fiction.

== Professor Jameson stories ==
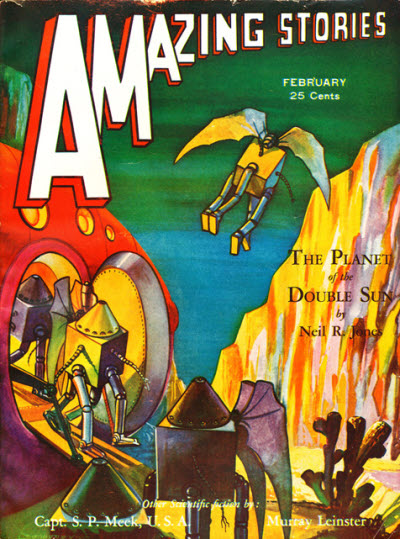
"The Planet of the Double Sun," the second entry in the Professor Jameson series, was the cover story in the February 1932 issue of Amazing Stories

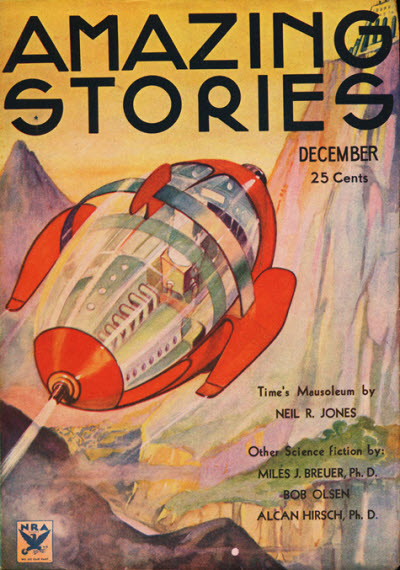
"Time's Mausoleum," the fifth Professor Jameson story, was cover-featured on the December 1933 issue of Amazing Stories

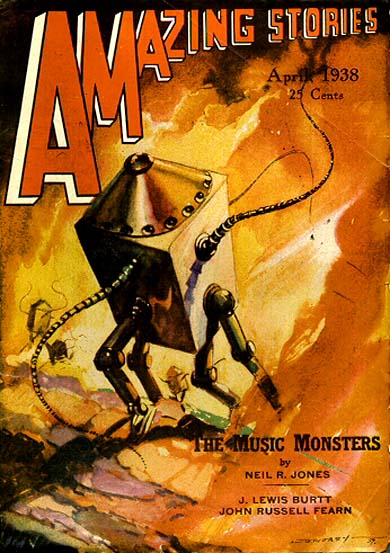
"The Music-Monsters" was the last Professor Jameson story to be published in Amazing Stories, taking the cover of the April 1938 issue

The first installment of Jones' most popular creation, "The Jameson Satellite," appeared in the July 1931 issue of Amazing Stories. The hero was Professor Jameson, the last Earthman, who became immortal through the science of the Zoromes. Jameson was obsessed with the idea of perfectly preserving his body after death and succeeded by having it launched into space in a small capsule. Jameson's body survived for 40,000,000 years, where it was found orbiting a dead planet Earth by a passing Zorome exploration ship. The Zoromes, or machine men as they sometimes called themselves, were cyborgs. They came from a race of biological beings who had achieved immortality by transferring their brains to machine bodies. They occasionally assisted members of other races with this transition (e.g. the Tri-Peds and the Mumes), allowing others to become Zoromes and join them on their expeditions, which sometimes lasted hundreds of years. So, much like the Borg of the Star Trek series, a Zorome crew could be made up of assimilated members of many different biological species. The Zoromes discovered that Jameson's body had been so well preserved that they were able to repair his brain, incorporate it into a Zorome machine body and restart it. The professor joined their crew and, over the course of the series, participated in many adventures, even visiting Zor, the Zorome homeworld, where he met biological Zoromes. The professor eventually rose to command his own crew of machine men on a new Zorome exploration ship. "The Jameson Satellite" proved so popular with readers that later installments in Amazing Stories got not only cover mentions but the cover artwork. The series eventually became some of the most popular and well-known of the 1930s pulps.

Being cryopreserved and revived is an idea that would recur in hundreds of science fiction novels, movies, and television shows. One young science fiction fan who read "The Jameson Satellite" and drew inspiration from the idea of cryonics was Robert Ettinger, who became known as the father of cryonics. An eleven and a half year old Isaac Asimov also read the story. Asimov noted that the Zorome's organic brains were a minor detail, "Jones treated them as mechanical men, making them objective without being unfeeling, benevolent without being busybodies." He cites Jones' Zoromes as the "spiritual ancestors" of his positronic robot series and credits them as the origin of his attraction to the idea of benevolent robots.

Masamune Shirow paid homage to Jones in his cyborg-populated Ghost in the Shell (1989-90) saga by including a no-frills brain-in-a-box design, even naming them Jameson-type cyborgs.

Just as the Jameson stories inspired Asimov, Ettinger, and other young readers, Neil R. Jones has said he was inspired to invent the Zoromes by H. G. Wells's martians from The War of the Worlds, whose weak bodies were augmented by giant war machines. He also drew inspiration from Sewell Peaslee Wright's stories of Commander Hanson and the space patrol which were running in Astounding Stories around the time Jones began writing the Jameson series.

Jameson (or 21MM392, as he was known to his fellow metal beings) was the subject of twenty-one stories between 1931 and 1951, when Jones stopped writing, with ten stories still unpublished. In the late 1960s, Ace Books editor Donald A. Wollheim compiled five collections, comprising sixteen of these, including two previously unpublished. In April 1989, "Exiles from Below" was published in Astro-Adventures #7. In all, there were thirty-one Jameson stories written. This total reflects the addition of a little known and never-before-published story, "The Metal Menace," which was discovered in the Neil R. Jones Papers held by the Special Collections Research Center, Syracuse University Libraries and published in Worlds of IF #178 (March 2025) with permission granted by Syracuse and the Neil R. Jones Literary Estate, as detailed in the magazine. All thirty-one stories have been published.

R. D. Mullen, reviewing The Planet of the Double Sun, commented that while many readers have found the stories memorable despite their exceptionally crude writing, he found the characters and events "of such little interest that I feel no desire to follow them through the succeeding stories." Everett F. Bleiler found the stories marked by "drearily innocuous similarities" as well as "weak writing and literary flatness." In contrast, Isaac Asimov wrote of his experience reading the Jameson Satellite as a pre-teen, "None of the flaws in language and construction were obvious. . . . What I responded to was the tantalizing glimpse of possible immortality and the vision of the world's sad death." With the pulp audience of the 1930s, the Jameson stories were very popular, as evidenced by the amount of praise that appeared in the letters column.

== Bibliography ==
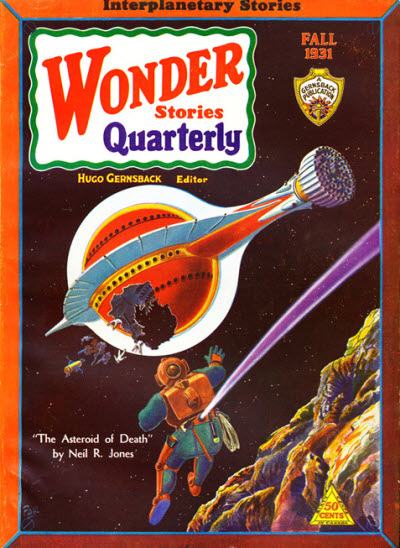
Jones's novelette, "The Asteroid of Death," the first installment in his Durna Rangue series, was the cover story in the Fall 1931 issue of Wonder Stories Quarterly

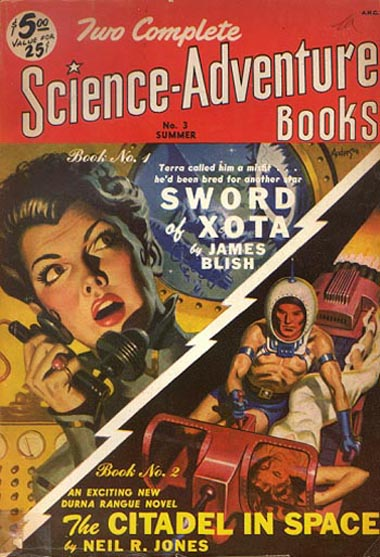
Jones's final Durna Rangue story, "The Citadel in Space," was published in Two Complete Science-Adventure Books in 1951, but has never been reprinted

Professor Jameson stories

- "The Jameson Satellite" (Amazing Stories, July 1931; Amazing Stories, April 1956 - reprint; Ace Books collection #1, 1967)
- "The Planet of the Double Sun" (Amazing Stories, February 1932; Amazing Stories, November 1962 - reprint; Ace Books collection #1, 1967)
- "The Return of the Tripeds" (Amazing Stories, May 1932; Ace Books collection #1, 1967)
- "Into the Hydrosphere" (Amazing Stories, October 1933; Ace Books collection #2, 1967)
- "Time's Mausoleum" (Amazing Stories, December 1933; Ace Books collection #2, 1967)
- "The Sunless World" (Amazing Stories, December 1934; Ace Books collection #2, 1967)
- "Zora of the Zoromes" (Amazing Stories, March 1935; Ace Books collection #3, 1967)
- "Space War" (Amazing Stories. July 1935; Ace Books collection #3, 1967)
- "Labyrinth" (Amazing Stories, April 1936, Ace Books collection #3, 1967)
- "Twin Worlds" (Amazing Stories, April 1937, Ace Books collection #4, 1967)
- "On the Planet Fragment" (Amazing Stories, October 1937, Ace Books collection #4, 1967)
- "The Music-Monsters" (Amazing Stories, April 1938, Ace Books collection #4, 1967)
- "The Cat-Men of Aemt" (Astonishing Stories, August 1940)
- "Cosmic Derelict" (Astonishing Stories, February 1941)
- "Slaves of the Unknown" (Astonishing Stories, March 1942)
- "Doomsday on Ajiat" (Astonishing Stories, 10/42, Ace Books collection #5, 1968)
- "The Metal Moon" (Super Science Stories, September 1949, Ace Books collection #5, 1968)
- "Parasite Planet" (Super Science Stories, November 1949)
- "World without Darkness" (Super Science Stories, March 1950)
- "The Mind Masters" (Super Science Stories, September 1950)
- "The Star Killers" (Super Science Stories, August 1951)
- "In the Meteoric Cloud" (Ace Books collection #5, 1968)
- "The Accelerated World" (Ace Books collection #5, 1968)
- "Battle Moon" (Worlds of IF #178, March 2025)
- "The Voice Across Space" (Worlds of IF #179, November 2025)
- "The Lost Nation" (Worlds of IF #179, November 2025)
- "Exiles from Below" (Astro-Adventures #7, April 1989)
- "The Satellite Sun" (Worlds of IF #180, November 2026)
- "Hidden World" (Worlds of IF #180, November 2026)
- "The Metal Menace" (Worlds of IF #178, March 2025)
- "The Sun Dwellers" (Worlds of IF #180, November 2026)

Ace Books Professor Jameson Collections

- The Planet of the Double Sun (Ace #F-420, 1967) - paperback, cover art by Gray Morrow
- The Sunless World (Ace #G-631, 1967) - paperback, cover art by Gray Morrow
- Space War (Ace #G-650, 1967) - paperback, cover art by Gray Morrow
- Twin Worlds (Ace #G-681, 1967) - paperback, cover art by Gray Morrow
- Doomsday on Ajiat (Ace #G-719, 1968) - paperback, cover art by Gray Morrow

Durna Rangue Stories

- "The Asteroid of Death" (Wonder Stories Quarterly, Fall 1931)
- "The Moon Pirates" (Amazing Stories, September 1934, October 1934)
- "Little Hercules" (Astounding Science Fiction, September 1936)
- "Durna Rangue Neophyte" (Astounding Stories, June 1937)
- "Invisible One" (Super Science Stories, September 1940)
- "Vampire of the Void" (Planet Stories, Spring 1941)
- "Captives of the Durna Rangue" (Super Science Novels Magazine, March 1941)
- "Priestess of the Sleeping Death" (Amazing Stories, April 1941)
- "The Citadel in Space" (Two Complete Science-Adventure Books, Summer 1951)

Other stories

- "The Death's Head Meteor" (Air Wonder Stories, January 1930)
- "The Electrical Man" (Scientific Detective Monthly, May 1930)
- "Suicide Durkee's Last Ride" (Amazing Stories, September 1932)
- "Shipwrecked on Venus" (Wonder Stories Quarterly, Winter 1932)
- "Escape from Phobos" (Wonder Stories, February 1933)
- "Martian and Troglodyte" (Amazing Stories, May 1933; Amazing Stories, August 1967 - reprint)
- "The Astounding Exodus" (Thrilling Wonder Stories, April 1937)
- "Kiss of Death" (Amazing Stories, December 1938)
- "The Swordsmen of Saturn" (Science Fiction, October 1939)
- "Liquid Hell" (Future Fiction, July 1940)
- "The Dark Swordsmen of Saturn" (Planet Stories, Summer 1940)
- "Hermit of Saturn's Ring" (Planet Stories Fall 1940)
- "The Ransom for Toledo" (Comet, May 1941)
- "Spoilers of the Spaceways" (Planet Stories, Winter 1942)

== Sources ==
- Ash, Brian. Who's Who in Science Fiction. Taplinger, 1976.
- Ashley, Michael, ed. The History of Science Fiction Magazine. Part 2: 1936 - 1945. New English Library 1975.
- Ashley, Michael, The Immortal Professor, Astro Adventures, Number 7, April 1989.
- Bleiler, Everett F.; Richard Bleiler (1998). Science-Fiction: The Gernsback Years. Kent State University Press.
- Greenberg, Martin H., ed. Amazing Science Fiction Anthology: The Wonder Years 1926-1935. TSR Inc., 1987.
