= The Blind Spot =

1921 novel by Austin Hall

- Dust-jacket from the first edition
- Author: Austin Hall and Homer Eon Flint
- Illustrator: Hannes Bok
- Cover artist: Hannes Bok
- Language: English
- Genre: Science fiction
- Publisher: Prime Press
- Publication date: 1951
- Publication place: United States
- Media type: Print (Hardback)
- Pages: 293
- OCLC: 7329780
- Followed by: The Spot of Life

The Blind Spot is a science fiction novel by American writers Austin Hall and Homer Eon Flint. The novel was originally serialized in six parts in the magazine Argosy beginning in May 1921. It was first published in book form in 1951 by Prime Press in an edition of 74,200 copies, though fewer than 800 were actually bound, and the remainder are assumed lost. The sequel, The Spot of Life, was written by Hall alone.

== Plot introduction ==
The novel concerns an interdimensional doorway between worlds.

== Reception ==
In In Search of Wonder, Damon Knight is critical of the novel's coherence, scientific accuracy and style:

The Blind Spot, by Austin Hall and Homer Eon Flint, is an acknowledged classic of fantasy, first published in 1921; much praised since then, several times reprinted, venerated by connoisseurs - all despite the fact that the book has no recognizable vestige of merit.

Groff Conklin, however, more generously termed The Blind Spot an "honored classic" despite being "overwritten [and] leaning a little heavily on the pseudo-metaphysical." Forrest J Ackerman described it in Astounding as a "luxuriantly glorious Merrittesque [fantasy] of dimensional interstices" and "a highly philosophical work."

Dave Langford reviewed The Blind Spot for White Dwarf #91, and stated that "You can enjoy spotting the howlers; in this dotty pulp melodrama and trying to work out what'll happen next, information quite evidently hidden from the authors ..."

Everett F. Bleiler wrote that The Blind Spot "used to be regarded as one of the classics of early science-fiction, but now it is much less esteemed." He concluded that while its opening section "evoke[s] a considerable sense of wonder," the novel "soon degenerates into a routine adventure story with loose ends."

== Sources ==
- Chalker, Jack L.; Mark Owings (1998). The Science-Fantasy Publishers: A Bibliographic History, 1923-1998. Westminster, MD and Baltimore: Mirage Press, Ltd. p. 532.
- Clute, John; Peter Nicholls (1995). The Encyclopedia of Science Fiction. New York: St. Martin's Griffin. p. 535. ISBN 0-312-13486-X.
- Tuck, Donald H. (1974). The Encyclopedia of Science Fiction and Fantasy. Chicago: Advent. p. 202. ISBN 0-911682-20-1.
