= Austin Hall (writer) =

American novelist

- Born: c. 1885
- Died: 1933 (aged 47–48)
- Occupations: Novelist, short story writer
- Writing career
- Genres: Science fiction, Fantasy, Western

Austin Hall (c.1885 – 1933) was an American short story writer and novelist. He began writing when, while working as a cowboy, he was asked to write a story. He wrote westerns, science fiction and fantasy for pulp magazines.

== Works ==
(from the Internet Speculative Fiction Database)

Novels

- The Blind Spot (1921), with Homer Eon Flint
- People of the Comet (1923)
- The Spot of Life (1932)

Serials

- Into the Infinite (1919)

Short fiction

- "Almost Immortal" (1916)
- "The Rebel Soul" (1917)
- "The Man Who Saved the Earth" (1919)

== Sources ==
- Clute, John; Peter Nicholls (1995). The Encyclopedia of Science Fiction. New York: St. Martin's Griffin. p. 535. ISBN 0-312-13486-X.
- Tuck, Donald H. (1974). The Encyclopedia of Science Fiction and Fantasy. Chicago: Advent. p. 202. ISBN 0-911682-20-1.
