= Homer Eon Flint =

American writer

- Born: Homer Eon Flindt; 1888
- Died: March 27, 1924 (aged 35–36)

Homer Eon Flint (born as Homer Eon Flindt; 1888 –1924) was an American writer of pulp science fiction novels and short stories.

He began working as a scenarist for silent films in 1912 (reportedly at his wife's insistence). In 1918, he published "The Planeteer" in All-Story Weekly. His "Dr. Kinney" stories were reprinted by Ace Books in 1965, and with Austin Hall he co-wrote the novel The Blind Spot.

He died in 1924 under mysterious circumstances, his body found at the bottom of a canyon underneath a stolen taxi.

His son was Max Hugh Flindt (1915–2004), the co-founder of The Ancient Astronaut Society. With Otto Binder, he co-authored Mankind – Child of the Stars in 1974. He also had a daughter, Bonnie Palmer.

== Works ==
(from the Internet Speculative Fiction Database)

Novels

- The Blind Spot (1921) with Austin Hall

Story collections

- The Lord of Death and The Queen of Life (1965)
- The Devolutionist and The Emancipatrix (1965)
- The Interplanetary Adventures of Dr. Kinney (2008)

Serials

- Out of the Moon (1924)

Short fiction

- "The Planeteer" (1918)
- "The King of Conserve Island" (1918)
- "The Man in the Moon" (1919)
- "The Lord of Death" (1919)
- "The Queen of Life" (1919)
- "The Greater Miracle" (1920)
- "The Devolutionist" (1921)
- "The Emancipatrix" (1921)
- "The Nth Man" (1928), adapted in 1957 as the AIP feature film The Amazing Colossal Man

Career Retrospective

- The 26th Golden Age of Science Fiction Megapack: Homer Eon Flint, edited, annotated & introduced, with individual story introductions and much biographical content and unpublished fiction, by Vella Munn, (Wildside Press 2015, omnibus, ebook) - over 500,000 words of fiction
  - A Note from the Publisher, John Gregory Betancourt, (in) *
    - Excerpt: "Decades later his oldest granddaughter, Vella Munn, has penned introductions to his unpublished short stories and added photographs and memories of the young author’s life. She has also written a biography of his life—the story of his passions, intellect, and creativity. It’s also a search for the truth behind his violent end."
  - Grandfather Lost: The Story of Homer Eon Flint, Vella Munn, (ar) * - 38300 words; biography, basically a book in its own right, with copious letters and black-and-white photographs.
  - "The Planetary Pirate," (nv) *
  - "The Planeteer," (na) All-Story Weekly March 9, 1918 - 38300 words
  - "The Man in the Moon," (nv) All-Story Weekly Oct. 04 1919
  - "The Nth Man," (na) Amazing Stories Quarterly Spring 1928 - 37200 words
  - The Blind Spot (with Austin Hall), (n) Argosy All-Story Weekly May 14, 1921 (+5) / Prime Press 1951 - 105500 words, read online at Project Gutenberg
  - The Devolutionist & The Emancipatrix, Ace 1965 (c, pb) - 66000 words, read online at Project Gutenberg
    - "The Devolutionist," (na) Argosy All-Story Weekly July 23, 1921
    - "The Emancipatrix," (na) Argosy All-Story Weekly Sep. 03 1921
  - "The Greater Miracle," (ss) All-Story Weekly April 24, 1920
  - The Lord of Death & The Queen of Life, Ace 1965 (c, pb) - 47300 words, read online at Project Gutenberg
    - "The Lord of Death," (na) All-Story Weekly May 10, 1919
    - "The Queen of Life," (na) All-Story Weekly Aug. 16 1919
  - Unpublished fiction:
  - "Buy a Liberty Bomb!" (ss) *
  - "The Flying Bloodhound," (ss) *
  - "Golden Web Claim," (nv) *
  - "Luck," (ss) *
  - "The Stain in the Table," (ss) *
  - Steal Me If You Can, (novel) * - 61200 words
  - "No Fool," (ss) *
  - "The Breaker Mends," (ss) *
  - "The Man Who Took Paris," (ss) *
  - "The Perfect Curiosity," (ss) *
  - "The Peacock Vest," (ss) *
  - The Missing Mondays, (novel) Argosy Allstory Weekly Jan. 20 1923 (+1) - 41200 words
  - The Money-Miler, (novel) Flynn's Weekly Oct. 04 1924 (+2) - 48800 words
