= Nunsowe Green =

British writer

Nunsowe Green (or Greene) was the pseudonym for an unidenitified 19th-century British novelist. He may have been a fellow of the Royal Astronomical Society. He is known for authoring the 1882 science fiction novel A Thousand Years Hence. Green is mentioned alongside Jules Verne by a character in the novel The Saliva Tree (1966) by Brian Aldiss, which also refers to H. G. Wells.
