= List of works of fiction about size change =

Resizing is a common plot element in fiction. Works where it plays a prominent role are listed below. For stories about resizing in antiquity, see Size change in fiction § Mythological precursors.

== Literature and comics ==
This list describes novels and short stories in which resizing is central to the plot or the premise of the work.

Year	Title	Author(s)	Description
1865	Alice's Adventures in Wonderland	Lewis Carroll	At some points throughout the story, Alice grows or shrinks as she eats foodstuffs or drinks potions.
1904	The Food of the Gods and How It Came to Earth	H. G. Wells	A chemist experiments with a substance that causes animals and people that ingest it to grow into giants.
1906	The Wonderful Adventures of Nils	Selma Lagerlöf	While his family is at church, Nils Holgersson captures a tomte, who offers Nils a gold coin if he releases him. Nils declines and the tomte shrinks him down to the size of a tomte.
1928	Out of the Sub-Universe	Roman Frederick Starzl	After discovering a method of resizing inanimate objects and living things, Professor Halley attempts to send two human volunteers to an atomic world by shrinking them.
1936	He Who Shrank	Henry Hasse	A man continuously shrinks through endless levels of worlds nested within worlds.
1937	The Extraordinary Adventures of Karik and Valya	Janis Larri	Two children drink a miniaturizing elixir by mistake, shrink about two hundred times, and go on adventures in the grass "jungles".
1940	Jimmy's Pocket Grandpa		
1942	Twig	Elizabeth Orton Jones	A girl named Twig asks an elf who visits her to make her the size of a fairy.
1953	Atta	Francis Rufus Bellamy	After being hit by lightning, a man wakes up half an inch tall, meets an ant named Atta, and returns to normal size after Atta dies.
1956	The Shrinking Man	Richard Matheson	A man accidentally ingests insecticide and is exposed to a cloud of radioactive spray, causing him to start shrinking, which he gradually does throughout the story.
1956	Mrs. Pepperpot	Alf Prøysen	The eponymous protagonist Mrs. Pepperpot occasionally shrinks down to the size of a pepperpot.
1971	The Shrinking of Treehorn	Florence Parry Heide	A young boy begins to notice that he is shrinking.
1973	A Wind in the Door	Madeleine L'Engle	A "singular cherubim" called Proginoskes takes Meg Murry inside of one of Charles Wallace's mitochondria in order to battle echthroi that have been making Charles Wallace ill by persuading his farandolae (fictional creatures residing within mitochondria) to not settle down and mature like they are supposed to.
1975	Peter's Pocket Grandpa		
1981	George's Marvellous Medicine	Roald Dahl	Eight-year-old George Kranky attempts to make a substitute for his grandmother's medicine by concocting a new, magical medicine, which he feeds to her as well as a chicken, causing both of them to grow.
1986	The Magic School Bus at the Waterworks	Joanna Cole	On a field trip, Ms. Frizzle's class shrinks down to the size of raindrops, falls into a water purification system, and returns to normal size after going through a faucet.
1987	Fantastic Voyage II: Destination Brain	Isaac Asimov	A group of scientists is miniaturized to go into the dying brain of Soviet scientist Pyotor Shapirov.
1989	The Magic School Bus Inside the Human Body	Joanna Cole	
1999	The Ant Bully	John Nickle	
2000	Captain Underpants and the Perilous Plot of Professor Poopypants	Dav Pilkey	A scientist named Professor Poopypants uses a shrink ray to shrink Jerome Horwitz Elementary School and give its students and faculty silly names in order to get revenge for being laughed at because of his own name.
2011	Micro	Michael Crichton, Richard Preston	

== Film ==
Resizing is a common theme and plot device in films. The list below covers films for which resizing is central to the plot or premise of the work.

Year	Title	Director(s)	Description
1901	The Dwarf and the Giant	Georges Méliès	A man portrayed by Méliès is split into two figures, one of which shrinks to a smaller size.
1936	The Devil-Doll	Tod Browning	Concerned about the effects of overpopulation on the Earth's resources, a French scientist creates a formula to shrink humans down to one sixth of their original size, but he dies shortly after a prison escape, and his former cellmate decides to use the formula in a revenge scheme in which he targets the people who had originally framed him for bank robbery and murder.
1936	Thru the Mirror	Walt Disney	Mickey's stomach rapidly spins uncontrollably, then expands. His feet grow first, then his whole entire body becomes ginormous. He ends up being the same size as a house and later shrinks to the size of a walnut.
1940	Dr. Cyclops	Ernest B. Schoedsack	A biologist shrinks down visitors who come to his laboratory in the jungles of the Amazon rainforest.
1955	Tarantula	Jack Arnold	A scientist tests a miracle nutrient on a tarantula, which escapes and grows larger and larger.
1957	Beginning of the End	Bert I. Gordon	After a scientist successfully grows vegetables by using radiation, the vegetables are eaten by locusts, which consequentially grow to gigantic size and attack Chicago.
1957	The Amazing Colossal Man	Bert I. Gordon	A U.S. Army lieutenant colonel grows to a height of 60 feet after being exposed to plutonium, losing his mind in the process.
1957	The Incredible Shrinking Man	Jack Arnold	A man begins to shrink after being exposed to a radioactive cloud while on a boating trip.
1958	Attack of the 50 Foot Woman	Nathan H. Juran	A wealthy heiress named Nancy Archer grows to gigantic size following an alien encounter.
1958	Attack of the Puppet People	Bert I. Gordon	The operator of a doll factory is revealed to have been shrinking humans down to the size of dolls.
1958	The 7th Voyage of Sinbad	Nathan H. Juran	A princess named Parisa is shrunk by a magician.
1959	The 30 Foot Bride of Candy Rock	Sidney Miller	An inventor's fiancée grows after being exposed to radiation in a cave.
1961	The Phantom Planet	William Marshall	Astronauts are forced to land on an asteroid and discover a humanoid species only six inches (15 cm) tall. The surviving astronaut is subsequently shrunk down to their size and is forced to deal with them.
1965	Village of the Giants	Bert I. Gordon	A group of teenagers gain access to a substance that causes living things to grow to gigantic proportions.
1966	Fantastic Voyage	Richard Fleischer	A submarine crew is shrunken down and placed inside a scientist's body.
1973	Joe the Little Boom Boom	Jean Image	When a group of boys encounter a spooky castle, they encounter a large man who traps them in a shrinking machine and shrinks them to the size of flies. Joe escapes and organizes bees and other woodland animals to rescue his friends.
1976	The Food of the Gods	Bert I. Gordon	
1981	The Incredible Shrinking Woman	Joel Schumacher	A woman begins to shrink after being exposed to experimental perfume and other chemicals. Later, when she is microscopic, she falls into a puddle of spilled household chemicals, causing her to return to normal size.
1986	Dot and Keeto	Yoram Gross	After she accidentally eats a magic root, Dot shrinks to the size of an insect and finds herself in a world of giant creatures.
1987	Innerspace	Joe Dante	A naval aviator volunteers to be shrunken and inserted into the body of a rabbit, but is accidentally injected into the body of a hypochondriac and is pursued by those who want the technology that was used to shrink him.
1989	Honey, I Shrunk the Kids	Joe Johnston	Four children are accidentally shrunk to a quarter of an inch tall.
1992	FernGully: The Last Rainforest	Bill Kroyer	In a rainforest inhabited by fairies, a young logger named Zak is accidentally shrunk by a fairy named Crysta.
1992	Honey, I Blew Up the Kid	Randal Kleiser	A two-year-old boy gradually grows to enormous size after being accidentally exposed to a growth machine.
1993	Attack of the 50 Ft. Woman	Christopher Guest	Nancy Archer grows into a giant after having encountered a UFO earlier in the film.
1995	Attack of the 60 Foot Centerfold	Fred Olen Ray	
1996	Body Troopers	Vibeke Idsøe	Eight-year-old Simon shrinks himself to microscopic size in order to travel through his ailing grandfather's body in search of a kidney stone.
1997	Honey, We Shrunk Ourselves	Dean Cundey	Wayne accidentally shrinks himself, his wife, his brother and his sister-in-law with his shrink ray.
2006	The Ant Bully	John A. Davis	A boy is shrunk down to the size of an ant after attacking an ant colony.
2009	Monsters vs. Aliens	Conrad Vernon, Rob Letterman	After nearly being struck by a 'quantonium' meteor on her wedding day, Susan Murphy grows to a height of 49 feet 11 inches and is given the name Ginormica.
2010	Tooth Fairy	Michael Lembeck	A hockey player is forced to work as a tooth fairy.
2010	Despicable Me	Chris Renaud, Pierre Coffin	In an effort to become one of the greatest villains of all time, Gru uses a shrink ray to steal the Moon.
2012	Attack of the 50 Foot Cheerleader	Kevin O'Neill	
2013	Epic	Chris Wedge	One of the main protagonists is shrunken down to help a group of people called the Leafmen prevent their forest home from being destroyed.
2015	Ant-Man	Peyton Reed	After stealing and trying on what he mistakenly believed to be a motorcycle suit, Scott Lang realizes that it is a shrinking suit and is recruited by Hank Pym to infiltrate the Avengers.
2017	Downsizing	Alexander Payne	To solve overpopulation and environmental dangers, humans are shrunken to a height of 5 inches (13 cm).
2018	Ant-Man and the Wasp	Peyton Reed	Lang helps Pym retrieve his wife from the Quantum Realm.
2018	Captain Morten and the Spider Queen	Kaspar Jancis	
2022	Turning Red	Domee Shi	13-year old Meilin Lee discovers that she can transform into a giant anthropomorphic red panda when she expresses intense emotions.
2023	Ant-Man and the Wasp: Quantumania	Peyton Reed	
2023	Ruby Gillman, Teenage Kraken	Kirk DeMicco, Faryn Pearl	The protagonist Ruby Gillman learns that she can transform into a giant kraken when exposed to water.

== Television ==
Resizing is a recurrent theme in television programs. The list below covers television series for which resizing is central to the premise and direction of the plot and setting.

Start date	End date	Title	Creator(s)	Description
1960	1963	Joe the Little Boom Boom		After a young boy named Joe stops two youths from stealing honey from a beehive, the queen bee has her advisor shrink him to the size of an insect so he can visit her kingdom.
1968	1968	Micro Ventures	Hanna-Barbera Productions	In each episode, Professor Carter and his two teenage kids use a shrinking machine to shrink themselves and their dune buggy and explore and experience the world from the perspective of an insect.
1968	1969	Fantastic Voyage		Characters go on missions in which they board a submarine and get miniaturized.
1969	1969	The Secret Service	Gerry and Sylvia Anderson	Father Stanley Unwin's missions involve frequent use of the Minimiser, a device capable of shrinking people and objects to facilitate covert operations.
1980	1981	Mighty Man and Yukk	Ruby-Spears Productions	A millionaire uses a machine to reduce himself to a few inches in height and give himself superpowers, taking on his role as Mighty Man.
1980	1981	The Wonderful Adventures of Nils		
2008	2013	The New Adventures of Nanoboy		A 9-year-old boy named Oscar solves issues by shrinking down to microscopic size and saving the day as a superhero named Nanoboy.
2009	2014	Grandpa in My Pocket	Mellie Buse and Jan Page	A grandfather uses a "shrinking cap" that, when worn, reduces his height to around 4 inches and gives him the ability to run very fast and use toys as vehicles.
2010	2018	Adventure Time	Pendleton Ward	Jake the Dog is able to magically stretch or shrink himself to various sizes.
2012	2016	Tree Fu Tom	Daniel Bays	In each episode, Tom uses a power belt to shrink to insect size and fly into a tree to enter the world of Treetopolis.
2017	2017	Ant-Man		
2018	–	Polly Pocket		The eponymous character Polly uses a magical locket to shrink herself and her friends down to tiny sizes.
2021	–	Gabby's Dollhouse	Traci Paige Johnson, Jennifer Twomey	
2021	2022	Kid Cosmic	Craig McCracken	One of the main characters, Rosa (also known as La Nina Gigantica), can enlarge herself to a height of 40 feet when she uses the blue Stone of Power.

== Video games ==
Year	Title	Developer(s)	Description
1985	Super Mario Bros.	Nintendo R&D4	One powerup, when obtained, causes Mario to double in height and gain the ability to break bricks above him.
1987	Palace of Magic	Martyn R. Howard	The player character finds himself in a palace after being shrunk by an evil wizard.
1989	Incredible Shrinking Sphere	Foursfield	Players control a ball that can change size in order to tackle traps in mazes.
1993	Harley's Humongous Adventure	Visual Concepts	A man in a green suit shrinks himself down to the size of a bar of soap.
2004	Ben's Game	Eric Johnston	A child patient is shrunk to microscopic size and goes on adventures inside their own body to collect seven shields against symptom of chemotherapy, each guarded by a monster representing their respective symptoms.
2004	The Legend of Zelda: The Minish Cap	Capcom, Flagship	Using portals throughout the world, Link can shrink down to "Minish size".
2006	Tasty Planet	Dingo Games	Players control a grey goo which gets bigger when it eats items that are smaller than it. Size change continued to play a role in the other games in the series.
	NanoMission	PlayGen	In the game's NanoScaling module, players can have their character shrink or grow to the size of items they select in order to see them in perspective.
2008	Army Men: Soldiers of Misfortune	Big Blue Bubble	Players assume the role of Private Timmy Reynolds, who shrinks down to participate in a war amongst toy soldiers.
2014	LittleBigPlanet 3	Sumo Digital	One of the player characters, Toggle, can switch between two sizes.
2019	Superliminal	Pillow Castle Games	Players can rescale objects by picking them up and moving them around.
2022	Grounded	Obsidian Entertainment	Four protagonists are shrunk and must survive in a backyard.

== See also ==
- List of films featuring miniature people
- Shrink ray
- Thru the Mirror
