= 1956 in science fiction =

The year 1956 was marked, in science fiction, by the following events.

== Births and deaths ==
=== Births ===
- K. A. Applegate
- Gillian Bradshaw
- Simon Brown
- Aleksandr Bushkov (d. 2025)
- Jack Campbell
- Storm Constantine (d. 2021)
- Hugh Cook (d. 2008)
- Nabil Farouk (d. 2020)
- Richard Foss
- Mary Gentle
- Rick Kennett
- Tom Kratman
- Jean-Marc Ligny
- Ian R. MacLeod
- R. M. Meluch
- Robert A. Metzger
- Brian Plante
- Robert Reed
- Shauna S. Roberts
- Joan Slonczewski
- Sonny Whitelaw
- Jack Womack

=== Deaths ===
- Archibald Low (b. 1888)
- Vladimir Obruchev (b. 1863)
- Bob Olsen (b. 1884)
- Fletcher Pratt (b. 1897)
- F. Orlin Tremaine (b. 1899)

== Literary releases ==
=== Serialized novels ===
- The Naked Sun by Isaac Asimov, Astounding Science Fiction (October–December), published in book form in 1957.
- The Power by Frank M. Robinson, Blue Book (March), published in book form in May.

=== Novels ===
- The City and the Stars by Arthur C. Clarke, a man questions the perfect but stagnant future city of Diaspar.
- The Crossroads of Time by Andre Norton, an agent travels between parallel worlds to prevent a catastrophic war.
- The Death of Grass by John Christopher, a global famine leads to societal collapse and desperate survival.
- Double Star by Robert A. Heinlein, an actor impersonates a politician in a complex political scheme.
- Highways in Hiding by George O. Smith, intertwines ESP, a disease that turns people to stone, and a secret society with a hidden cure.
- The Man Who Japed by Philip K. Dick, a satirical novel about rebellion in a totalitarian society.
- No Man Friday by Rex Gordon, a science fiction robinsonade set on Mars.
- The Power by Frank M. Robinson, a thriller that explores the concept of a man with the ability to control others.
- The Shrinking Man by Richard Matheson, a man battles to survive as he inexplicably shrinks in size.
- Slave Ship by Frederik Pohl, explores the psychological impact of futuristic warfare and slavery.
- Tiger! Tiger! by Alfred Bester, (Note: Republished in the US as The Stars My Destination in 1957.) a man seeks revenge across the galaxy using newfound teleportation powers.
- To Live Forever by Jack Vance, society is divided by the quest for immortality and a man's struggle against it.
- The World Jones Made by Philip K. Dick, a man who can see a year into the future grapples with his power and destiny.

=== Short stories ===
- "The Country of the Kind" by Damon Knight, The Magazine of Fantasy & Science Fiction (February).
- "The Last Question" by Isaac Asimov, Science Fiction Quarterly (November).
- "The Man Who Came Early" by Poul Anderson, The Magazine of Fantasy & Science Fiction (June).
- "The Minority Report" (novella) by Philip K. Dick, Fantastic Universe.

=== Juveniles ===
- Danny Dunn and the Anti-Gravity Paint by Raymond Abrashkin and Jay Williams, a lab mishap leads to the creation of anti-gravity paint and an unintended space voyage.
- Time for the Stars by Robert A. Heinlein (juvenile), telepathic twins communicate across vast distances during space exploration.

=== Children's books ===
- The Domes of Mars by Patrick Moore, second of a six-book series following Mission to Mars (1955).
- Stowaway to the Mushroom Planet by Eleanor Cameron, children embark on another adventure to the Mushroom Planet.

== Movies ==
Title	Director	Cast	Country	Subgenre/Notes
1984	Michael Anderson	Edmond O'Brien, Jan Sterling, Michael Redgrave, Donald Pleasence	United Kingdom	Drama
The Beast of Hollow Mountain	Edward Nassour, Ismael Rodríguez	Guy Madison, Patricia Medina, Carlos Rivas	United States	Horror Romance Thriller Western
The Black Sleep	Reginald LeBorg	Basil Rathbone, Akim Tamiroff, Herbert Rudley, Patricia Blake, Lon Chaney Jr., John Carradine, Bela Lugosi, Tor Johnson	United States	Horror
The Creature Walks Among Us	John Sherwood	Jeff Morrow, Rex Reason, Leigh Snowden	United States	Horror
Earth vs. the Flying Saucers	Fred Sears	Hugh Marlowe, Joan Taylor, Donald Curtis, Morris Ankrum	United States	Action Horror
Fire Maidens from Outer Space	Cy Roth	Anthony Dexter, Susan Shaw	United Kingdom	(Note: U.S. title: Fire Maidens of Outer Space.)
Forbidden Planet	Fred Wilcox	Walter Pidgeon, Anne Francis, Leslie Nielsen	United States	Adventure
The Gamma People	John Gilling	Paul Douglas, Eva Bartok, Leslie Phillips	United Kingdom	Drama Horror Thriller
Godzilla, King of the Monsters!	Terrell O. Morse, Ishirō Honda	Raymond Burr, Takashi Shimura, Akira Takarada, Kenji Sahara, Momoko Kochi	United States; Japan	Action Horror Kaijū
Indestructible Man	Jack Pollexfen	Lon Chaney Jr., Max Showalter, Marian Carr	United States	Crime Horror
Invasion of the Body Snatchers	Don Siegel	Kevin McCarthy, Dana Wynter, King Donovan	United States	Horror
It Conquered the World	Roger Corman	Peter Graves, Beverly Garland, Lee Van Cleef	United States	Horror
The Mole People	Virgil Vogel	John Agar, Cynthia Patrick, Hugh Beaumont, Nestor Paiva	United States	Adventure Fantasy Horror
Rodan (a.k.a. Sora no Daikaijū Radon)	Ishirō Honda	Kenji Sahara. Yumi Shirakawa, Yoshifumi Tajima	Japan	Horror Kaijū (Note: US title: Rodan! the Flying Monster.)
Satellite in the Sky	Paul Dickson	Kieron Moore, Lois Maxwell, Donald Wolfit, Bryan Forbes	United Kingdom	
UFO (a.k.a. Unidentified Flying Objects: The True Story of Flying Saucers)	Winston Jones	Tom Towers	USA	Semi-documentary / Sci fi
The Werewolf	Fred F. Sears	Don Megowan, Joyce Holden, Steven Ritch, Eleanore Tanin	United States	
World Without End	Edward Bernds	Hugh Marlowe, Nancy Gates, Rod Taylor	United States	Adventure Romance
X the Unknown	Leslie Norman	Dean Jagger, Edward Chapman, Leo McKern	United States; United Kingdom	Horror

== Awards ==
- Double Star by Robert A. Heinlein won the Hugo Award for Best Novel.

== See also ==
- 1956 in science
