= Size change in fiction =

Recurring theme in fiction in which characters or objects change size

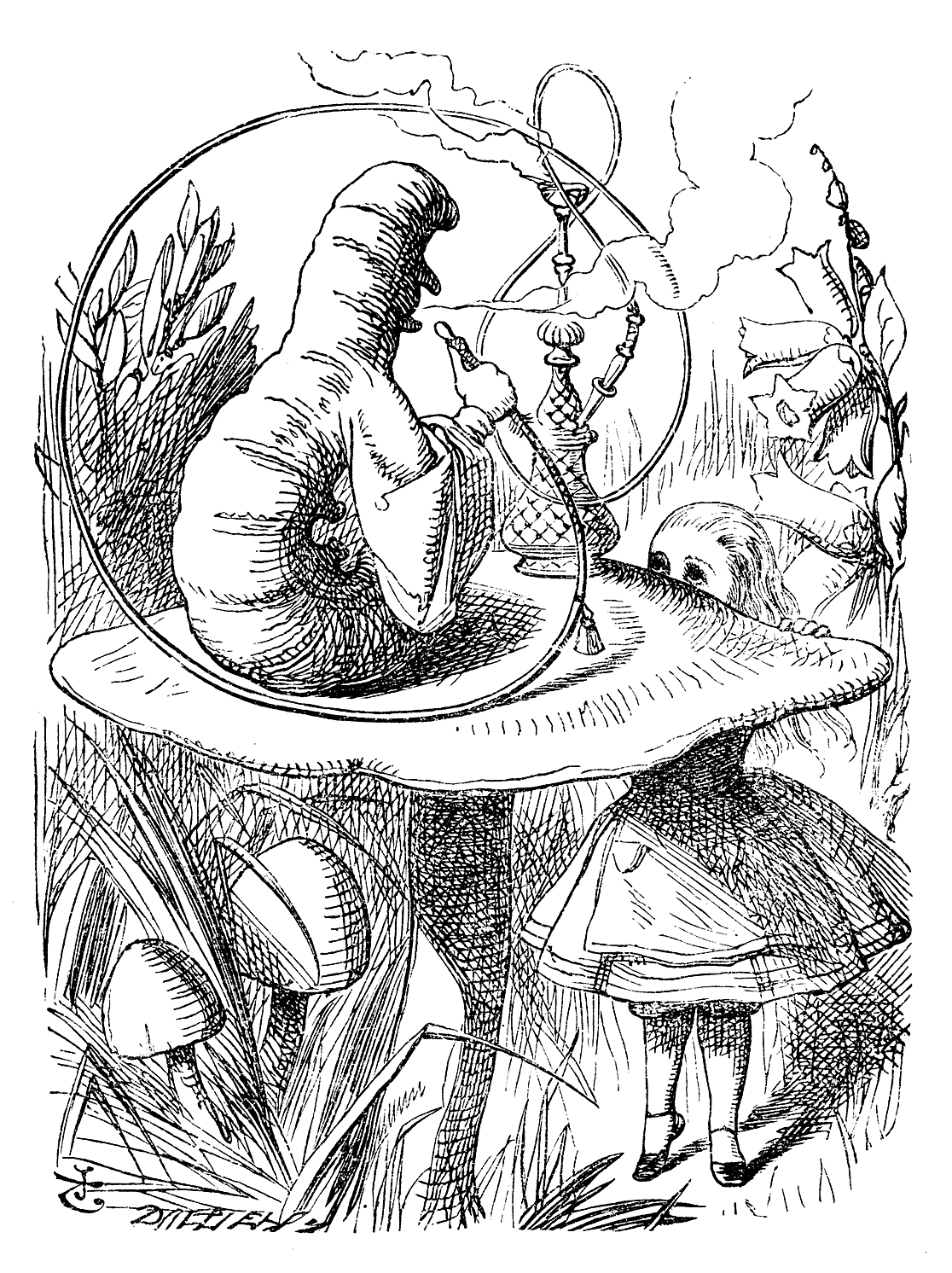
In Alice's Adventures in Wonderland (1865), protagonist Alice changes her size by eating or drinking various foods or potions.

Resizing (including miniaturization, growth, shrinking, and enlargement) is a recurring theme in speculative fiction, in particular in fairy tales, fantasy, and science fiction. Resizing is often achieved through the consumption of mushrooms or toadstools, which might have been established due to their psychedelic properties, through magic, by inherent yet-latent abilities, or by size-changing rays of ambiguous properties.

== Mythological precursors ==
=== Chinese mythology ===
In the Liezi, the giants of the Longbo Kingdom were shrunk over time as punishment by the heavenly emperor after their burning of the bones of the ao caused the Daiyu and Yuanjiao islands to sink, forcing billions of xian to evacuate their homes.

=== Hindu mythology ===
In the Ramayana, the deity Hanuman has the ability to alter his size, which he can use to enlarge himself to the size of a mountain or shrink himself down to the size of an insect.

The Bhagavata Purana mentions the story of King Kakudmi and his daughter Revati, who go to Satyaloka to ask Brahma for help deciding who Revati should marry. After waiting for a musical performance to finish, they are told by Brahma that many successions of ages have passed on Earth, so all of Kakudmi's candidates for husbands are long gone. When he and Revati return to Earth, they find that the new race of people dwelling upon it are "dwindled in stature, reduced in vigour, and enfeebled in intellect". They find Balarama, who marries Revati and shrinks her down to his size.

Along with many other texts, the Bhagavata Purana also mentions some avatars of Vishnu growing to large sizes. The legend of Matsya starting out as a tiny fish and gradually growing bigger whilst under the care of Manu is first told in the Shatapatha Brahmana. Varaha, a boar, starts out as small as a thumb and grows big enough to carry the earth on his tusks. The dwarf Vamana grows to astronomical proportions and takes three steps, liberating the three worlds from the rule of the asuras and sending King Bali to Patala after taking his third and final step. When Krishna and his friends were swallowed by Aghasura, one of the demons sent by Kamsa to kill Krishna, Krishna grew larger and larger inside of him until he burst out through the top of his head.

The tenth book and thirteenth chapter of the Devi Bhagavata Purana mentions a battle between the devas and the daitya Arunasura, during which the goddess Bhramari grew to a massive size and began to summon bees and various other insects from her hands.

In the Srimad Bhagavatam, Chitralekha shrinks Aniruddha down to the size of a doll and brings him to Usha's palace.

According to different sources, two of the eight classical siddhis are aṇimā and mahimā—the ability to shrink to the size of an atom and to expand to an infinitely large size respectively.

=== Greco-Roman literature ===
In some tellings of the myth of Tithonus, who is granted immortality but not eternal youth, his continued aging causes him to eventually become a cicada. A similar story is told about the Cumaean Sibyl in Ovid's Metamorphoses, in which her wish for longevity results in her aging body gradually shrinking, causing her to become small enough to be kept in a jar. The Metamorphoses also includes a story in which Athena transforms Arachne into a spider such that "her whole body became tiny."

According to Porphyry, the love god Eros grows when he is near his brother Anteros, but shrinks back down to his previous small form when they are apart.

=== Irish mythology ===
According to one variant of a story pertaining to the goddess Áine, her son Gerald FitzGerald has the ability to change his size, which he does when he shrinks himself down in order to jump into a bottle.

== Modern depictions ==
In one story narrated in the Norske Folkeeventyr, a tiny character called Doll i' the Grass accidentally falls into a body of water and ends up normal-sized when she is brought out by a merman.

In Lewis Carroll's Alice's Adventures in Wonderland (1865), the protagonist Alice grows or shrinks as she eats foodstuffs or drinks potions.

The first motion picture to depict a character changing size is Georges Méliès' 1901 trick film The Dwarf and the Giant, in which Méliès portrays a man who splits into two differently-sized counterparts.

=== In science fiction ===
The novel The Food of the Gods and How It Came to Earth by H. G. Wells describes a kind of food that can accelerate and extend the growth process, which causes great upheaval when it is introduced to the world. Though one of Wells' lesser-known works, many of the features of the novel have been incorporated into other works, including a film adaptation.

One of the earliest lengthy depictions of size change in popular printed fiction was the 1890 adventure/science-fiction novel by Polish scientific researcher and author Erazm Majewski, Doktor Muchołapski. Fantastyczne przygody w świecie owadów (Doctor Flycatcher. The Fantastic Adventures in the World of Insects); it was translated into several languages, including Czech and Russian, and was later referenced in another adventure/science fiction novel about size change, В Стране Дремучих Трав (In the Land of Dense Grasses), written in 1948 by Russian author Vladimir Bragin.

Other early works in the science fiction genre to feature characters changing size include the 1936 novella He Who Shrank by Henry Hasse, as well as the 1936 Metro-Goldwyn-Mayer film The Devil-Doll and the 1940 Paramount Pictures film Dr. Cyclops.

A year after its publication in 1956, the novel The Shrinking Man by Richard Matheson was adapted into the Universal Pictures film The Incredible Shrinking Man, which was followed by The Incredible Shrinking Woman in 1981.

Size alteration was also a common motif of many films directed by Bert I. Gordon, including Beginning of the End, Attack of the Puppet People, Village of the Giants, and an adaptation of H. G. Wells' The Food of the Gods. Other science fiction and horror films released in the late 1950s and 1960s with enlargement or shrinking as a major plot element include Tarantula, The Phantom Planet, Fantastic Voyage (which was adapted into an animated television series of the same name), and Attack of the 50 Foot Woman—which got a remake in 1993 starring Daryl Hannah and served as inspiration for similar plot elements in films like The 30 Foot Bride of Candy Rock, Attack of the 60 Foot Centerfold, Monsters vs. Aliens and Attack of the 50 Foot Cheerleader.

The year 1989 saw the release of Disney's Honey, I Shrunk the Kids, which grossed $222 million (equivalent to $545.67 million in 2023) at the box office worldwide and spawned a media franchise consisting of two sequels, Honey, I Blew Up the Kid and Honey, We Shrunk Ourselves, as well as a television series and a few theme park attractions, including Honey, I Shrunk the Audience.

In comics, film and television, some superheroes and supervillains can alter their size at will, either through an innate ability (as is the case for Galactus and Kamala Khan) or by technological means (as is the case for Ant-Man).

== See also ==
- Shapeshifting
- Square–cube law – a mathematical principle that explains why resizing is not possible in real life
- List of works of fiction about size change
- Macrophilia
