= Shrinking Man =

- The Shrinking Man, a 1956 novel
- The Incredible Shrinking Man, 1957 film adaptation

== See also ==
- The Incredible Melting Man, a 1977 film
- The Incredible Shrinking Woman, a 1981 film
