= Futuria Fantasia =

1939–1940 sci-fi fanzine by Ray Bradbury

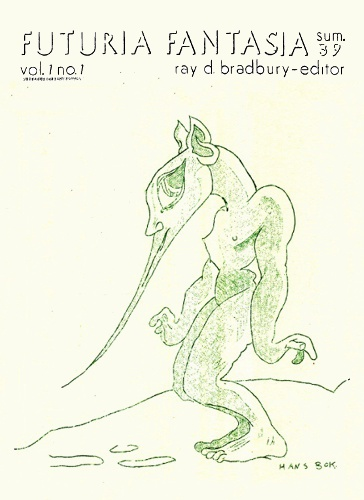
- Cover of the first issue
- Editor: Ray Bradbury
- Categories: Science fiction
- First issue: 1939
- Final issue: 1940
- Language: English

Futuria Fantasia was an American science fiction fanzine created by Ray Bradbury in 1938, when he was 18 years old. Though only four issues of the fanzine were published, its list of contributors included Hannes Bok, Forrest J. Ackerman, Henry Kuttner, Damon Knight, and Robert A. Heinlein.

== Background ==
Since the 1930s, fanzines have been an integral part of science fiction fandom. The earliest fanzines were often produced or sponsored by science fiction clubs and served as a platform for group members to circulate nonfiction essays, science fiction stories and reviews, and reflections on fandom itself. Such is the case with Futuria Fantasia, which began as a project aimed at members of the Los Angeles Science Fiction League (LASFL). Ray Bradbury joined the LASFL in 1937 and soon became a prominent member of the club. In 1938, at the urging of fellow LASFL member Forrest J. Ackerman, Bradbury conceived the idea for his own magazine, and with Ackerman's support, Bradbury was able to convince the LASFL to fund his new editorial project.

== Issues ==
The first issue was published in June 1939, receiving "fairly good feedback from local and long-distance subscribers." Indeed, Henry Hasse, a pulp writer from Seattle, wrote to Bradbury for a copy of the issue, and at Bradbury's prompting, offered feedback on the young editor's first attempt at publication. Hasse would go on to contribute to the second and third issue under the pseudonym Foo E. Onya. The covers of the first issue—and all subsequent issues—were illustrated by Hannes Bok, who would become famous for his work on pulp and science fiction magazines.

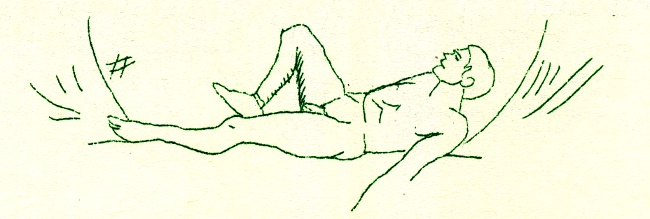
Bok's illustration for "The Pendulum"

The second issue, "hastily printed three weeks ahead" of schedule, contains more than a few errors, including references to three articles that were dropped prior to publication. Yet Futuria Fantasia no. 2 also contains Bradbury's anonymous story "The Pendulum", which became the basis for his first paid, professional piece.

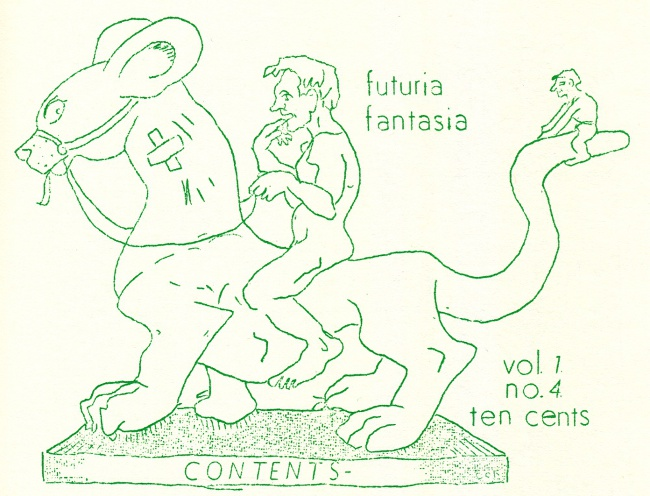
The illustration for the table of contents of Futuria Fantasia no. 4

By the third issue, Bradbury was struggling to finance his project. Though every issue had been priced at a dime per copy, "each issue of 100 could defray only ten dollars of the twenty-five-dollar production cost". Furthermore, LASFL member Russel Hodgkins cut the fanzine's funding, forcing Bradbury to search for a new source of capital. Though Bradbury was eventually able to secure enough money to produce a fourth issue, it would be his last.

Despite his depleted funds, Bradbury was able to enhance both the quality and layout of the fourth and final issue. In addition to a table of contents, the issue features an editor's page with a masthead. Along with stories by Henry Kuttner and Damon Knight, the issue also includes the story "Heil!,” attributed to Lyle Monroe but actually written by Robert A. Heinlein. "Heil!" remains one of Heinlein's "hardest…titles to locate in the original printing."

== Awards ==
Beginning with the 1996 Worldcon, the World Science Fiction Society created the concept of "Retro Hugos", in which the Hugo Award could be retroactively awarded for years 50, 75, or 100 years before the current year, if no awards were originally given that year. In 2016, at MidAmeriCon II (the 74th World Science Fiction Convention), Futuria Fantasia was retroactively awarded a Retro Hugo for Best Fanzine for the year 1940.

== Select contents ==
- Futuria Fantasia, Summer 1939, vol. 1 no. 1
  - Contents
    - "The Record", Forrest J. Ackerman
    - "Don't Get Technatal", Ray Bradbury (as Ron Reynolds)
    - "Thought and Space", Ray D' Bradbury
- Futuria Fantasia, Fall 1939, vol. 1 no. 2
  - Contents
    - "Lost Soul", Henry Hasse
    - "The Truth About Goldfish", Henry Kuttner
    - "The Pendulum", Ray Bradbury
- Futuria Fantasia, Winter 1940, vol. 1 no. 3
  - Contents
    - "Aw G’wan!", Henry Hasse
    - "The Best Ways to Get Around", Ross Rocklyn
- Futuria Fantasia, vol. 1 no. 4
  - Contents
    - "Heil!", Lyle Monroe

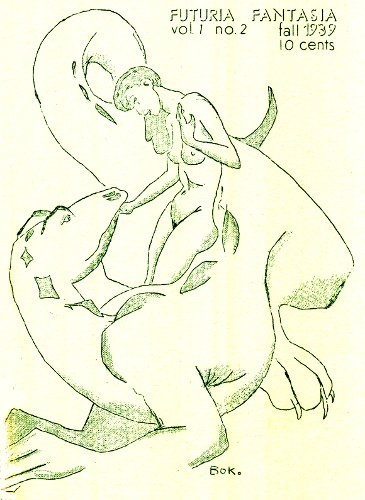
The cover of the second issue

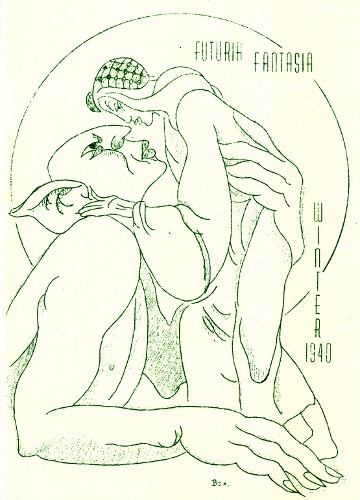
The cover of the third issue

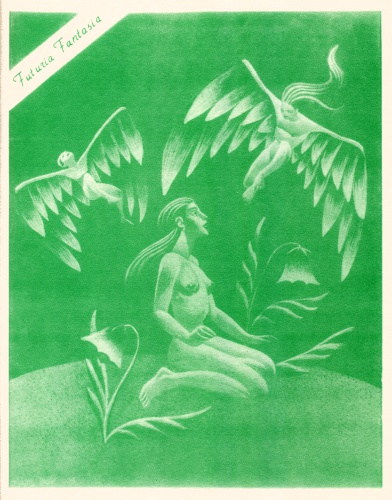
The cover of the fourth issue

== Contributor pseudonyms ==
- Forrest J. Ackerman
  - One Who Should Know Better
  - H.V.B.
- Robert A. Heinlein
  - Lyle Monroe
- Hannes Bok
  - Antony Corvais
  - Guy Armory
- Ray Bradbury
  - Ron Reynold
  - OMEGA
  - Doug Rogers
- Henry Hasse
  - Foo E. Onya

== Facsimile editions of Futuria Fantasia ==
- 2007. Los Angeles: Graham. ISBN 9780940941106.
