= Klaatu (The Day the Earth Stood Still) =

Character in The Day the Earth Stood Still

- The Day the Earth Stood Still character
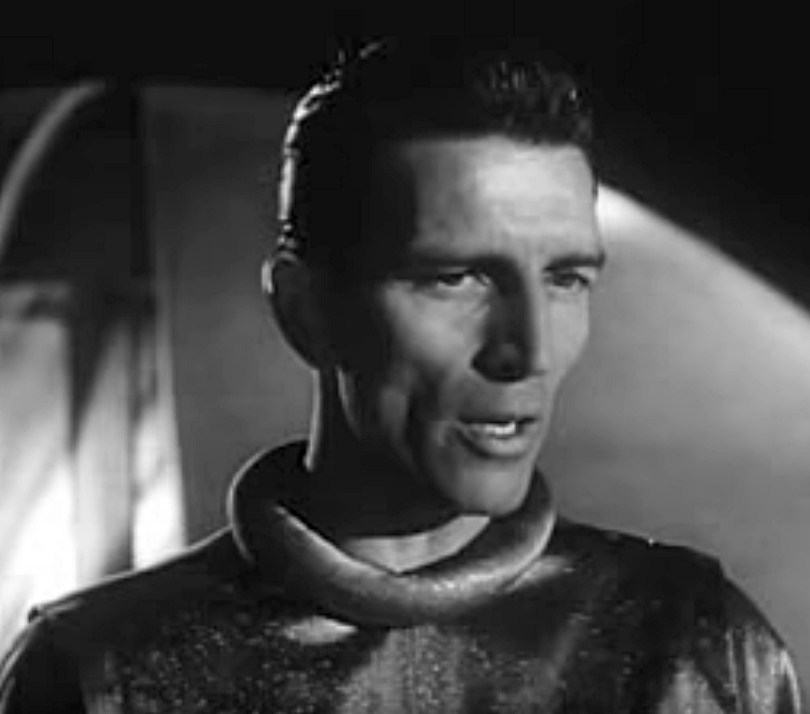
- Michael Rennie as Klaatu in The Day the Earth Stood Still (1951)
- First appearance: "Farewell to the Master"
- Created by: Harry Bates
- Portrayed by: Michael Rennie (1951); Keanu Reeves (2008)

In-universe information
- Alias: Mr. Carpenter
- Species: Humanoid alien
- Origin: Mars

Klaatu (/klæˈtuː/) is a fictional humanoid alien character best known from his appearances in the 1951 science fiction film The Day the Earth Stood Still and its 2008 remake. The character of Klaatu gained popularity partly due to the iconic phrase "Klaatu barada nikto!" associated with the character. The character inspired the name of the band Klaatu, which became popular in the 1970s.

== Appearances ==
=== Farewell to the Master (1940) ===
Klaatu was introduced in a short story by author Harry Bates in the October 1940 issue of Astounding Science Fiction. In it, Klaatu appears only briefly before being killed. After arriving in a spaceship and introducing himself and his looming robot companion Gnut, he is shot dead. The rest of the story follows as the human protagonist, Sutherland, tries to help Gnut recreate Klaatu from an audio recording.

=== The Day the Earth Stood Still (1951) ===
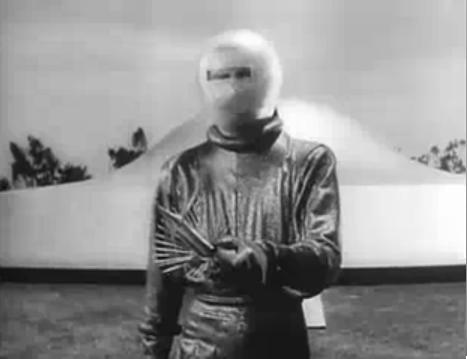
Klaatu, shortly after landing on Earth

In the film The Day the Earth Stood Still, Klaatu, portrayed by Michael Rennie, arrives in Washington, D.C. in a flying saucer alongside Gort, a robotic companion. Klaatu presents a device to the American President for studying life on other planets. However, a soldier misinterprets Klaatu's actions and shoots him. In response, Gort destroys the surrounding artillery to protect Klaatu.

Klaatu is taken to a hospital, where he quickly recovers. Realizing that other nations may not be willing to meet him, he assumes the alias "Carpenter" based on the name found on his clothes and suitcase. He befriends Bobby Benson, a boy staying at the same boarding house with his widowed mother, Helen Benson, played by Patricia Neal. Klaatu visits Professor Barnhardt, a renowned scientist portrayed by Sam Jaffe. When Klaatu/Carpenter is brought before Barnhardt, the professor agrees to gather scientists from all nations. He asks Klaatu for a demonstration of power to show the potential threat the extraterrestrial alliance poses if Earth disrupts the peace in space. Klaatu neutralizes electric power worldwide for 30 minutes, except in places where lives would be endangered, such as hospitals and airplanes in flight. This action is perceived as an act of war.

Betrayed by Mrs. Benson's suitor, Klaatu is fatally shot by the U.S. Army. However, before dying, he instructs Mrs. Benson to deliver the message "Klaatu barada nikto!" to Gort, saving her life. Gort retrieves Klaatu's body and revives him. In a gathering of scientists, Klaatu gives an ultimatum: Earth can join other spacefaring worlds, where peace is maintained through a powerful force of robots similar to Gort, or face destruction. Klaatu departs following his declaration.

=== The Day the Earth Stood Still (2008) ===
Keanu Reeves as Klaatu in The Day the Earth Stood Still (2008)

The 2008 remake of The Day the Earth Stood Still, features Keanu Reeves as Klaatu and Jennifer Connelly as Helen Benson. In this version, it is revealed that Klaatu's biology was altered to assume a human form using DNA obtained in 1928. Initially captured by the military, Klaatu manages to escape with Helen's assistance. He meets a man named Mr. Wu, who is actually another member of Klaatu's alien race in disguise. The two plan to destroy humanity to prevent the destruction of the planet, while preserving animal species in vessels similar to the concept of Noah's Ark. Klaatu activates Gort to destroy humanity.

Throughout the course of the film, Klaatu spends time with Helen and her stepson, Jacob, and engages in conversations with Professor Barnhardt. After observing humanity, Klaatu decides to sacrifice his physical form to halt Gort's destructive actions. His spaceship then departs from Earth. In Reeves' portrayal, Klaatu exhibits minimal emotion, explaining that he is an alien entity residing within a human body. Consequently, he lacks the natural gestures and expressions of humans, appearing more stoic and detached. The filmmakers aimed to depict Klaatu as distinctly different, with a focused and unique perspective on the world. Unlike the original Klaatu, who was unfamiliar with Earth, the remake introduces the presence of another member of Klaatu's race who had been on Earth for decades prior to the events of the film.

== Analysis ==
In the 1951 film, Klaatu does not explicitly describe himself as a Martian but describes his journey to Earth traversing 250 million miles (400 million kilometers), the approximate distance between Earth and Mars when the planets are farthest apart from one another. He also says that humans and his people are "neighbors" and a newspaper headline shown in the film reads "'Man from Mars' Escapes from Army Hospital!"

Science fiction scholar Gary Westfahl further believes that the 1951 version of Klaatu represented "a ubiquitous trope in science fiction", a Martian who serves as a kind of parent for humanity, in this case a positive role model with wisdom and stern warnings to share. Westfahl thus concludes that Klaatu is a Martian both textually and intertextually. Discussing allegory, Theodore James Sherman remarks the 1951 Klaatu is also a notable example of Christian symbolism in science fiction, the alien being "significantly renamed Mr. Carpenter" (compare the unknown years of Jesus), dying and being reborn as part of a mission to save humanity, and undergoing his universal redemption in significant part through personal relationships with common people.
