= Adventures in Time and Space =

American anthology edited by Raymond J. Healy and J. Francis McComas

- Dust-jacket from the first edition
- Editors: Raymond J. Healy and J. Francis McComas
- Cover artist: George Salter
- Language: English
- Genre: Science fiction
- Publisher: Random House
- Publication date: 1946
- Publication place: United States
- Media type: Print (hardback)
- Pages: 997 pp

Adventures in Time and Space is an American anthology of science fiction stories edited by Raymond J. Healy and J. Francis McComas and published in 1946 by Random House. A second edition was also published in 1946 that eliminated the last five stories. A Modern Library edition (Famous Science-Fiction Stories: Adventures in Time and Space) was issued in 1957. When it was re-released in 1975 by Ballantine Books, Analog book reviewer Lester del Rey referred to it as a book he often gave to people in order to turn them onto the genre. It is now once again out of print.

The book and A Treasury of Science Fiction were among the only science fiction hardcover books from large, mainstream publishers before about 1950. The large (997 page) anthology collected numerous stories from the Golden Age of Science Fiction, which had originally appeared in pulp magazines (mostly Astounding Science Fiction) and are now regarded as classics of science fiction. According to Frederik Pohl, it was "A colossal achievement...the book that started the science-fiction publishing industry!" In 1954, Anthony Boucher described it as "the one anthology unarguably essential to every reader." In Astounding readers' surveys in both 1952 and 1956, it was rated the best science fiction book ever published.

== Contents ==
- Robert A. Heinlein, "Requiem" (1940)
- Don A. Stuart (pen-name of John W. Campbell, Jr.), "Forgetfulness" (1937)
- Lester del Rey, "Nerves" (1942)
- P. Schuyler Miller, "The Sands of Time" (1937)
- Lewis Padgett (pen-name of Henry Kuttner and C. L. Moore), "The Proud Robot" (1943)
- A. E. van Vogt, "Black Destroyer" (1939)
- Eric Frank Russell, "Symbiotica" (1943)
- Raymond Z. Gallun, "Seeds of the Dusk" (1938)
- Lee Gregor (pen-name of Milton A. Rothman) (co-written with Frederik Pohl), "Heavy Planet" (1939)
- Lewis Padgett (pen-name of Henry Kuttner and C. L. Moore), "Time Locker" (1943)
- Cleve Cartmill, "The Link" (1942)
- Maurice G. Hugi (possibly co-written by Eric Frank Russell), "Mechanical Mice" (1941)
- Willy Ley, "V-2: Rocket Cargo Ship" (essay) (1945)
- Alfred Bester, "Adam and No Eve" (1941)
- Isaac Asimov, "Nightfall" (1941)
- Harry Bates, "A Matter of Size" (1934)
- P. Schuyler Miller, "As Never Was" (1944)
- Anthony Boucher, "Q. U. R." (1943)
- Don A. Stuart (pen-name of John W. Campbell, Jr.), "Who Goes There?" (1938)
- Robert A. Heinlein, "The Roads Must Roll" (1940)
- A. E. van Vogt, "Asylum" (1942)
- Ross Rocklynne, "Quietus" (1940)
- Lewis Padgett (pen-name of Henry Kuttner and C. L. Moore), "The Twonky" (1942)
- A. M. Phillips (Alexander M. Phillips), "Time-Travel Happens!" (essay about the Moberly-Jourdain incident) (1939)
- Robert Moore Williams, "Robot's Return" (1938)
- L. Sprague de Camp, "The Blue Giraffe" (1939)
- Webb Marlowe (pen name of J. Francis McComas), "Flight Into Darkness" (1943)
- A. E. van Vogt, "The Weapons Shop" (1942) (variant of "The Weapon Shop")
- Harry Bates, "Farewell to the Master" (1940)
- R. DeWitt Miller, "Within the Pyramid" (1937)
- Henry Hasse, "He Who Shrank" (1936)
- Anson MacDonald (pen-name of Robert A. Heinlein), "By His Bootstraps" (1941)
- Fredric Brown, "The Star Mouse" (1942)
- Raymond F. Jones, "Correspondence Course" (1945)
- S. Fowler Wright, "Brain" (1932)
