= Genius of the Species =

1954 short story by Reginald Bretnor

"Genius of the Species" is a science fiction short story by American writer Reginald Bretnor. It was first published (under the name "R. Bretnor") in the 1954 anthology 9 Tales of Space and Time edited by Raymond Healy.

== Plot summary ==
The story is set in the Soviet Union where a rat problem is getting out of control due to the laziness of cats. This problem is solved by a government program to use artificial means to raise the intelligence of cats to an IQ of 20.2 so that they can be taught Marxism and subsequently realize catching rats is for the greater good. However, due to a calculation error on part of the scientist responsible for this program, the cats end up with an IQ of 202 rather than 20.2. With this superior intellect cats become the dominant species in the Communist world.
