= Machines That Think =

1984 compilation of 29 science fiction stories

- First edition cover
- Editors: Isaac Asimov, Martin H. Greenberg, Patricia S. Warrick
- Publisher: Holt, Rinehart, and Winston
- Publication date: 1984

Machines That Think is a compilation of 29 science fiction stories probing the scientific, spiritual, and moral facets of computers and robots and speculating on their future. It was edited by Isaac Asimov, Martin H. Greenberg, and Patricia S. Warrick.

Published in 1984 by Holt, Rinehart, and Winston, it features a foreword by Asimov, the celebrated creator of the Three Laws of Robotics. (At five stories, Asimov's contributions dominate the book's contents.) Machines That Think was reprinted in 1992 by Wings Books as War with the Robots. However, one story — "I Have No Mouth, and I Must Scream" by Harlan Ellison — was removed.

Each story has introductory notes by Warrick, author of The Cybernetic Imagination in Science Fiction (1981), explaining the significance of the story in the context of science fiction's evolution of ideas concerning artificial intelligence. This anthology is a companion piece to that non-fiction book, providing the source material upon which Warrick's analysis is based.

== Contents ==
Title	Author	Originally published
Moxon’s Master	Ambrose Bierce	ss San Francisco Examiner Apr 16, 1899
The Lost Machine	John Wyndham (as John Beynon Harris)	nv Amazing Apr ’32
Rex	Harl Vincent	ss Astounding Jun ’34
Robbie [“Strange Playfellow”]	Isaac Asimov	ss Super Science Stories Sep ’40
Farewell to the Master	Harry Bates	nv Astounding Oct ’40
Robot’s Return	Robert Moore Williams	ss Astounding Sep ’38
Though Dreamers Die	Lester del Rey	nv Astounding Feb ’44
Fulfillment	A. E. van Vogt	nv New Tales of Space and Time, ed. Raymond J. Healy, Holt, 1951
Runaround [Mike Donovan (Robot)]	Isaac Asimov	nv Astounding Mar ’42
I Have No Mouth, and I Must Scream	Harlan Ellison	ss If Mar ’67
The Evitable Conflict [Susan Calvin (Robot)]	Isaac Asimov	nv Astounding Jun ’50
A Logic Named Joe	Murray Leinster (as Will F. Jenkins)	ss Astounding Mar ’46
Sam Hall	Poul Anderson	nv Astounding Aug ’53
I Made You	Walter M. Miller, Jr.	ss Astounding Mar ’54
Triggerman	J. F. Bone	ss Astounding Dec ’58
War with the Robots	Harry Harrison	nv Science Fiction Adventures (UK) #27 ’62
Evidence [Susan Calvin (Robot)]	Isaac Asimov	ss Astounding Sep ’46
2066: Election Day	Michael Shaara	ss Astounding Dec ’56
If There Were No Benny Cemoli	Philip K. Dick	nv Galaxy Dec ’63
The Monkey Wrench	Gordon R. Dickson	ss Astounding Aug ’51
Dial “F” for Frankenstein	Arthur C. Clarke	ss Playboy Jan ’65
The Macauley Circuit	Robert Silverberg	ss Fantastic Universe Aug ’56
Judas	John Brunner	ss Dangerous Visions, ed. Harlan Ellison, Garden City, NY: Doubleday, 1967
Answer	Fredric Brown	vi Angels and Spaceships, Dutton, 1954
The Electric Ant	Philip K. Dick	ss F&SF Oct ’69
The Bicentennial Man	Isaac Asimov	nv Stellar #2, ed. Judy-Lynn del Rey, Ballantine, 1976
Long Shot	Vernor Vinge	ss Analog Aug ’72
Alien Stones	Gene Wolfe	nv Orbit 11, ed. Damon Knight, G.P. Putnam’s, 1972
Starcrossed	George Zebrowski	ss Eros in Orbit, ed. Joseph Elder, Trident, 1973

== See also ==
- Isaac Asimov bibliography (chronological)
