= Farewell to the Master =

Novelette by Harry Bates

- Short story by Harry Bates
- Country: USA
- Language: English
- Genre: Science fiction

Publication
- Published in: Astounding Science Fiction
- Publication type: Magazine
- Publication date: October 1940

"Farewell to the Master" is a science fiction novelette by American writer Harry Bates. It was first published in Astounding Science Fiction in October 1940. The story originally featured three illustrations by American artist Frank Kramer. The novelette was loosely adapted for the film The Day the Earth Stood Still (1951).

== Plot summary ==
The story is told from the viewpoint of Cliff Sutherland, a freelance picture reporter, who is present when a mysterious "curving ovoid" ship suddenly appears on the grounds of the United States Capitol in Washington, D.C. Two days later, "visitors from the Unknown" emerge: a "god-like" person in human form and an 8-foot (2.44 m) tall robot made of green metal. The former only manages to state "I am Klaatu and this is Gnut" before he is shot and killed by a lunatic. Klaatu is buried nearby. In the days that follow, Gnut remains motionless, while laboratories and a museum are built around it and the ship. Both prove impervious to the investigations of scientists.

Sutherland discovers that the robot enters the ship each night when no one is watching, emerging to resume its position for the day. Gnut is aware of the reporter, but ignores him. After several odd encounters, Sutherland informs the world what he has learned. Gnut is encased in "glasstex", finally forcing the robot's hand. It breaks out, unaffected by all attempts to destroy it, picks up Sutherland and travels to the mausoleum containing Klaatu's corpse. It opens the tomb and takes a recording of Klaatu's voice stored there. It then returns and goes inside the ship.

Sutherland daringly boards the ship before the entrance closes and learns that the robot is working on a way to create a copy of Klaatu from an audio recording of his greeting. However, the new Klaatu is flawed, because the recording is imperfect, and he dies soon after speaking with the reporter. Sutherland then suggests retrieving the original recording device to study it and discover how to compensate for its imperfections. Gnut eagerly adopts this idea. Sutherland arranges for the equipment to be brought to it. As the robot prepares to depart, Sutherland impresses upon it the need to tell its master, the Klaatu yet to come, that his death was a terrible accident. Gnut replies, "You misunderstand, I am the master."

== Adaptations ==
The novelette was used as the basis for the 1951 film The Day the Earth Stood Still and its 2008 remake. In 1973, the story was adapted by Marvel Comics for its Worlds Unknown series; according to Gizmodo, the 1973 adaptation was more faithful to the original story than was the 1951 film. In 1976, Arthur Tofte wrote and published the novel The Day the Earth Stood Still (Scholastic Book Services [TK-3438], ISBN 978-0590103343) as an expansion of the original Harry Bates story.

== Anthologies ==
"Farewell to the Master" appears in the following science fiction anthologies:

- Adventures in Time and Space (1946), edited by Raymond J. Healy and J. Francis McComas.
- Isaac Asimov Presents The Great SF Stories 2 (1940) (1979), edited by Isaac Asimov and Martin H. Greenberg.
- They Came From Outer Space: 12 Classic Science Fiction Tales That Became Major Motion Pictures (1981), edited by Jim Wynorski.
- Machines That Think: The Best Science Fiction Stories About Robots and Computers (1984), edited by Isaac Asimov, Martin H. Greenberg, and Patricia S. Warrick. (Reprinted as War with the Robots in 1992.)
- Isaac Asimov's Wonderful Worlds of Science Fiction # 9: Robots (1989), edited by Isaac Asimov, Martin H. Greenberg, and Charles G. Waugh.
- Reel Future (1994), edited by Forrest J. Ackerman and Jean Stine.
