= Frank Fenton (writer) =

American writer (1903–1971)

Frank E. Fenton
- Born: Frank Edgington Fenton; February 13, 1903; Liverpool, England
- Died: August 23, 1971 (aged 68); Los Angeles, California
- Spouse(s): June Martel (1941-1943); Mary Jane Hodge (1945-1957)

Frank Edgington Fenton (February 13, 1903 – August 23, 1971) was an American writer of screenplays, short stories, magazine articles, and novels.

== Working writer ==
In the fall of 1934, Fenton co-wrote an original story, "Dinky," with John Fante, which they soon sold to Warner Bros. Studios on the strength of the latter's exaggerated resume. Within five years, Fenton's partner would write the novel, Ask the Dust, but at the time he was just another fledgling screenwriter and novelist. In 1935, Fenton began working with another friend with writing ambitions. Lynn Root, an acting protégé of Antoinette Perry, had four Broadway roles under his belt, and the two chose to collaborate on a play of their own.

"Stork Mad" premiered at Broadway's Ambassador Theater on September 30, 1936. The show, which starred the comically taciturn Percy Kilbride, met with tepid reviews and closed after five performances. The two wrote one other play, "It's a Cinch," which remained un-produced. But the pair reworked "Stork Mad" and shopped it to Twentieth Century-Fox, who bought it as a vehicle for child-star Jane Withers.

Following their initial success on juvenile scripts for Withers and others, the two expanded into screwball comedy (Woman Chases Man, Keep Smiling), intrigue (International Settlement and While New York Sleeps) and happy hokum (Down on the Farm). They also provided two scripts for both the Saint (The Saint in London and The Saint Takes Over) and Falcon (The Gay Falcon and A Date with the Falcon) series pictures. Both series starred George Sanders.

From 1937 to 1946, Fenton and Root partnered on twenty-one film projects for Twentieth Century-Fox, Goldwyn, RKO and MGM.

In 1938, Fenton branched out into magazine writing, penning a total of nine short stories for Collier's in just over a two-year period (see "Short Stories" in "Selected bibliography" below). He also wrote what many consider to be a classic (and satirically biting) look at the way "original stories" and screenplays were produced in Hollywood in an article for The American Mercury. During these years, Fenton could be found in one of three primary places: behind his typewriter, out on the town with his writer friends (often in the back room of Musso & Frank's restaurant on Hollywood Boulevard), or on a golf course.

== Novelist ==
On July 29, 1942, Fenton's debut novel, "A Place in the Sun," was published by Random House to positive reaction on both coasts. This from The New York Times:

Fenton's [book] is notable for its sensitive portrayal of a young man who lived with the inferiority of a physical handicap. [He] does a masterly job of balancing the forces which molded the character of Rob Andrews...[and] he succeeds in giving the story the glow of human fulfillment.

Out west, the Los Angeles Times critic had this to say:

Rob Andrews is a cripple, but he is also an everyman struggling to find his role in living. But the symbol never obscures the story. This does not follow a pat pattern. It is a strange and powerful tale, with deep tragedy, groping for meaning, and many scenes of lyrical beauty. There's humor in it too...Mr. Fenton's narrative is as absorbing as it is meaningful.

Over the next few years, others continued to champion the novel. San Francisco book critic Joseph Henry Jackson included a chapter from the novel in Continent's End, his 1944 anthology of California writing. In 1946, Carey McWilliams, one of the most prolific, talented and influential of all western writers of non-fiction, placed Fenton's novel in high company in his remarkable (and still in print) Southern California Country: An Island on the Land:

No region in the United States has been more extensively and intensively reported, of recent years, than Southern California...And yet, offhand, I can think of only four novels that suggest what Southern California is really like: The Day of the Locust by Nathanael West, Ask the Dust by John Fante, A Place in the Sun by Frank Fenton, and The Boosters by Mark Lee Luther.

Fenton's second novel, titled What Way My Journey Lies, arrived in late April, 1946 to similar acclaim. It's the story of a war-weary WWII veteran returning home to a life filled with changing worldviews and difficult choices. Again, The Los Angeles Times:

Fenton has a deft facility in that most difficult of all the novel's techniques—the overlaying, underlying and intertwining of the many moods that go to make up life...The dialogue is marvelous, more right than Parker or Hemingway and more human.

More recently, historian Kevin Starr used Fenton's "tightly written, highly philosophical second novel" as a good example of the challenges faced by returning WWII veterans in Embattled Dreams, the sixth volume in his Americans and the California Dream series.

But despite the positive reaction to his work, Fenton didn't write another novel, returning instead to the frustrating but lucrative world of screenwriting. The remainder of his print work constituted one short story in each of two early '50s science fiction anthologies, two magazine articles and an introduction to a quiz book.

== From film to television ==
By 1950, Fenton was divorced from June Martel, had two children (a boy, Mark, and a daughter, Joyce) with his second wife, actress Mary Jane Hodge (whom he'd married on February 10, 1945, in Las Vegas, Nevada) and was living in a two-story rural English home in the Cheviot Hills section of Los Angeles, just down the street from the former California Country Club, where he was a member.

Professionally, he'd graduated to "A" pictures by the mid-1940s, and was now writing bigger scripts with longer development periods for the likes of James Stewart & Spencer Tracy (Malaya), Robert Mitchum (His Kind of Woman), Stewart Granger (The Wild North), Robert Taylor (Ride, Vaquero!), William Holden (Escape from Fort Bravo), Mitchum, Marilyn Monroe & Rory Calhoun (River of No Return), Gary Cooper & Richard Widmark (Garden of Evil), Tyrone Power & Susan Hayward (Untamed), James Cagney & Barbara Stanwyck (These Wilder Years) and John Wayne (The Wings of Eagles). His final produced screenplay was for the Paramount release, The Jayhawkers! (1959), starring Jeff Chandler and Fess Parker.

By the end of the decade, however, things had become less steady. Mary Jane Fenton filed for divorce in 1957, and the near-constant shake-ups and re-organizations in the studio world had led to several announced writing projects being put on the back burner or simply being cancelled. Fortunately for Fenton, the early 1960s brought him steady work in the voracious television market, where he successfully adapted some of his unproduced screenplays for the small screen programs Kraft Mystery Theater and Kraft Suspense Theater. Another project originally developed by MGM for the big screen, The Dangerous Days of Kiowa Jones, was instead released in 1966 through their television arm.

After completing several assignments for episodic series dramas (including six for The Virginian), Fenton's final script — the well-regarded Something for a Lonely Man — came in collaboration with an old friend: John Fante. The two had last worked together in 1940 (along with Lynn Root on MGM's The Golden Fleecing), but it was clear that much time had passed, and neither was in good health. Fante would eventually lose both his legs and his eyesight to diabetes, and Fenton's fondness for nightlife and alcohol (bourbon, rum and gin rocks) had taken a toll as well. Neither man would receive another screen credit in their lifetimes.

On Monday, August 23, 1971, Frank Edgington Fenton died, a week after suffering a stroke.

== In popular culture ==
In John Fante's Dreams of Bunker Hill, the final installment of The Saga of Arturo Bandini, the author partially based a character on Fenton, a screenwriter named "Frank Edgington".

He is often confused—in print and online—with film and stage actor Frank Fenton Moran (April 9, 1906 – July 24, 1957). Even his own obituary had an incorrect age based on the actor's birthdate of 1906.

== Selected bibliography ==
=== Novels ===
- A Place in the Sun (New York: Random House, 1942).
- What Way My Journey Lies (New York: Duell, Sloan and Pearce, 1946).

=== Anthologized work ===
- Continent's End: A Collection of California Writing edited by Joseph Henry Jackson (New York: Whittlesey House, 1944) Contains: "Breathe In—Breathe Out" (Chapter 11 of A Place in the Sun)
- New Tales of Space and Time edited by Raymond J. Healy (New York: Holt, 1951) Contains: "Tolliver's Travels" An original short story by Fenton and fellow screenwriter Joseph Petracca.
- 9 Tales of Space and Time edited by Raymond J. Healy (New York: Holt, 1954) Contains: "The Chicken and the Egg-head," an original short story

=== Contributions ===
- I Knew It All the Time by Raymond J. Healy and John V. Cooper, (New York: Holt, 1953) A hardcover quiz book (74 quizzes/1600 Questions). Fenton wrote the book's introduction.

=== Short stories ===
- "Jitterbug" Collier's 102:14-15, December 3, 1938
- "Boy Meets Gorilla" Collier's 102:16-18, December 31, 1938
- "Interrupted Honeymoon" Collier's 104:20-21, September 23, 1939
- "Respectable Woman" Collier's 104:12-13, October 21, 1939
- "Pie-Eyed Piper of Hollywood" Collier's 105:21-22, April 13, 1940
- "Beautiful People" Collier's 105:14, April 20, 1940
- "Flying Dutchman" Collier's 106:9-10, October 20, 1940
- "High Cost of Love" Collier's 106:14-15, November 2, 1940
- "Actor in the Family" Collier's 107:16, January 18, 1941

=== Magazine articles ===
- "Hollywood Literary Life" American Mercury 45:280-86 (November 1938)
- "Hollywood's Message" Nation 179:424 (November 13, 1954)
- "Why is it All So Lousy?" Esquire 59:46, 48, 50 (February 1963)

== Citations ==
=== Works cited ===
- Cooper, Stephen (2005). Full of Life: A Biography of John Fante (rev. ed.). Santa Monica: Angel City Press.
- Fante, John (1982). Dreams of Bunker Hill. Santa Barbara: Black Sparrow Press.
- Jackson, Joseph Henry, ed. (1944). Continent's End. New York: Whittlesey House.
- McWilliams, Carey (1946). Southern California Country. New York: Duell, Sloan and Pearce.
- Starr, Kevin (1997). The Dream Endures. Oxford University Press.
- Starr, Kevin (2002). Embattled Dreams. Oxford University Press.
