= Ben's Game =

2004 video game

- Developer: Eric Johnston
- Publisher: Make-A-Wish Foundation
- Designers: Ben Duskin; Eric Johnston
- Platforms: Windows, Macintosh
- Release: May 2004
- Genre: Action
- Mode: Single-player

Ben's Game is a video game about fighting cancer. It was conceptualised in 2003 by Ben Duskin—an 8 year old American boy in remission from leukemia—and was published by the Make-A-Wish Foundation in 2004.

== Gameplay ==
Gameplay with the "Vamp monster" visible in the background

The gameplay can be described as a three-dimensional version of Asteroids, but instead of a ship, the player character is the child patient on a hoverboard. The left and right arrow keys spin the direction of the ship, the up arrow accelerates and the down brakes. There are 4 weapons available: Sword, Crossbow, Blaster and Missile, each of them having different types of projectiles. The player also has built-in ammo.

Ben's Game objective is to destroy all of the mutated cells. In addition, there are seven shields. Each shield protects against one of the common side effects of chemotherapy and is guarded by a "monster" that represents that side effect. The seven monsters and side effects are as follows: Iceman monster (colds), Robarf monster (vomiting and nausea), Big Chicken monster (chicken pox), Fire monster (fever), Vamp monster (bleeding), Qball monster (hair loss), and the Tornado monster (rash.) The player's ammunition consists of health (which comes from a hospital), ammo (which comes from a pharmacy), and attitude (which comes from home.)

Ben's Game also features camera control and a two-player mode. There are 12 characters and 6 boards available, however, it has a character/board creation feature, as the textures (and their "masks", which are white silhouettes that cut the black area, leaving only the character image to be seen) are normal JPEG files that can be copied and edited, to make new characters and/or boards.

== Plot ==
With a child patient as the hero miniaturized to microscopic level adventuring inside the child's own body, the object is to destroy all cancer cells and to collect the seven shields against common side effects of chemotherapy. Each shield is guarded by a "monster"—an incarnation of one of those side effects. Ben's Game was designed so that the player character never loses or dies.

== Development ==
When interviewed by Make-A-Wish, Ben's wish was to design a video game in which cancer cells were eaten to help other children visualize fighting their cancer and help them to cope with cancer treatments. He remembered his oncologist telling him to think of chemotherapy as eating cancer cells. When Make-A-Wish first approached gaming companies - their requests to help create a cancer-fighting video game were denied. Make-a-Wish Executive Director Patricia Wilson was told that a video game would take upwards of US$1,000,000 and possibly years to create. Ms. Wilson sought the help of her Board of Directors and within days the request to fulfill Ben's wish was posted on several gaming sites. Inquiries and offers to assist began immediately from game designers in the UK, Israel, Canada and the United States. One particular offer came from a Bay Area game designer who offered to spearhead the entire game design on one condition: that he have a chance to meet and work with Ben directly. Eric Johnston, a software engineer from LucasArts met with Ben weekly for 6 months and together, they created Ben's Game. Ben's own pediatric oncologist served as medical adviser for Ben's Game upon condition that UCSF Children's Hospital be the first medical facility to have Ben's Game installed for children to play.

== Release ==
Ben's Game was launched in May 2004 and as of September 2009, Ben's Game has been downloaded over 300,000 times by people all over the world. Ben's Game is freeware, available for Mac and Windows systems, and is multilingual (with support for 9 languages.) Ben's Game was made available online for free download for a period of time. Duskin and Johnston were awarded the "Unsung Hero of Compassion" by the Dalai Lama on 6 November 2005.

== Legacy ==
In 2007 another wish child, Jericho Rajninger, was inspired by Ben and Ben's Game and decided to use his wish to help other children as well. Jericho's wish, J.R. the Robot, delivers medication to children in the hospital.
