= Double Star =

1956 SF novel by Robert A. Heinlein

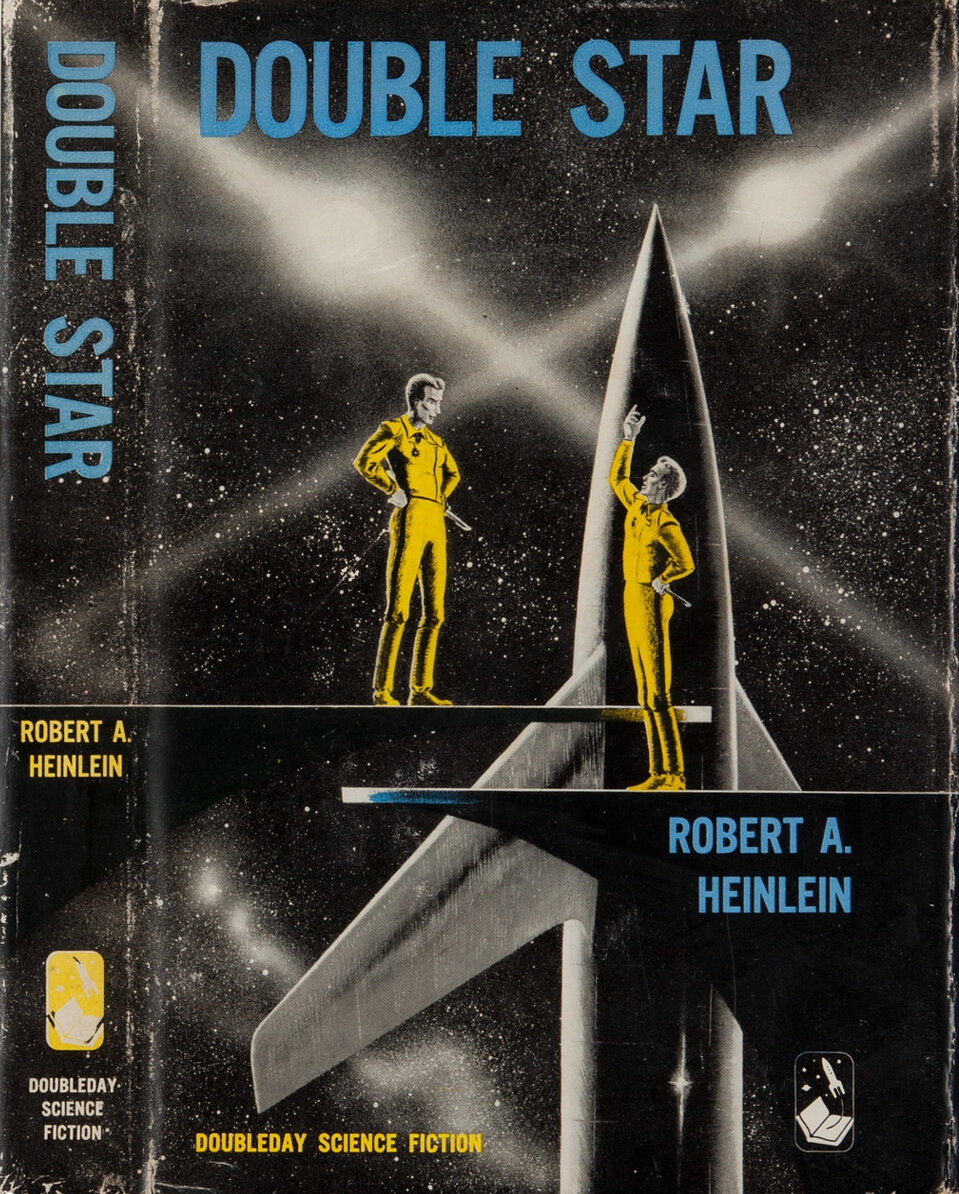
- First edition cover
- Author: Robert A. Heinlein
- Cover artist: Mel Hunter
- Language: English
- Genre: Science fiction
- Publisher: Doubleday
- Publication date: 1956
- Publication place: United States
- Media type: Print (hardback & paperback)
- Award: Hugo Award for Best Novel (1956)

Double Star is a science fiction novel by American writer Robert A. Heinlein, first serialized in Astounding Science Fiction (February, March, and April 1956) and published in hardcover the same year. It received the 1956 Hugo Award for Best Novel (his first).

== Plot summary ==
Cover of Astounding Science Fiction by Kelly Freas that carried the first segment of the serialized novel in February 1956

The novel is set in a future when the Moon, Mars, Venus, and Jupiter's moons have been colonized and the Solar System is governed by a parliamentary democracy under a constitutional monarchy from a capital city on the Moon. The indigenous alien race inhabiting Mars has recently been admitted to citizenship in the human-dominated solar system government.

The story, which is told in the first person, centers on down-and-out actor Lawrence Smith (stage name Lorenzo Smythe, also known as "The Great Lorenzo"). A brilliant actor and mimic, he is down to his last coin when a spaceman hires him to double for an unspecified public figure. It is only when he is on his way to Mars that he finds out he will have to impersonate one of the most prominent politicians in the Solar System, and one with whose views Smith deeply disagrees—John Joseph Bonforte. Bonforte is the leader of the Expansionist coalition, currently out of office, but with a good chance of changing that at the next general election. Bonforte has been kidnapped by his political opponents, and his aides want Smith to impersonate Bonforte while they try to find him.

Bonforte is rescued, but he is in poor health due to his treatment during his imprisonment. This forces Smith to extend his performance, even to becoming temporary prime minister and running in an election. This is made possible only through the use of Bonforte's extensive Farley files. The central political issue in the election is the granting of suffrage to Martians in the human-dominated Solar System. Lorenzo shares the anti-Martian prejudice prevalent among large parts of Earth's population, but he is called upon to assume the persona of the most prominent advocate of Martian enfranchisement. Smith takes on not only Bonforte's appearance, but some aspects of his personality.

At the moment of electoral victory, Bonforte dies of the aftereffects of his kidnapping, and Smith is asked to assume the role for life. In a retrospective conclusion set twenty-five years later, Smith reveals that he wrote the first-person narrative as therapy. By this point, he views his early life and ambitions as almost those of someone else. He has applied Bonforte's ideals in his political career to the best of his ability. Bonforte's adoring secretary and now Smith's wife, Penny, says, "she never loved anyone else."

== Critical reception ==
The noted science-fiction writer and critic James Blish was no fan of Heinlein's treatment of his first-person protagonists in a number of his novels. Writing in 1957, however, Blish says that "The only first-person narrator Heinlein has created who is a living, completely independent human being is The Great Lorenzo of Double Star. Lorenzo is complete all the way back to his childhood—the influence of his father upon what he thinks is one of the strongest motives in the story—and his growth under pressure is consistent with his character and no-one else's."

Galaxy reviewer Floyd C. Gale praised the novel, finding it "an excellent example of Heinlein's ability to take one of the oldest plots in any literature ... and present it as an enjoyable reading experience." Admitting "a certain reservation, even disappointment," Anthony Boucher nevertheless concluded that Heinlein was "simply creating an agreeably entertaining light novel, and in that task he succeeds admirably."

At the 1957 Worldcon it received the Hugo Award for Best Novel (Heinlein's first).

In 2012, the novel was included in the Library of America two-volume boxed set American Science Fiction: Nine Classic Novels of the 1950s, edited by Gary K. Wolfe.

== Cover controversy ==
The cover illustration by Anthony Roberts for a 1970s UK edition of Double Star was the subject of an unlikely controversy when it was used as the basis of an entry for the 2000 Turner Prize for modern art. The artist in question, Glenn Brown, was accused of plagiarism.

== See also ==
- 1956 in science fiction
- Dave, a 1993 film about a double for the president of the United States who has to keep impersonating him
- The Prisoner of Zenda (1894) by Anthony Hope, a novel about a double for the King of Ruritania
