= 9 Tales of Space and Time =

1954 anthology edited by Raymond J. Healy

- Dust-jacket from the first edition
- Editor: Raymond J. Healy
- Language: English
- Genre: Science fiction short stories
- Publisher: Henry Holt
- Publication date: 1954
- Publication place: United States
- Media type: Print (hardback)
- Pages: 307

9 Tales of Space and Time is an anthology of original science fiction stories edited by Raymond J. Healy, published in hardcover by Henry Holt in 1954. A British edition appeared in 1955, with the title rendered Nine Tales of Space and Time. No paperback editions are reported.

== Contents ==
- "The Idealists", John W. Campbell, Jr.
- "Shock Treatment", J. Francis McComas
- "Genius of the Species", Reginald Bretnor
- "Overture", Kris Neville
- "Compound B", David H. Fink
- "The Chicken Or the Egg-Head", Frank Fenton
- "The Great Devon Mystery", Raymond J. Healy
- "Balaam", Anthony Boucher
- "Man of Parts", Horace L. Gold

== Reception ==
P. Schuyler Miller, noting that Healy had managed to commission stories from the editors of the major science fiction magazines of the time, described the anthology as "one of the best anthologies you'll see in 1954."
