= The Devil-Doll =

1936 film by Tod Browning

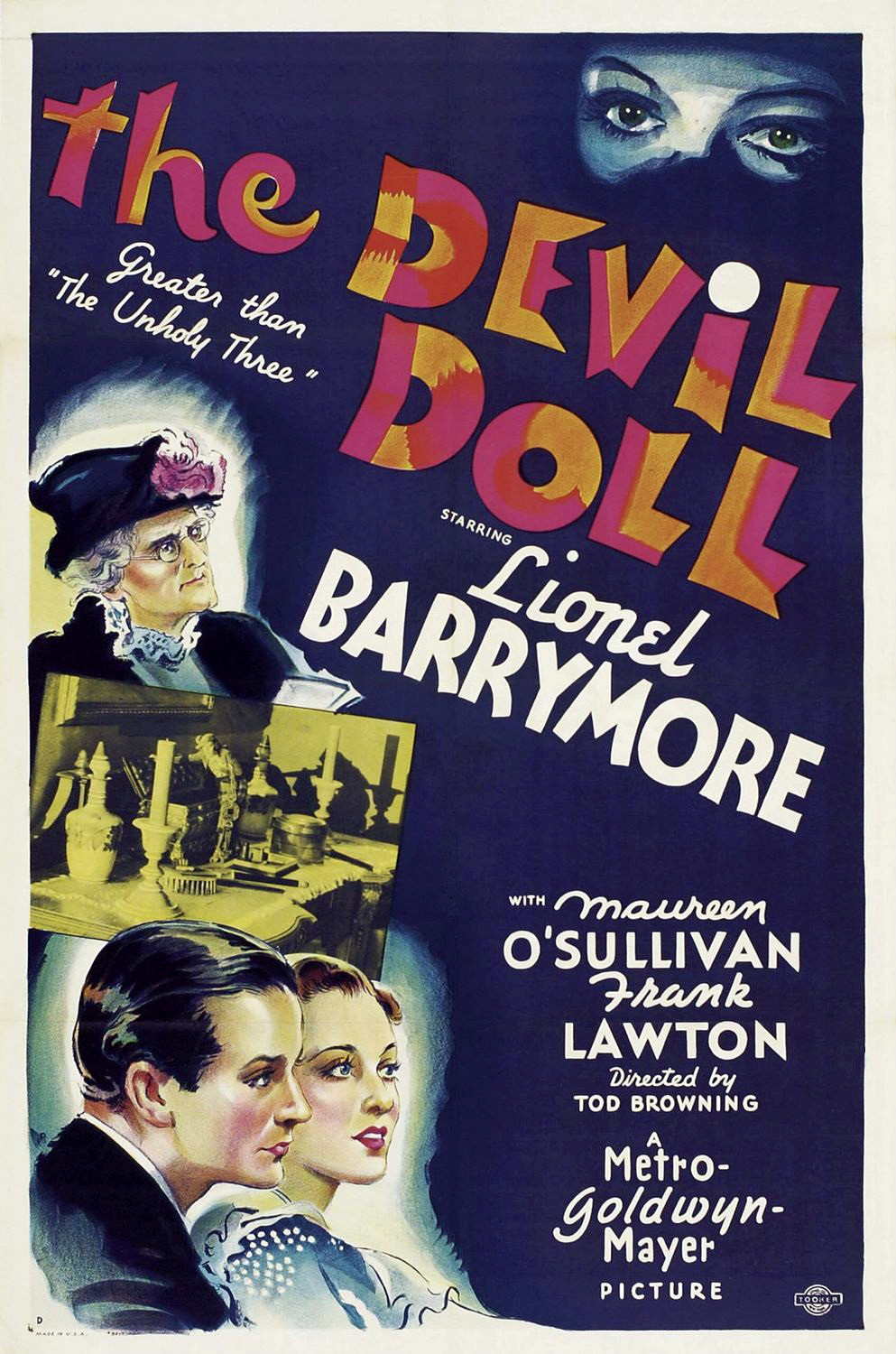
- Directed by: Tod Browning
- Written by: Tod Browning; Guy Endore; Garrett Fort; Erich von Stroheim
- Based on: Burn, Witch, Burn! 1933 novel by A. Merritt
- Produced by: Edward J. Mannix
- Starring: Lionel Barrymore; Maureen O'Sullivan
- Cinematography: Leonard Smith
- Edited by: Frederick Y. Smith
- Music by: Franz Waxman
- Production company: Metro-Goldwyn-Mayer
- Distributed by: Metro-Goldwyn-Mayer
- Release date: July 10, 1936
- Running time: 79 minutes
- Country: United States
- Language: English

The Devil-Doll (1936; trailer)

The Devil-Doll is a 1936 American horror film directed by Tod Browning and starring Lionel Barrymore and Maureen O'Sullivan. The film was loosely influenced by the novel Burn Witch Burn! (1932) by Abraham Merritt. It has become a cult film.

A French scientist is worried about human overpopulation. He creates a formula able to shrink humans, in order for the planet's resources to last longer. He dies shortly after a prison escape, and his former cellmate decides to use the formula in a revenge scheme. The former prisoner targets the people who had originally framed him for bank robbery and murder.

== Plot ==
Paul Lavond, who was wrongly convicted of robbing his own Paris bank and killing a night watchman more than seventeen years ago, escapes Devil's Island with Marcel, a scientist who is trying to create a formula to reduce people to one-sixth of their original size. The intended purpose of the formula is to make the Earth's limited resources last longer for an ever-growing population. The scientist dies after their escape.

Lavond joins the scientist's widow, Malita, and decides to use the shrinking technique to obtain revenge on the three former business associates who had framed him and to vindicate himself. He returns to Paris and disguises himself as an old woman who sells lifelike dolls. He shrinks a young girl and one of his former associates to infiltrate the homes of the other two former associates, paralyzing one.

When the final associate confesses before he is attacked, Lavond clears his name and secures the future happiness of his estranged daughter, Lorraine, in the process. Malita isn't satisfied, and wants to continue to use the formula to carry on her husband's work. She tries to kill Paul when he announces that he is finished with their partnership, having accomplished all he intended, but she blows up their lab, killing herself.

Paul tells Toto, Lorraine's fiancé, about what happened. He meets his daughter, pretending to be the deceased Marcel. He tells Lorraine that Paul Lavond died during their escape from prison, but that he loved her very much. Lavond then departs, to an uncertain fate.

== Cast ==
- Lionel Barrymore as Paul Lavond
- Maureen O'Sullivan as Lorraine Lavond
- Frank Lawton as Toto
- Rafaela Ottiano as Malita
- Robert Greig as Emil Coulvet
- Lucy Beaumont as Madame Lavond
- Henry B. Walthall as Marcel
- Grace Ford as Lachna
- Pedro de Cordoba as Charles Matin
- Arthur Hohl as Victor Radin
- Juanita Quigley as Marguerite Coulvet
- Claire Du Brey as Madame Coulvet (as Claire du Brey)
- Rollo Lloyd as Detective Maurice
- Frank Reicher as Doctor (uncredited)

== Reception ==
Marketed as a novelty thriller, The Devil-Doll was not a financial success, although it did receive some praise from critics. The New York Times gave the film a positive review, making special note of its entertaining use of special effects, comparing it favorably to such films as King Kong and The Invisible Man. However, a review in the American science fiction magazine Thrilling Wonder Stories was not as enthusiastic, calling the film a "disappointment" and a "run-of-the-mill thriller which does not attempt to recapture the unique fantasy of Merritt's novel."

== Home media ==
Warner Home Video released this film on DVD in 2006 as part of the Hollywood Legends of Horror Collection boxset as part of a double feature with Mad Love. Warner Archive Collection released this film on Blu-ray, this time on October 24, 2023, which is sourced from a fresh 4K scan of the original preservation elements.

== See also ==
- List of films featuring miniature people
- Lionel Barrymore filmography
