= To Live Forever =

1956 novel by Jack Vance

- First edition
- Author: Jack Vance
- Cover artist: Richard M. Powers
- Language: English
- Genre: Science fiction
- Publisher: Ballantine Books
- Publication date: 1956
- Publication place: United States
- Media type: Print (Paperback)
- Pages: 185

To Live Forever is a science fiction novel by American writer Jack Vance, first published in 1956. In the Vance Integral Edition, it was retitled Clarges.

== Plot summary ==
The city of Clarges in the future is a near-utopia, surrounded by barbarism throughout the rest of the world. Abundant resources and the absence of political conflict lead to a pleasant life that should be stress-free. However, nearly everyone is obsessed with a perpetual scramble for longer life, as measured by slope.

Medical technology has led to a great lengthening of the human lifespan, but, in order to prevent the Malthusian horrors of overpopulation, it is awarded only to those citizens who have made notable contributions. Five categories have been created for those playing the life-extension game, the first four each offering an additional allowance of life: ten more years for achieving the second stage, then sixteen years, and finally an extra twenty years (a lifespan of 128 years) before achieving immortality. One's progress can be shown as a graph, whose upward direction indicates a greater likelihood of achieving the next level. Therefore, the slope of one's "lifeline" is a measure of success. A person whose lifeline reaches the vertical terminator is not merely deprived of life-lengthening treatment, they are deliberately eliminated by government operatives, known as "Assassins".

Eventually the Fair-Play Act was drafted, and won a grudging approval. In essence, the system rewarded public service with years of extended life. Five phyle, or levels of achievement, were stipulated: Base, Second, Third, Fourth, Fifth. Base became known as Brood; Second, the Wedge; Third, less frequently, Arrant; and Fourth, Verge. When the original Grand-Union group organized the Amaranth Society, Fifth became Amaranth.

The ultimate prize is the top category, called Amaranth, which offers true immortality to the fortunate few. People who achieve this distinction are accorded the honorific "The" in front of their name.

Grayven Warlock was one of those few (thus known as The Grayven Warlock), but he has become a fugitive after a feud with another Amaranth resulted in the latter's death. Masquerading as his own "relict" (clone) using the name Gavin Waylock, he lives in obscurity, looking for the accomplishment that will reinstate him among the immortals. However, Waylock's dramatic stratagems result in changes to society far beyond anything he had intended.

== Reception ==
Galaxy reviewer Floyd C. Gale praised the novel as "frighteningly logical", saying that "[t]he sick, inbred society of Vance's imagination comes fully alive, even though his characters remain mere symbols."
