= Aleksandr Bushkov =

Russian writer (1956–2025)

Aleksandr Bushkov Александр Бушков
- Born: 5 April 1956 Minusinsk, Krasnoyarsk Krai, Russian SFSR, USSR
- Died: 29 September 2025 (aged 69)
- Citizenship: Russian
- Genre: History, crime fiction, thriller, science fiction, fantasy, non-fiction, columnist, non-fiction

Website
- shantarsk.ru

Aleksandr Aleksandrovich Bushkov (Russian: Александр Александрович Бушков; 5 April 1956 – 29 September 2025) was a Russian author who wrote books in the genres of science fiction, crime fiction, popular history and non-fiction. In his belletristic, published in literary and popular journals, Bushkov had been critical of conventional academic approaches in fields such as history and evolutionary biology. As indicated on the personal webpage of the author, his total number of volumes published (all works and all editions) exceeds 17 million.

== Life and career ==
Aleksandr Bushkov was born in the city of Minusinsk, which is located in Krasnoyarsk Krai, Siberia, Russia, on 5 April 1956. His ancestors had Baltic origins and originated in Lithuania. He struggled to learn in a conventional classroom setting, and he had stated in interviews that he was a poor student, often acting up. Bushkov would never receive an undergraduate degree and was largely self-taught, through his voracious appetite for reading. His personal library had grown to such an immense size over the years that he was forced to add a second storey to his dacha in order to accommodate it. Prior to the death in a helicopter crash of the former governor of Krasnoyarsk Krai, Alexander Lebed in 2002, Bushkov had held office as an advisor and aide to the governor. After 2002, information about Bushkov became increasingly scarce. The author's website suggests that he was living in isolation in a dacha on the distant outskirts of Minusinsk, which lacked modern means of communication, and so, he was essentially a recluse. Bushkov shared his home with several hamsters and a dog. He died on 29 September 2025, at the age of 69.
