= Brian Plante =

American science fiction writer (born 1956)

Brian Plante (born 1956) is an American science fiction writer. As of 2007, he had published 49 short stories. Analog magazine has published 16 of his stories and most of the recent ones. Plante has written several sarcastic essays on writing, including the "Chronicles of the Garden Valley Writers," an account of dynamics in a fiction writer criticism group. His non-fiction has appeared in Manifest Destiny, Fantastic Collectibles, and from 1995 to 1998 as a monthly column in The New Jersey Graveline.

== Honors and awards ==
Plante was a 1995 Writers of the Future finalist.

"Lavender In Love", originally published in the February 2003 issue of Analog, won the AnLab (Analog readers poll) award for best short story of 2003. Planet's "The Astronaut", published in May 2007, won him the 2008 Anlab award for best short story of 2007.

His 1998 story "Drawn Words" was on the preliminary ballot for the 1999 Nebula Award. Several of his other stories have earned "honorable mention" honors in Gardner Dozois' The Year's Best Science Fiction collections.
