= Rebecca M. Meluch =

American novelist

- Born: October 24, 1956 (age 69)
- Occupation: Writer
- Writing career
- Pen name: R. M. Meluch
- Genre: Science fiction

Rebecca M. Meluch, published as R. M. Meluch (born October 24, 1956) is an American writer of science fiction. Most of her stories take place in military settings.

From 1979 to 1992, Meluch wrote several novels treating a variety of subjects, followed by a period in which she published rarely. In 2005, she published the first of the Tour of the Merrimack series of military science fiction/space opera novels. The series is set on the warship U.S.S. Merrimack in a future where the United States and a recreated Roman Empire are at war with the alien "Hive".

Her novel Jerusalem Fire (1985) explores themes of religion, loyalty, pride and conformity.

== Works ==
=== Wind series ===
1. Wind Dancers (1981)
2. Wind Child (1982)

=== Tour of the Merrimack series ===
1. The Myriad (2005)
2. Wolf Star (2006)
3. The Sagittarius Command (2007)
4. Strength and Honor (2008)
5. The Ninth Circle (2011)
6. The Twice and Future Caesar (2015)

=== Other novels ===
- Sovereign (1979)
- Jerusalem Fire (1985)
- War Birds (1989)
- Chicago Red (1990)
- The Queen's Squadron (1992)
- Eagles of September (2015)
- Blood of Akhilles (2017)

=== Short stories ===
- "Conversation with a Legend" (1989)
- "Traitor" (1995)
- "Vati", collected in Harry Turtledove's anthology Alternate Generals (1998)
- "Twelve Legions of Angels", collected in Harry Turtledove's anthology Alternate Generals II (2002)
- "Strength and Honor" (excerpt) (2008)
- "Dagger Team Seven" (2013)

== Reception ==
In reviews of the Merrimack series, Jo Walton and Liz Bourke praised the series's colorful and pulpy setting, action-heavy plot and innovative alternate universe plot twists, but criticized it for exhibiting thin characterization, simplistic politics and sexism.
