= He Who Shrank =

Short story by Henry Hasse

He Who Shrank is a science fiction novella by Henry Hasse, printed as the featured story in the August 1936 issue of Amazing Stories magazine (illustrated on the cover and in its interior pages by Leo Morey). It is about a man who is forever shrinking through worlds nested within a universe with apparently endless levels of scale. It was reprinted in the 1946 collection Adventures in Time and Space, edited by Raymond J. Healy and J. Francis McComas, and in Isaac Asimov's anthology of 1930s science fiction Before the Golden Age.

== Plot ==
A world-celebrated professor reveals to his assistant, the tale's narrator, that he has discovered that the visible universe at the largest scales corresponds to the microscopic universe at the smallest observed scales, the relations between the universe's planets, suns, and star clusters being identical to the relations of electrons, atomic nuclei, and molecules. Rather than explore the universe at their own scale, the professor intends to explore the worlds endlessly nested within matter itself which, he argues by induction, must go on to ever smaller levels, and claims to have invented a substance that, once applied, will cause an individual to perpetually shrink. His assistant thinks he's insane, but the professor, surprising the assistant, injects him with the substance, temporarily paralyzing the assistant and dooming him to eternally shrink ever smaller, through successively smaller worlds, each a subatomic particle of the previous one (the injected substance, "Shrinx", has engineered secondary properties, such as oxygenating the blood and protecting against heat loss in space). The professor will monitor the assistant's fate through a device that receives his sense of sight and sound, and intends to eventually follow suit and set himself shrinking as well, although they would never meet again due to the infinitesimal chance of tracing the same path through the subatomic worlds.

The assistant, sent as an involuntary scout, shrinks further and further, through the peril of being attacked by a microorganism, down to various worlds, inhabited by various beings who, at their time scales, have seen him approach for years or centuries, including intelligent gaseous beings, cave people, space-faring birdlike beings who flee to their moon to escape self-replicating machines who have overrun their planet and will likely go on spreading through the universe at that scale, and others the narrator mentions only in passing, of widely varying forms. One race of intangible beings teaches the narrator skills for controlling matter with thought. Though it lies within the power of some advanced races to halt his shrinking or grant him release from life (for he finds he has become immortal), none will interfere.

The narrator eventually finds his way down to a blue planet, where he is examined by scientists who underestimate his intelligence due to communication difficulties (he has become so accustomed to communicating by thought transference with more advanced races he has forgotten how to even attempt to speak vocally to leave some record for them, and they are too primitive to register his thoughts). He tires of them and escapes, making his way out of the city, subduing those who bar his way with waves of angry thought that render them unconscious. He makes his way to an isolated house outside the city, where a man is listening to a broadcast about the alien who touched down in Lake Erie, near Cleveland. He finds the individual has a more imaginative, receptive mind than the others encountered, and asks to dictate to the man his story. It is at this point revealed that the narrator is not from Earth, but from a world that is at an inconceivable level above us, and that he has reached our world.

In the epilogue, the writer, a renowned writer of both "serious books" and "scores of short stories and books of the widely popular type of literature known as science fiction" gives a press interview announcing the publication of the story above for free, which he wrote in his own hand while under a voluntarily induced trance. He asserts that the story is true, but grants that it may be received by many as fiction.

== Reception ==
Carl Sagan in 1978 wrote that the story "presents an entrancing cosmological speculation which is being seriously revived today".

== Notes ==
The story makes reference to the then-recent proposal that the universe is expanding, based on the discovery that distant astronomic bodies appeared to be receding.

The idea of a fractal universe, with atoms or subatomic particles of one scale corresponding to the stars of another scale, had been employed in other science fiction works, such as "Out of the Sub-Universe" (1928) by Roman Frederick Starzl.

== See also ==
- The Shrinking Man
