= The Incredible Shrinking Woman =

1981 film

- Theatrical release poster
- Directed by: Joel Schumacher
- Written by: Jane Wagner
- Based on: The Shrinking Man by Richard Matheson
- Produced by: Hank Moonjean
- Starring: Lily Tomlin; Charles Grodin; Ned Beatty
- Cinematography: Bruce Logan
- Edited by: Jeff Gourson; Anthony Redman
- Music by: Suzanne Ciani
- Distributed by: Universal Pictures
- Release date: January 30, 1981
- Running time: 88 minutes
- Country: United States
- Language: English
- Budget: $10 million
- Box office: $20.3 million

The Incredible Shrinking Woman is a 1981 American science-fiction comedy film directed by Joel Schumacher, written by Jane Wagner, and starring Lily Tomlin, Charles Grodin, Ned Beatty, John Glover, and Elizabeth Wilson. A parody of the 1957 science-fiction film The Incredible Shrinking Man, it is credited as based on Richard Matheson's 1956 novel, The Shrinking Man. The original music score was composed by Suzanne Ciani.

== Plot ==
Pat Kramer of Tasty Meadows is an ordinary suburban housewife and mother of two children Beth and Jeff. Her husband Vance is an advertising executive. After exposure to an experimental perfume and other chemicals from Vance's company, she begins to shrink, gradually at first, then rapidly.

A few weeks pass and Pat has shrunk to the height of Beth and Jeff. Eventually, she becomes a celebrity of sorts, appearing on The Mike Douglas Show, and captures the hearts of the American people. Soon, she is less than a foot tall, forcing her to move into a dollhouse.

Pat is kidnapped by a group of mad scientists, who make it seem that she perished in the kitchen garbage disposal. They plan to shrink everyone in the world by performing experiments on her to learn her secret. With the help of Rob, a kind young lab custodian, and a super-intelligent gorilla named Sidney she escapes.

Speaking of her escape to a crowd of people, Pat continues to shrink, saying her goodbyes before becoming microscopic in size. Vanishing from sight, she is again presumed dead, but in fact she falls into a puddle of spilled household chemicals – which return her to her original size. After her homecoming celebrating her returning to a normal size she notices that her wedding ring is now too tight while her foot is splitting her shoe open, suggesting she might still be growing.

== Cast ==
- Lily Tomlin as Pat Kramer/Judith Beasley
- Charles Grodin as Vance Kramer
- Ned Beatty as Dan Beame
- Henry Gibson as Dr. Eugene Nortz
- Elizabeth Wilson as Dr. Ruth Ruth
- Mark Blankfield as Rob
- Maria Smith as Concepcion
- John Glover as Tom Keller
- Pamela Bellwood as Sandra Dyson
- Nicholas Hormann as Logan Carver
- Jim McMullan as Lyle Parks
- Shelby Balik as Beth Kramer
- Justin Dana as Jeff Kramer
- Rick Baker as Sidney
- Mike Douglas as Himself
- Donovan Scott as Neighbor
- Martin Ferrero as Guard
- Nancy Lenehan as Guard
- Joe Spano as Guard
- Macon McCalman as Dr. Atkins
- Dick Wilson as Store Manager
- Sally Kirkland as Store Cashier
- Pat Ast as Supermarket Customer
- Jonathan Prince as Bag Boy
- Terry McGovern as Cheese Demonstrator
- Gary Goetzman as Newscaster
- Julie Brown as TV Commercial Actress
- Janice Carroll as TV Commercial Actress
- Mitzi Hoag as Secretary
- Tom McLoughlin as Toy
- Richmond Shepard as Toy
- Marneen Fields as Screaming Shopper

== Production ==
Lily Tomlin plays four characters in this film: lead character Pat Kramer; her neighbor Judith Beasley (a character derived from Tomlin's live shows); Tomlin's Laugh-In characters Ernestine (a telephone operator); and Edith Ann, (a little girl - seen only in the TV version of the film). The film reunited Lily Tomlin with fellow Laugh-In cast member Henry Gibson. Lily Tomlin and Elizabeth Wilson previously appeared together in 9 to 5 (1980) as Violet Newstead and Roz Keith, respectively.

Rick Baker, who plays Sidney the Gorilla in the film, was the first recipient of the Academy Award for Best Makeup for An American Werewolf in London (1981) when the category was first introduced at the 54th Academy Awards in 1982. Baker's career, especially his early fascination with gorillas and his work in three movies featuring them, is told in the TV documentary Gorillas: Primal Contact (2002). Actor Dick Wilson plays a fussy supermarket manager, much like his famous Charmin tissue TV commercial character, Mr. Whipple. The film's writer, Jane Wagner, is Tomlin's wife and frequent collaborator.

The film started principal photography in February 1979 with John Landis directing but was suspended after a few days, with the reason stated as budget issues. Production resumed August 13, 1979, with Joel Schumacher replacing Landis. According to Landis, on an episode of Shock Waves Podcast, he wanted a trailer in theaters "one year before Shrinking Woman comes out" featuring Alfred Hitchcock in silhouette. The trailer would have Hitchcock speaking to the camera: "Good evening, work is underway here at Universal Studios in Hollywood on potentially the most important motion picture of all time - The Incredible Shrinking Woman starring Lily Tomlin." At this point, Hitchcock would uncup his hands from his desk, and a miniature-sized Tomlin would appear underneath.

Actress Julie Brown has noted that Tomlin, after seeing Brown perform live, gave her her first film role by casting her in this film, thus qualifying her to receive a Screen Actors Guild membership. Her role was ultimately reduced to several seconds of non-speaking screen time.

== Reception ==
The film opened to predominantly negative reviews from critics. On review aggregator Rotten Tomatoes, the film has an approval rating of 27% based on 11 reviews, with an average rating of 4.2/10.

Upon release, Vincent Canby of The New York Times called the film "an amiably funny variation on Jack Arnold's classic 1957 science-fiction film, The Incredible Shrinking Man, which had been based on Richard Matheson's novel The Shrinking Man", adding that the film was "a low-key comedy that rambles from one comic idea to the next with the slightly uneasy manner of a nightclub comedian doing a new improvisation. It succeeds in bits and pieces that are separated by long patches that are more remarkable for their good will than for their wit." Regarding Jane Wagner's screenplay, he wrote, "Miss Wagner has a great talent for the kind of monologues, sketches and oddball characters that made Miss Tomlin's Appearing Nitely so memorable on Broadway, but not for creating a sustained comic narrative."

Roger Ebert of the Chicago Sun-Times was more enthusiastic, calling it "a terrific movie for kids and teenagers. It's a melancholy fact of the times we live in that any movie of even moderate ambition is supposed to become a blockbuster - and that 'family movies', with few exceptions, are inane, innocent, and boring. But The Incredible Shrinking Woman is not inane, is sometimes wickedly knowing, and is only periodically boring." Ebert observed that the movie was "also funny in its visual approach, showing us a suburban world in which everything is done in hideously jolly colors and everybody, even the TV anchorman, wears peach blazers. America in this movie looks like a gigantic paint-color chart." He concluded that while the movie succeeds on several levels, it does so "without ever breaking through to become a really inspired comedy."

== Home media ==
The Incredible Shrinking Woman was released in pan-and-scan on VHS by Universal on July 13, 1994. On November 4, 2009, an unmastered low-quality DVD release (manufactured on demand using DVD-R recordable media) in 16:9 anamorphic widescreen was offered under the Universal Vault Series banner.

On October 31, 2017, Shout! Factory released a "Collector's Edition" Blu-ray with an updated transfer, including interviews and a deleted scene with Edith Ann, a character also played by Tomlin.

== See also ==
- List of American films of 1981
- List of films featuring miniature people
