= The Incredible Shrinking Man =

1957 film by Jack Arnold

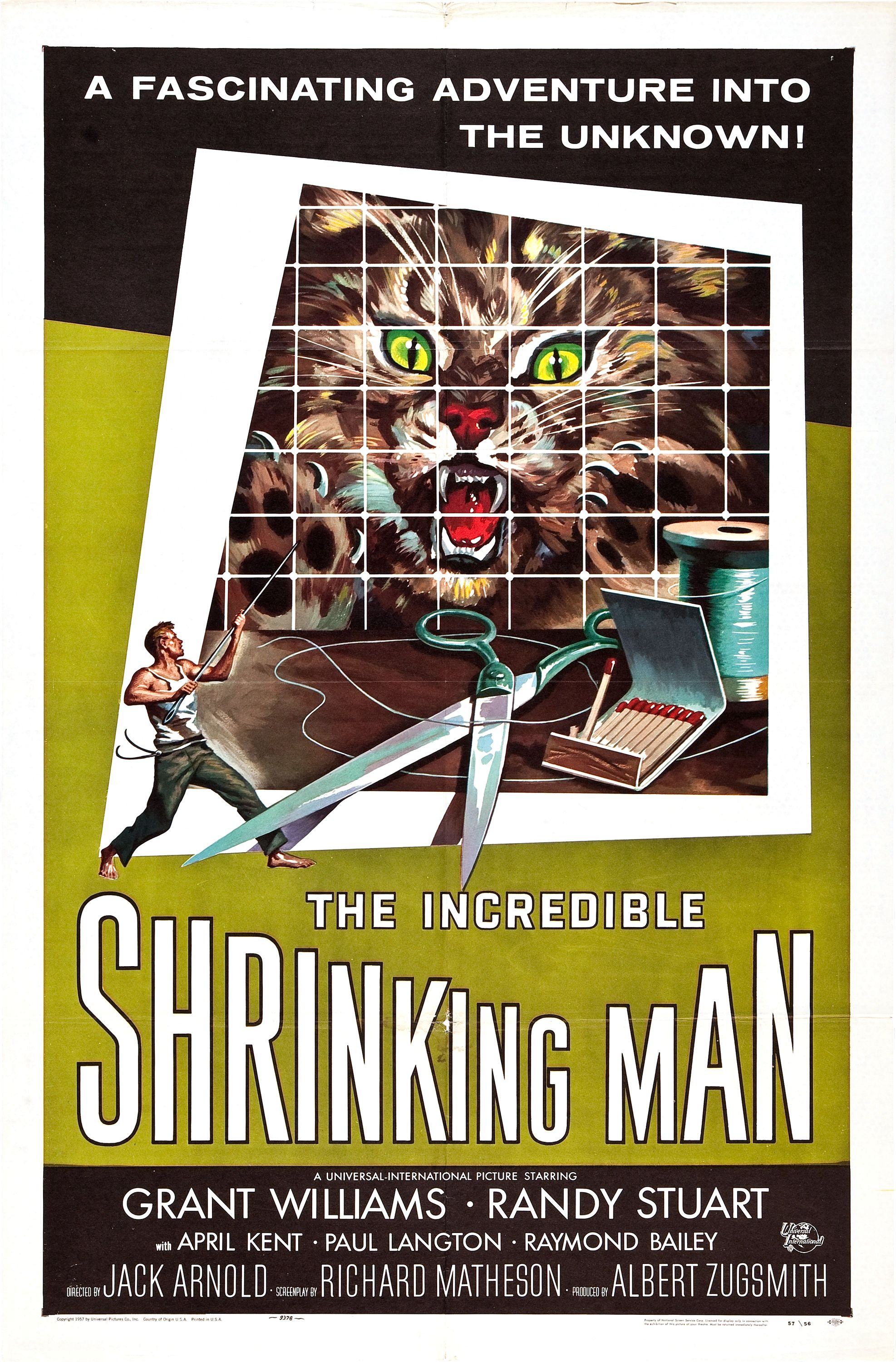
- Theatrical release poster
- Directed by: Jack Arnold
- Screenplay by: Richard Matheson; Richard Alan Simmons
- Based on: The Shrinking Man by Richard Matheson
- Produced by: Albert Zugsmith
- Starring: Grant Williams; Randy Stuart; April Kent; Paul Langton; Raymond Bailey
- Cinematography: Ellis W. Carter
- Edited by: Al Joseph
- Production company: Universal-International Pictures Co., Inc.
- Distributed by: Universal Pictures
- Release dates: February 22, 1957 (Globe Theatre); March 27, 1957 (Los Angeles); April 1957 (United States)
- Running time: 81 minutes
- Country: United States
- Language: English
- Budget: $750,000

The Incredible Shrinking Man is a 1957 American science fiction film directed by Jack Arnold, based on Richard Matheson's 1956 novel, The Shrinking Man. The film stars Grant Williams as Scott and Randy Stuart as Scott's wife, Louise. While relaxing on a boat, Scott is enveloped by a strange fog. Months later, he discovers that he appears to be shrinking. By the time Scott has reached the height of a small boy, his condition becomes known to the public. When he learns there is no cure for his condition, he lashes out at his wife. As Scott shrinks to the point where he can fit into a dollhouse, he has a battle with his family cat, leaving him lost and alone in his basement, where he is now smaller than the average insect.

The film's storyline was expanded by Matheson after he had sold the story to Universal-International Pictures Co., Inc. He also completed the novel upon which the film is based while production was underway. Matheson's script was initially written in flashbacks, and Richard Alan Simmons rewrote it using a more conventional narrative structure. Director Jack Arnold initially wanted Dan O'Herlihy to play Scott, but O'Herlihy turned down the role, leading Universal to sign Williams as the lead. Filming began on May 31, 1956. Scenes involving special effects were shot throughout production, while others used the large sets of Universal's backlot. Production went over budget, and filming had to be extended; certain special effects shots required reshooting. Williams was constantly being injured on set.

Before the film's release in New York City on February 22, 1957, its ending first went to test audiences who felt the character's fate should be changed. The director's original ending remained in the film. The film grossed $1.43 million in the United States and Canada and was among the highest-grossing science fiction films of the 1950s. A sequel, The Fantastic Little Girl, originally penned by Matheson, never went into production. A remake was developed years later, eventually becoming the comedy The Incredible Shrinking Woman (1981). Other remakes were planned in the early 2000s, one of which was to star Eddie Murphy in a more comedic variation on the film. A new adaptation was announced in 2013, with Matheson writing the screenplay with his son Richard Christian Matheson. In 2009, the film was selected for preservation in the United States National Film Registry by the Library of Congress as being "culturally, historically, or aesthetically significant."

== Plot ==
In the mid-1950s, Robert Scott Carey, known as "Scott," is on vacation with his wife, Louise, when a strange mist envelops him. Six months later, he observes that his clothes are too large, suspects he is shrinking, and seeks medical advice. Initially, his doctor denies that Carey is shrinking. Later, the doctor confirms the shrinking through X-rays and refers him to a medical research institute. The institute determines that Carey's exposure to the mist, combined with further exposure to a pesticide, rearranged his molecular structure, causing him to shrink. Carey informs Louise that, given his predicament, she is free to leave him. Louise promises to stay, and as she does, Carey's wedding ring slips off his finger.

Carey's condition turns him into a national curiosity. Media attention forces him into seclusion within his home. Advised to sell his story, Carey starts a journal detailing his experiences. An antidote is discovered, halting his shrinking, but doctors caution that he will remain three feet tall for the rest of his life unless a solution is found to reverse his condition. Emotionally shattered, Carey meets Clarice, a carnival worker and dwarf, who is exactly his height. Clarice encourages Carey, inspiring him to continue his journal. Later, he notices he is now shorter than Clarice and dejectedly runs home.

Carey shrinks small enough to live in a dollhouse and becomes more tyrannical. When Louise leaves home on an errand, he falls into his basement after Butch, the family cat, attacks him. Louise returns and assumes Butch ate Carey after finding a bloody scrap of Carey's clothing. Louise prepares to move out, with Carey's brother, Charlie, assisting.

Carey faces significant challenges navigating his basement and is unable to climb the stairs back up, deciding to wait for Louise to come down. The water heater bursts, but when Charlie and Louise come to investigate, Carey is too small for them to see and hear his screams for help. He battles a large spider while searching for food and shelter. He ultimately kills the spider with a straight pin and collapses in exhaustion. He awakens, small enough to escape the basement through one of the netting squares of a window screen. Carey accepts his fate of shrinking to microscopic size. He is no longer afraid, concluding that no matter how small he becomes, he will still matter in the universe because God will know he exists.

== Cast ==
Cast adapted from the American Film Institute.

- Grant Williams as Robert Scott Carey
- Randy Stuart as Louise Carey
- April Kent as Clarice Bruce
- Paul Langton as Charlie Carey
- Raymond Bailey as Dr. Thomas Silver
- William Schallert as Dr. Arthur Bramson
- Frank Scannell as Barker
- Helene Marshall as Nurse
- Diana Darrin as Nurse
- Billy Curtis as Midget
- Orangey as Butch the cat (uncredited)

== Production ==
=== Development and pre-production ===
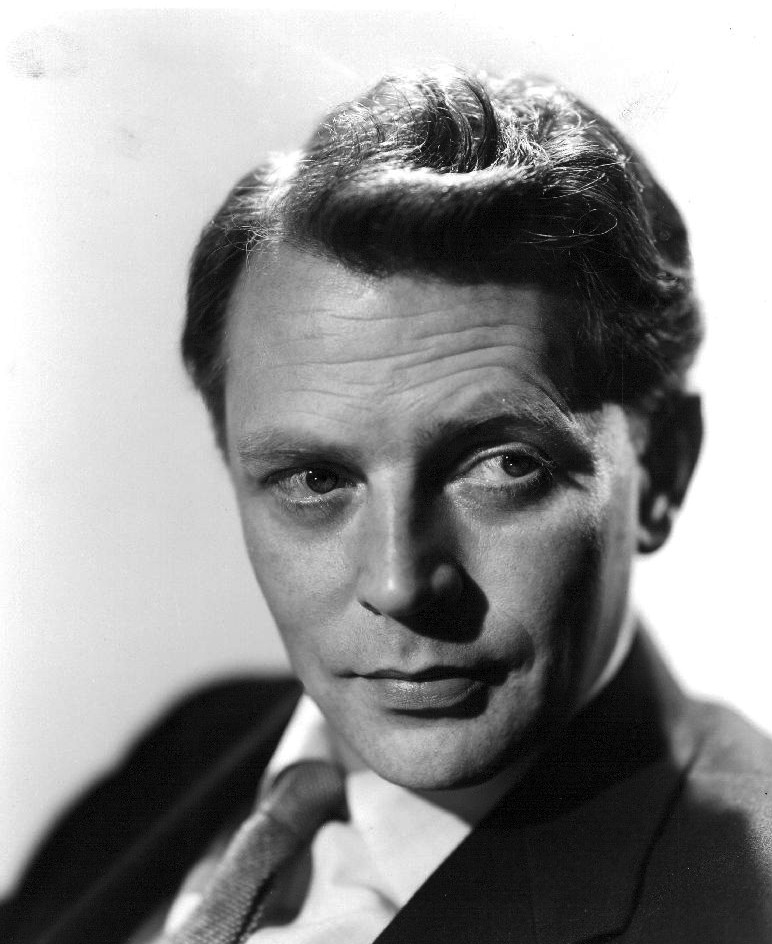
Producer Albert Zugsmith initially wanted Dan O'Herlihy (pictured) to play the role of Scott Carey.

Richard Matheson's idea for the original novel was inspired by a scene in the film Let's Do It Again, where Ray Milland's character leaves an apartment with the wrong hat. It is much too large for Milland and sinks down around his head and ears. Matheson sold the rights to Universal on the condition that he write the screenplay. It was Matheson's first screenplay, a writing format he felt he adapted to quickly. Matheson's initial script followed Scott Carey already shrunken and battling a spider in his basement. His rewrite is told in flashback form: scenes of Carey and the spider are interspersed with scenes telling the story of Carey's gradual loss in height.

The film was already into its second month of production before the novel was published in May 1956 by Gold Medal Books. Producer Albert Zugsmith added the word "Incredible" to Matheson's title and passed the script to Richard Alan Simmons, who removed the script's flashback structure. Matheson later discussed working with Universal, finding that the producer had a "very commercial mind" which made the script weaker in terms of character. In an interview in Cinefantastique magazine, Matheson stated he protested sharing a screen credit with Simmons. The screen credits list Matheson as the writer, while the shooting script lists both Matheson and Simmons.

Pre-production was originally set to begin on April 20, 1956, but it started officially on April 24. The cast consisted of mostly unknown actors. Director Jack Arnold phoned Randy Stuart, who was a personal friend, asking if she would be interested in doing the film. Zugsmith initially wanted Dan O'Herlihy to play the role of Scott Carey. O'Herlihy had just been nominated for an Academy Award for his role in Robinson Crusoe. After reading the script, he refused to play another isolated character, not wanting to be typecast in that kind of role. Grant Williams was cast because Universal had him pegged to become a star. On April 4, 1956, Williams and Stuart were screen tested and deemed acceptable for the roles of Scott and Louise Carey.

=== Filming ===
On the first day of production, May 31, Universal's operating committee decided that because of the type of special photography involved in the making of the film, the publicity department would cooperate by publicizing a closed-door policy on the set. On-set photography would not be allowed while the film was shot to stimulate public and trade interest. Shooting took either five or six weeks, including the special effects sequences. The budget ranged between $700,000 and $800,000. Film critic Kim Newman said the budget was "not expensive", with most of it used for special effects.

Some special effects shots were the earliest taken for the picture. For example, shots with Randy Stuart were taken against a black velvet backdrop and then composited with shots of Williams on an enlarged living room set. Their movements were synchronized using negatives from the first exposed scene in the camera gate, with the opposite done for the other scene. Sound production began on May 31. An oversized dollhouse was built for Williams on Stage 28. It had previously been used for The Phantom of the Opera and Dracula. Arnold said he filmed scenes with the cat in a normal studio with an animal trainer who had about 40 identical cats. To coax the cat to approach the dollhouse, Arnold hid food in it so the cat would find a way into the house. Later he timed the cat's reactions and directed Williams accordingly to react to the cat. Arnold first attempted to follow the novel and use a black widow spider. After preliminary tests, he found black widows were too small to use properly in the film. In an interview with Tom Weaver, Randy Stuart said the spiders presented problems. The overhead lamps on the set had to be turned up high, leading to the deaths of 24 tarantulas. They were directed with little puffs of air, a technique which had been used previously in Arnold's film Tarantula. Despite sources suggesting otherwise, the films did not use the same tarantulas.

Many of the basement scenes were shot on Stage 12 of Universal Studios which, according to Tom Weaver, was one of the largest sound stages in the world at the time. While trying to find a way to simulate giant drops of water landing, Arnold recalled a time when he was a child and found condoms in his father's drawer. Not knowing what they were, he filled them with water and dropped them. Arnold ordered about 100 condoms and placed them on a treadmill so they would drop in sequence. The flood scene was shot on July 2 and 3. There was a 20-minute delay in filming because of a bad camera cable. There was a further delay from 11:05 am to 11:25 am to allow water to drain so a crane could be used properly. These scenes involved nine-hour workdays. When the actors were not filming, they were sent to have publicity shots taken.

The film was originally shot in the standard 4:3 aspect ratio, but midway through filming, on June 22, it was decided that the remaining footage would be shot in 1.75:1. The belief was this would give the film a better look, as a shorter frame would allow the production department to scale down the height of certain props for the special effects. During this period, Grant Williams suffered the first of many injuries on set. On June 22, he reported to the studio hospital with a scratched leg; on June 29, he had to leave the set to be treated for an eye condition; and on July 2 he both had to be driven to the hospital for further treatment for his eyes and was sent to the studio hospital with blisters and scratches from climbing sets. Due to Williams' injuries and some special effects shots being too bright, the film was four days behind schedule and $25,000 over budget.

=== Post-production ===
Special effects shots using black velvet trick photography took three weeks of post-production and were scheduled after the film completed production on July 13, 1956. Warren described the special effects as "hard to assign correctly." Clifford Stine, whose field was process work and rear screen projection, is credited with "special photography". The boat scene at the beginning of the film was shot on Universal's process stage, which allowed for rear screen projection. Shots of Scott in certain scenes, such as his encounter with the mist, were shot with him against a black velvet back drop.

According to Randy Stuart, the film's ending had Williams return to his original size, which Matheson felt was the wrong ending for the story. Arnold argued with Universal over the ending. The studio wanted a happy ending, while he wanted the original ending that had been shot. To decide on which ending to use, a test screening was held to judge the audience's reaction. Lucas said audience review cards from a December 7 preview screening in California included comments reacting to the ending such as: "Should've had a different ending, should've grown again." and "What happened at the end?". On the overall quality of the film, comments included, "Can't you do any better? This is pretty sad." "You scared my son to death." and "This is an insult to the brain power of my two-year old son". The film was released with Arnold's original ending intact. After its release, Mel Danner, manager of the Circle Theater in Waynoka, Oklahoma, noted audiences felt it was a good film, but that Carey should have returned to his original size at the end.

=== Soundtrack ===
The film's title theme was composed by Foster Carling and Earl E. Lawrence and played by Ray Anthony and his Orchestra.

== Release ==
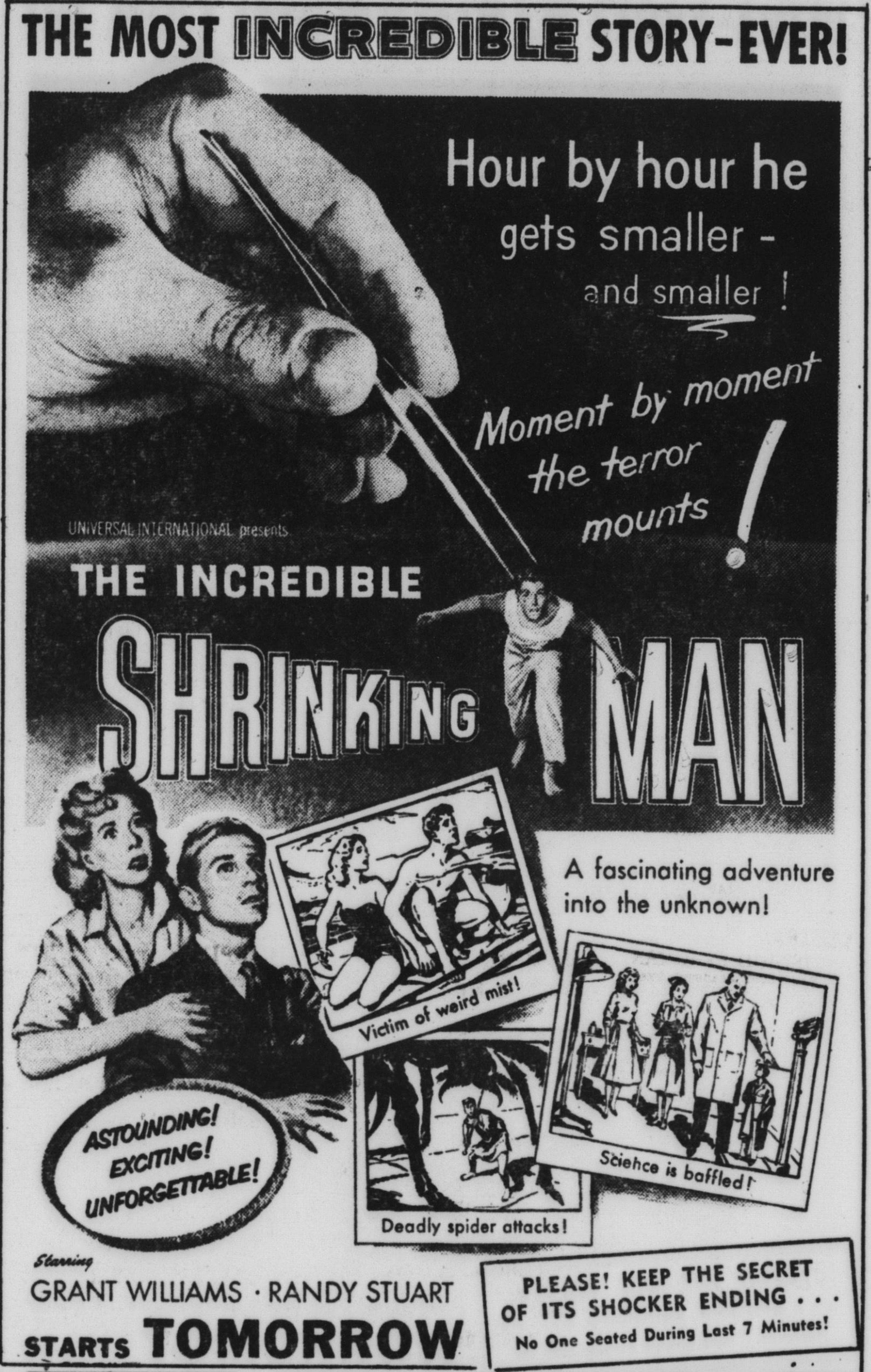
Theatrical advertisement from 1957

The Incredible Shrinking Man premiered at the Globe Theatre in New York City on February 22, 1957. This was followed by a screening in Los Angeles on March 27, 1957, and a wider release in April. Actress Randy Stuart recalled the film was either "second or third, I think third, after The Ten Commandments" in terms of how much money it made against what it cost. Variety reported that by the end of the year it had grossed $1.43 million, making it one of the highest grossing science fiction films of the decade (for comparison, 20,000 Leagues Under the Sea grossed $8 million, Journey to the Center of the Earth grossed $4.8 million, The Thing from Another World grossed $1.95 million, and Invasion of the Body Snatchers grossed $1.2 million).

The film was reissued theatrically in 1964, but otherwise was rarely shown on television and screened only occasionally at science fiction conventions. It was released on LaserDisc in 1978 and 1991, on VHS in 1992, and on DVD in 2006 (as part of a box set containing a collection of Universal-International's science fiction films). Arrow Video released the film on Blu-ray in 2017. In July 2021, The Criterion Collection announced a blu-ray of the film with a new 4K digital restoration; its bonus material includes audio commentary from Tom Weaver and David Schecter.

== Reception ==
Arnold's biographer Dana M. Reemes described The Incredible Shrinking Man as initially being received as a routine to above average film; its reception has steadily grown ever since. Philip K. Scheuer of the Los Angeles Times called the film "a fascinating exercise in imagination, as terrifying as it is funny [...] Science-fiction admirers who are accustomed to finding food for thought as well as vicarious thrills in such flights of fancy will not be disappointed, either." The Monthly Film Bulletin praised the film, and declared it a "horrifying story that grips the imagination throughout", one that "straightforward, macabre, and as startlingly original as a vintage Ray Bradbury short story, for all its peaceful and resigned conclusion—opens new vistas of cosmic terror". Bosley Crowther of The New York Times panned the film, writing that "unless a viewer is addicted to freakish ironies, the unlikely spectacle of Mr. Williams losing an inch of height each week, while his wife, Randy Stuart, looks on helplessly, will become tiresome before Universal has emptied its lab of science-fiction clichés." William Brogdon of Variety commented that the film was not thoroughly satisfactory, but had enough good qualities, specifically declaring "unfoldment is inclined to slow down on occasion, resulting in flagging interest here and there". The review noted the special effects and cinematography were "visually effective", but that "portions of the background score are overworked", which distracted from the plot. The film was the winner of the first Hugo Award for Best Dramatic Presentation in 1958.

Martin Rubin discussed the film in a 1974 issue of Film Comment and compared it to its contemporaries in the genre. He found it did not have the "schoolboy cynicism and moralizing of a Roger Corman film, nor any of the hysteria common to the Red-scare science-fictioners of the Fifties". He felt the story was well-suited to Jack Arnold, noting a "WeIlesian director would have overinflated this film and compromised its sense of the ordinary with shadows and angles, while a more accomplished stylist of almost any other order would have softened it too much—such attitudes are better off in the horror film." Rubin also compared it the other science fiction films Arnold made in the 1950s—The Creature From the Black Lagoon, It Came From Outer Space, Tarantula, Revenge of the Creature, and The Space Children—finding them competitively "interesting in patches", but lacking in comparison to the "unity and clarity" of The Incredible Shrinking Man, which "totally fulfills its central metaphor without being unduly constricted by it".

Ian Nathan of Empire referred to the film as a classic of 1950s science fiction films, and noted how the everyday objects found at home are "transformed into a terrifying vertiginous world fraught with peril. A confrontation with a 'giant' spider, impressively realised, as are all the effects, for its day, has become one of the iconic image[s] of the entire era." Tim Lucas declared that the film "remains one of the perfectly realized science fiction films", noting it was "less about science than a masterful example of the 'what if' branch of speculative human drama".

== Aftermath ==
Arnold commented on science films made after The Incredible Shrinking Man, saying that since his films were financially successful, AIP and Japanese studios developed similar productions, which he felt lacked in atmosphere or morals and were just stories about monsters. These included The Amazing Colossal Man and Attack of the 50 Foot Woman. Arnold was unable to sell a sci-fi story after these films began appearing and went to England to create The Mouse That Roared, which he felt was a fantasy film that still had a deeper meaning to it. Arnold later declared Mouse as his favorite picture and that he thought "almost as much of" it as The Incredible Shrinking Man.

Arnold spoke about the film later in life after watching a revival screening, saying he was happy that audiences enjoyed the film and that they "got all the nuances that I put in. It was a joy to me, just to watch their reaction to the film." Matheson discussed the film in an interview in John Bronsan's Horror People, where he declared he only enjoyed the film after his son pointed out the film's story structure, specifically that "it didn't have the usual story line, the usual happy ending. Actually it had no particular story line, it was very picaresque, it just wandered on." Matheson re-iterated his enjoyment in Cinefantastique, finding himself able to appreciate the film with subsequent watches, finding the visuals as "truly remarkable" and that Arnold created "quite a mood in the film." The film was selected for preservation in the National Film Registry in 2009.

=== Proposed sequels and remakes ===
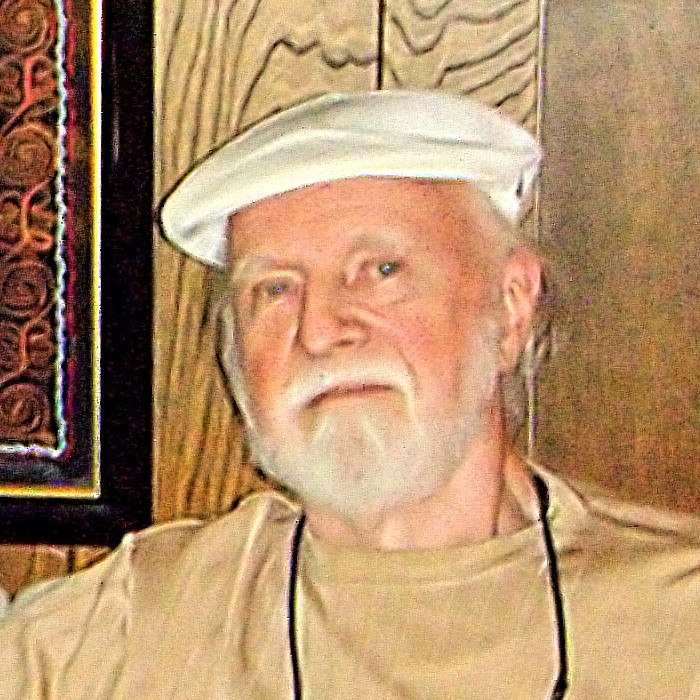
Richard Matheson wrote a follow-up and was developing a new adaptation of his book in 2013.

Matheson scripted a sequel, titled The Fantastic Little Girl. The film has Louise Carey certain that Scott is still alive. She returns home and finds herself shrinking and is injected with a new cure. The script also featured Scott in his microscopic world where he encounters strange eel-like creatures. The script was 43 pages long and described as inferior compared to the original film by author Bill Warren. Matheson said that, since the original film made "a lot of money", he was unsure why the sequel was not developed past the script stage. The script in its entirety was published in the 2005 book Unrealized Dreams. The reluctance for a home media re-release was due to Universal's intention for a pseudo-sequel. This included John Landis developing, writing and directing The Incredible Shrinking Woman, which was cancelled after the budget was found to be too high. It was later revived by Jane Wagner. Arnold said he "hated" The Incredible Shrinking Woman, declaring the special effects weak and adding there was "no point of view...the major fault is that it's not a comedy even though they tried so hard to make it funny".

In 2003, Universal and Imagine Entertainment attempted a remake, with Eddie Murphy to star and Keenen Ivory Wayans to direct. Following this, other directors were attached, including Peter Segal and Brett Ratner, with Murphy still slated to star in a comedic remake.

The source material rights lapsed by 2012 and were purchased by Metro-Goldwyn-Mayer. A new adaptation of The Shrinking Man was announced in 2013, with Matheson writing the screenplay with his son Richard Christian Matheson. The Mathesons commented that the new adaptation would modernise the story and reflect on advancements such as nanotechnology. The elder Matheson died on June 23, 2013.

The Los Angeles-based producer Patrick Wachsberger of Picture Perfect Federation was in France developing a French remake in 2023 starring Jean Dujardin. This new adaptation, titled L'Homme qui rétrécit (lit. The Shrinking Man) was released in October 2025.

== See also ==
- List of American films of 1957
- List of cult films
- List of films featuring miniature people
- List of science fiction films of the 1950s

== Sources ==
- Craig, Rob (2013). It Came from 1957: A Critical Guide to the Year's Science Fiction, Fantasy and Horror Films. McFarland. ISBN 978-1476612430.
- Hardy, Phil, ed. (1984). Science Fiction. Morrow. ISBN 0688008429.
- Keslassy, Elsa (November 3, 2023). "'The Incredible Shrinking Man' Film Adaptation Starring Jean Dujardin Bows Sales at AFM From Patrick Wachsberger's Picture Perfect (Exclusive)". Variety.
- Lucas, Tim (2017). Audio commentary with Tim Lucas (Blu ray). Arrow Films. FCD1628.
- Reemes, David M. (2002). Directed by Jack Arnold. McFarland. ISBN 0786467487.
- Vieira, Mark A. (2003). Hollywood Horror: From Gothic to Cosmic. New York: Harry N. Abrams, Inc. ISBN 0-8109-4535-5.
- Warren, Bill (2009). Keep Watching the Skies!: American Science Fiction Movies of the Fifties, The 21st Century Edition. McFarland. ISBN 978-0786442300.
- Weaver, Tom (2004). Science Fiction and Fantasy Films Flashbacks: Conversations with 24 Actors, Writers, Producers and Directors from the Golden Age. McFarland. ISBN 0786420707.
- Willis, Donald, ed. (1985). Variety's Complete Science Fiction Reviews. Garland Publishing Inc. ISBN 978-0-8240-6263-7.
- Wiseman, Andreas (October 4, 2023). "Patrick Wachsberger Reveals 'Incredible Shrinking Man' Remake With Jean Dujardin, Franchise Hopes For George Clooney Series 'The Department' & Having To Make A Tough Decision On France's Oscar Selection Committee — Zurich Summit Studio". Deadline Hollywood.
- Havis, Allan (2008). Cult Films: Taboo and Transgression. University Press of America. ISBN 978-0761839675.
