= Henry Hasse =

American novelist

Henry Hasse c.1953

Henry Louis Hasse (February 7, 1913 – May 20, 1977) was an American science fiction author and fan. He is probably known best for being the co-author of Ray Bradbury's first professionally published story, "Pendulum", which appeared in November 1941 in Super Science Stories. Hasse co-authored two more published stories with Bradbury: "Gabriel's Horn" (1943) and "Final Victim" (1946).

Hasse's novelette He Who Shrank is anthologized in both the classic 1946 collection Adventures in Time and Space, edited by Raymond J. Healy and J. Francis McComas, and in Isaac Asimov's memoir of 1930s science fiction Before the Golden Age.
