= Harry Bates (writer) =

American novelist

- Born: Hiram Gilmore Bates III; October 9, 1900; Pittsburgh, Pennsylvania, U.S.
- Died: September 1981 (aged 80); New York, U.S.
- Occupations: Editor, author
- Writing career
- Pen name: Anthony Gilmore, H.G. Winter, A.R. Holmes
- Period: 1930–1953
- Genre: Science fiction
- Notable work: "Farewell to the Master"
- Notable awards: First Fandom Hall of Fame; 1976

Hiram Gilmore "Harry" Bates III (October 9, 1900 – September 1981) was an American science fiction editor and writer. His short story "Farewell to the Master" (1940) was the basis of the science fiction movie The Day the Earth Stood Still (1951).

== Biography ==
Harry Bates was born Hiram Gilmore Bates III on October 9, 1900, in Pittsburgh, Pennsylvania. He began working for William Clayton in the 1920s as the editor of adventure pulp magazines. When Clayton proposed a period adventure magazine, Bates suggested several alternatives that he said would be easier to edit, and Astounding Science Fiction was the result. Bates, who was not a fan of science fiction, edited the magazine from its inception in January 1930 until March 1933, when Clayton went bankrupt and the magazine was sold to Street and Smith. During that time, he edited other magazines for Clayton, including Strange Tales, intended to compete with Weird Tales.

Bates had a different opinion of science fiction than Hugo Gernsback, publisher of Amazing Stories. Bates felt that the science needed to be exciting, but not necessarily accurate, and that story and pacing were more important.

Using the pseudonyms Anthony Gilmore and H.G. Winter, Bates and his assistant editor Desmond Winter Hall collaborated on the "Hawk Carse" series and other stories. In 1952, the Hawk Carse stories were collected in Space Hawk: The Greatest of Interplanetary Adventurers. Bates's most famous story is "Farewell to the Master" (Astounding, October 1940), which was the basis for the well-known science fiction movie of 1951, The Day the Earth Stood Still, as well as the 2008 remake and the 1973 Marvel Comics Worlds Unknown series adaptation.

Two novellas by Bates appeared in Gernsback's Science-Fiction Plus, edited by Sam Moskowitz; "The Death of a Sensitive" (May 1953) was ranked by Moskowitz as the best story he ever published in the magazine. Both Gernsback and Moskowitz, however, wanted changes in "The Triggered Dimension" (December 1953), and Bates agreed to make the changes and arrived at the magazine's offices at 25 West Broadway to do the revisions.

That same year Moskowitz began teaching what is believed to be the first college course on science fiction at City College. Bates had agreed to speak as a guest lecturer for the first class. As retaliation for the revision of his story, however, Bates intentionally did not go to the class, resulting in considerable awkwardness for Moskowitz. Moskowitz recalled later:

Seven years later, I received a letter from Harry Bates dated October 2, 1960. In essence, it revealed that Bates was now totally disabled due to progressive arthritis and was trying to get early Social Security at 60. He had a doctor's statement that he was suffering from that condition at present, but they wanted proof that it was progressive and prevented him from writing stories for income. He asked if I would be willing to supply a statement that he had written stories for me with the greatest difficulty. He didn't know if he had ever mentioned it to me, but any validation would help. It so happened that he had shown me his swollen knuckles in 1953, but beyond that, I had a letter from him describing the difficulty, written earlier that year. I mailed him back the letter, for which I still had the dated envelope, and he got his Social Security—his only income for the next 20 years! Christmas of 1962 I received a card from him on which he scrawled: "I ain't mad at you no more."

In 1964, Bates contributed an introductory essay, Editorial Number One, "To Begin", along with John W. Campbell, to A Requiem for Astounding by Alva Rogers, which examined the history of the science fiction magazine Astounding.

Writer Avram Davidson credited Bates as an early influence, stating that "I will admit to the bibliography something done when I was twelve, entitled 'The Slaveship from Space'. It was modeled after a magazine story entitled, curiously enough, 'The Slaveship from Space', and I believe the imitation was fully as bad as the original—no mean feat, I can assure you."

Bates died in September, 1981, at the age of 80.

== The Day the Earth Stood Still ==
In 1951, Twentieth Century Fox released the movie The Day the Earth Stood Still, which was based on Bates' 1940 short story "Farewell to the Master". The science fiction movie featured Michael Rennie as Klaatu, Patricia Neal, Sam Jaffe, Hugh Marlowe, and Lock Martin as the giant alien robot Gort, called Gnut in Bates' short story. The movie was directed by Robert Wise and produced by Julian Blaustein. Screenwriter Edmund H. North adapted Bates' short story for the screen. The movie is rated consistently by critics as one of the greatest science fiction movies ever made.

The critical and commercial success of the 1951 movie relied on the novel themes Bates introduced in his short story. Ever since H.G. Wells' The War of the Worlds (1898), aliens were often described as menacing, aggressive, and murderous, with a degraded moral and ethical sense. In Bates' story, aliens are the opposite, possessing a good moral character. The alien Klaatu's face "radiated kindness, wisdom, the purest nobility. In his delicately tinted robe he looked like a benign god." The giant alien robot, Gnut in the short story, Gort in the film, is immensely powerful, but can exhibit sadness and gentleness. In the surprise ending, Gnut tells the journalist, who is relating the story, "You misunderstand, ... I am the master".

While The Day the Earth Stood Still is inspired by Bates' short story, the 1951 context of the Cold War resulted in some changes to the story's themes. In the movie, Klaatu seeks to promote peace and to warn mankind of the dangers of science and technology when they are exploited and corrupted. The alien explains that Gort is a member of a race of all-powerful robots who were created to eliminate any civilizations which promoted warfare in space.

During 1983, The Day the Earth Stood Still was inducted into the Science Fiction Film Hall of Fame as part of the Balrog Awards, which were given from 1979 to 1985.

In 2008, director Scott Derrickson remade The Day the Earth Stood Still. The movie starred Keanu Reeves as the alien Klaatu and Jennifer Connelly as Dr. Helen Benson. David Scarpa wrote the screenplay based on Edmund H. North's 1951 screenplay.

== Hawk Carse short stories ==
Under the pseudonym of Anthony Gilmore, Bates wrote the following stories in the Hawk Carse series with Desmond W. Hall, collected in Space Hawk: The Greatest of Interplanetary Adventurers (New York: Greenberg, 1952):

- "Hawk Carse", Astounding, November, 1931
- "The Affair of the Brains", Astounding, March, 1932
- "The Bluff of the Hawk", Astounding, May, 1932
- "The Passing of Ku Sui", Astounding, November, 1932

Boucher and McComas described the 1952 collection as "strongly commended to all connoisseurs of prose so outrageously bad as to reach its own kind of greatness." P. Schuyler Miller described the stories as "space opera of the old, raw, gloves-off school [including] every cliche of the period," concluding "Hawk Carse was so bad that he was almost good." Everett F. Bleiler characterized the series as "traditional pulp Western stories transplanted into space, with the addition of an Oriental villain in the mode of Sax Rohmer's Dr. Fu-Manchu."

Ten years later, Amazing Stories printed in July 1942 the final Hawk Carse novelette, "The Return of Hawk Carse", written by Bates alone. This story has never been collected or reprinted.

== Science fiction stories ==
Harry Bates wrote the following science fiction short stories:

- "The Hands of Aten", with Desmond W. Hall, under the pseudonym H.G. Winter, 1931
- "The Slave Ship from Space", with the pseudonym A.R. Holmes, 1931
- "The Tentacles from Below", with Desmond W. Hall, as Anthony Gilmore, 1931
- "Four Miles Within", with Desmond W. Hall, as Anthony Gilmore, 1931
- "The Midget from the Island", with Desmond W. Hall, as H.G. Winter, 1931
- "Seed of the Arctic Ice", with Desmond W. Hall, as H.G. Winter, 1932
- "A Scientist Rises", with Desmond W. Hall, Astounding, November 1932
- "The Coffin Ship", with Desmond W. Hall, as Anthony Gilmore, 1933
- "Under Arctic Ice", with Desmond W. Hall, as H.G. Winter, 1933
- "A Matter of Size", Astounding, April 1934
- "Alas, All Thinking", Astounding, June 1935
- "The Experiment of Dr. Sarconi", Thrilling Wonder Stories, July 1940
- "Farewell to the Master", Astounding, October 1940
- "A Matter of Speed", Astounding, June 1941
- "The Mystery of the Blue God", Amazing Stories, January 1942
- "The Death of a Sensitive", Science Fiction Plus, May 1953
- "The Triggered Dimension", Science Fiction Plus, December 1953

== Essays ==
- "Introducing: Astounding Stories", 1930
- "Editorial: Just Around the Corner", 1933
- "Editorial: The Expanding Universe", 1933
- "Meet the Authors: Harry Bates", 1942
- Editorial Number One, "To Begin", in A Requiem for Astounding by Alva Rogers, with editorial comments by Harry Bates, F. Orlin Tremaine, and John W. Campbell. Chicago: Advent Publishers, 1964.

== As magazine editor ==
- Astounding Stories of Super-Science, 1930
- Astounding Stories, 1931
- Astounding Stories, 1932
- Strange Tales of Mystery and Terror, October, 1932
- Astounding Stories of Super-Science, 1933
