= The Shrinking Man =

1956 novel by Richard Matheson

- First edition
- Author: Richard Matheson
- Cover artist: Mitchell Hooks
- Language: English
- Genre: Science fiction
- Publisher: Gold Medal Books
- Publication date: 1956
- Publication place: United States
- Media type: Print
- Pages: 192

The Shrinking Man is a science fiction novel by American writer Richard Matheson, published in 1956. The novel was retitled The Incredible Shrinking Man in some later editions.

The novel has been adapted into a motion picture three times: in 1957 as The Incredible Shrinking Man; in 1981 as The Incredible Shrinking Woman; and a 2025 French-language version entitled L'Homme qui rétrécit. The first two adaptations were produced by Universal Pictures, and the 2025 version was directed by Jan Kounen.

In 2012 it was included (under the original title) in the Library of America two-volume boxed set American Science Fiction: Nine Classic Novels of the 1950s, edited by Gary K. Wolfe.

== Plot summary ==
While on holiday, Scott Carey is exposed to a cloud of radioactive spray shortly after he accidentally ingests insecticide. The radioactivity acts as a catalyst for the bug spray, causing his body to shrink at a rate of approximately 1/7 inch (3.6 mm) per day. A few weeks later, Carey can no longer deny the truth: not only is he losing weight, he is also shorter than he was and deduces, to his dismay, that his body will continue to shrink.

The abnormal size decrease of his body initially brings teases and taunting from local youths, then causes friction in his marriage and family life, because he loses the respect his family has for him because of his diminishing physical stature. Ultimately, as the shrinking continues, it begins to threaten Carey's life as well; at seven inches (18 cm) tall, he is driven outdoors, where he is attacked by a sparrow in his garden; the conflict drives him through a window into the cellar of his house. He has to survive on tiny scraps of food and bits of water. At one point he has to try and jump to reach a hanging spar of wood one-half inch (13 mm) away—a leap whose distance seems over four feet (1.2 m) away to him. A cat goes after him when he is about 4/7 inch (15 mm) tall. He is forced to engage in a victorious battle with a black widow spider that towers over him, which Carey ultimately kills.

As Carey continues shrinking, he realizes that his original fear that he would shrink into non-existence is incorrect; that he will continue to shrink, but will not disappear as he originally feared, his epiphanic thought being, "If nature existed on endless levels, so also might intelligence."

== Structure ==
The story is told in a fractured timeline style, beginning with Carey's exposure to radiation and then shifting between his minuscule form trapped in the cellar of his home and looking for food while battling the spider; and the time and events leading up to his finding himself there. The novel is arranged in 17 chapters, with occasional segments documenting Carey's shrinking, using subheads describing height: 68", 64", etc., ultimately leading to 7" in Chapter 15, wherein the entrapment in the cellar is finally described.

== Inspiration ==
Author Richard Matheson says he was initially inspired to write the story from a scene in the comedy film Let's Do It Again. "I had gotten the idea several years earlier while attending a movie in a Redondo Beach theater. In this particular scene, Ray Milland, leaving Jane Wyman's apartment in a huff, accidentally put on Aldo Ray's hat, which sank down around his ears. Something in me asked, 'What would happen if a man put on a hat which he knew was his and the same thing happened?' Thus the notion came."

== Analysis ==
The novel raises questions of what it means to be a man in 1950s white middle class suburban America, and the fears associated with not acting like a man, as imagined through the fantastical idea of slowly shrinking in height. As Scott Carey shrinks, he experiences estrangement with his own body, and in his relationships with people around him. As he shrinks in size he loses confidence in his masculinity and becomes intimidated by his wife, child, and even pet cat. His place as head of the house ebbs away until he is banished to the basement, unable to go to work. Normal objects appear alien and threatening, such as the oil burner that causes him pain from the sound, or the spider which chases him. As Jancovich says:

His fears are presented as the result of his failure to recognize and dispense with his concepts of "normality", particularly those concepts of normality which are associated with the role of the "normal" middle-class masculinity in the 1950s.

Carey's notion of masculinity is based on his notion of man's superiority over women, and he fears losing his privileges along with his height. He sees himself becoming something other, a child or feminine, such as in the scene with the child molester in the car, or beaten-up by the local roughs. He compensates by lusting after the adolescent baby sitter, but this backfires when he is caught and shamed, leading to a deeper blow to his ego. He fears becoming an object of desire by others, such as in his fears of becoming a media spectacle. "He fears losing his superiority and significance as a man, and becoming subordinate to others' power and authority." The novel turns on his ability to overcome these fears, characterized by attempting to find food, kill the spider and escape the basement, and in the process achieve a new normality beyond his former strait-jacketed white middle class suburban role as family man.

== Reception ==
Dave Pringle reviewing The Incredible Shrinking Man for Imagine magazine, stated, "Enjoy the believable domestic details which follow as the protagonist finds he is no longer a man to his wife and ends up as a scurrying insect beneath her feet. It is like Kafka transposed to an Ideal Home selling."

== See also ==
- 1956 in science fiction
- He Who Shrank

== Reviews ==
- Review by The Editor (1956) in The Magazine of Fantasy and Science Fiction, September 1956
- Review by P. Schuyler Miller (1956) in Astounding Science Fiction, November 1956
- Review by Damon Knight (1956) in Future Science Fiction, #31, Winter 1956-1957
- Review by Villiers Gerson (1957) in Fantastic, February 1957
- Review by P. Schuyler Miller (1970) in Analog Science Fiction/Science Fact, August 1970
- Review by Peter Brigg (1979) in Science Fiction & Fantasy Book Review, November 1979
- Review [German] by uncredited (1982) in Reclams Science Fiction Führer
- Review by David Pringle (1988) in Modern Fantasy: The Hundred Best Novels
- Review by Nicholas Mahoney (1989) in Paperback Inferno, #78
- Review [French] by Christo Datso (1999) in Galaxies, #14
- Review by Chris Hill (2001) in Vector 217
- Review by uncredited (2003) in Vector 229
- Review by Darrell Bain (2005) in My 100 Most Readable (and Re-Readable) Science Fiction Novels
- Review by Charles Dee Mitchell (2014) in Big Sky, #3: SF Masterworks 1
- Review by J. P. Lantern (2014) in Big Sky, #3: SF Masterworks 1
- Review [French] by Bruno Para (2017) in Bifrost, #86
