= Raymond J. Healy =

American anthologist (1907–1997)

Raymond John Healy
- Occupations: Anthologist, editor

Raymond John Healy (September 21, 1907 – July 17, 1997) was an American anthologist who edited four science fiction anthologies from 1946 to 1955, two with J. Francis McComas. Their first collaboration, Adventures in Time and Space, (1946) is generally recognized as the finest early anthology from the Golden Age of Science Fiction.

== Books edited ==
- Adventures in Time and Space (1946), with J. Francis McComas
- New Tales of Space and Time (1951)
- 9 Tales of Space and Time (1954)
- Selections from Adventures in Time and Space (1954), paperback, subset of stories from the hardback
- More Adventures in Time and Space (1955), paperback, subset of stories from the hardback
