= Klaatu barada nikto =

Iconic phrase from The Day the Earth Stood Still

- Script page of The Day the Earth Stood Still (1951) showing the phrase
- Character: Klaatu (first); Helen Benson (second)
- Actor: Michael Rennie, Patricia Neal
- Written by: Edmund H. North
- First used in: The Day the Earth Stood Still

"Klaatu barada nikto" is a phrase that originated in the 1951 science fiction film The Day the Earth Stood Still. The humanoid alien protagonist of the film, Klaatu (Michael Rennie), instructs Helen Benson (Patricia Neal) that if any harm befalls him, she must say the phrase to the robot Gort (Lockard Martin).

The Robot Hall of Fame describes the phrase as "one of the most famous commands in science fiction" and Frederick S. Clarke of Cinefantastique called it "the most famous phrase ever spoken by an extraterrestrial."

== Usage in the film ==
Edmund H. North, who wrote The Day the Earth Stood Still, also created the alien language used in the film, including the phrase "Klaatu barada nikto". The official spelling of the phrase comes directly from the script. The phrase was never translated in the film and neither North nor 20th Century Fox ever released an official translation.

Near the end of the film, as Klaatu is pursued by the U.S. Armed Forces, he urges Helen Benson to memorize the phrase, saying "There's no limit to what he can do. He could destroy the Earth... If anything should happen to me, you must go to Gort; you must say these words: 'Klaatu barada nikto.' Please repeat that."

Shortly after, Klaatu is shot and killed. Knowing that Klaatu has died, Gort vaporizes the polymer cube encasing him and kills the two soldiers standing guard. Helen conveys Klaatu's message. Gort takes her inside the spaceship, and then retrieves Klaatu's lifeless body, which he revives.

In the 2008 remake, the line was added at Keanu Reeves's insistence. Klaatu uses it near the beginning of the film to shut down Gort, and again at the end, highly distorted and barely audible, when he stops the destruction of the Earth.

== Interpretation ==
Because there is no official translation of the phrase, a few notable attempts have been made to determine the phrase's meaning:

Philosophy professor Aeon J. Skoble speculates the phrase is part of a fail-safe feature used during diplomatic missions, whereby Gort's deadly force can be deactivated in the event the robot is undesirably triggered into a defensive posture. Skoble observes that this theme has evolved into a "staple of science fiction that the machines charged with protecting us from ourselves will misuse or abuse their power." In this interpretation the phrase apparently tells Gort that Klaatu considers escalation unnecessary (stand down and return home).

Fantastic Films explored the meaning of "Klaatu barada nikto" in the 1978 article "The Language of Klaatu". In the article Tauna Le Marbe, the magazine's Alien Linguistics Editor, attempts to translate all the alien words Klaatu used throughout the film. Le Marbe's literal translation was "Stop Barbarism, (I have) death, bind;" the free translation was "I die, repair me, do not retaliate."

The documentary Decoding "Klaatu Barada Nikto": Science Fiction as Metaphor examined the phrase Klaatu barada nikto with some of the people involved with The Day the Earth Stood Still. Robert Wise, director of the original, recalled a conversation he had with Edmund North, saying North told him, "...it's just something I kind of cooked up. I thought it sounded good."

Billy Gray, who played Bobby Benson in the film, said that "barada nikto must mean... save Earth". Florence Blaustein, widow of the producer Julian Blaustein, said North had to pass a street called Baroda every day going to work and said, "I think that's how that was born." Film historian Steven Jay Rubin recalled an interview he had with North when he asked the question, "What is the direct translation of 'Klaatu barada nikto?' And Edmund North said to me, 'There's hope for Earth, if the scientists can be reached.'"

In accepting the AFI Life Achievement Award in 1998, director Robert Wise closed his remarks by saying, "...I'd like to say 'Klaatu barada nikto', which, roughly translated tonight, means 'Thank you very much from the bottom of my heart.'"

== Popular culture references ==
- In the 1983 film Return of the Jedi, one of Jabba the Hutt's employees is "Barada", a member of the "Klatooinian" species, both the character and the species being references to the phrase. In the Star Wars universe, there is also a species called "Nikto". Another of Jabba the Hutt's employees is a character named "Klaatu", himself a member of the "Nikto" species.
- In the 1984 stage play The Foreigner, the lead character is Charlie Baker, a science fiction proofreader on holiday. He mentions the phrase early in the play, and then during the climactic confrontation makes use of it as a way to sound otherworldly and threatening.
- In the 1987 animated series episode of Teenage Mutant Ninja Turtles titled "Invasion of the Turtle Snatchers," Donatello meets an alien family with the father's name Klaatu, mother Barada, and son Nikto.
- In the 1992 film Army of Darkness, Ash Williams must correctly recite the phrase in order to safely retrieve the Necronomicon. Later in the film, he must precisely recite it again to travel back to his time period. Both times the pronunciation was mangled and resulted in unexpected outcomes.
- In the 2003 video game Rayman 3: Hoodlum Havoc during the level The Longest Shortcut, Globox calls out the phrase "Klaatu barada nikto" among various other random pop cultural quotes in the hopes of stumbling on the right magic words to open the locked doors.
- In the 2004 video game Spider-Man 2 based on the movie of the same name, Mysterio, who in this interpretation of the villain portrays himself as an alien in the style of 1950s B movies such as The Day the Earth Stood Still, cryptically utters the phrase "klaatu barada nikto" as a hologram of Mysterio watches over Spider-Man rescuing civilians from a burning theatre, simultaneously referencing the original movie and Sam Raimi's Army of Darkness, as Raimi also directed Spider-Man 2.
- Willie Nile uses the phrase in the bridge of his song "The Day the Earth Stood Still" from his 2021 album of the same name.
- In the 2022 film Sonic the Hedgehog 2, Doctor Robotnik recites the phrase before manually activating a trap that dispatches an alien savenger to facilitate his escape from the Mushroom Planet.
