= Gort (The Day the Earth Stood Still) =

Fictional robot

- The Day the Earth Stood Still character
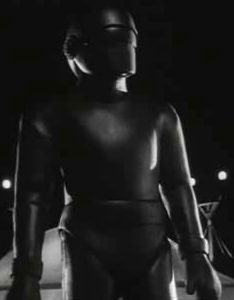
- Gort, as portrayed by Lock Martin in The Day the Earth Stood Still (1951)
- First appearance: The Day the Earth Stood Still (1951)
- Created by: Edmund H. North, loosely based on a concept by Harry Bates
- Portrayed by: Lock Martin

In-universe information
- Nickname: "Iron man"
- Species: Humanoid robot
- Gender: Male
- Occupation: Law Enforcement
- Nationality: Unnamed planetary confederation

Gort is a fictional humanoid robot that appeared first in the 1951 American science fiction film The Day the Earth Stood Still and later in its 2008 remake. His depiction varies between film adaptations.

== Appearances ==
=== Farewell to the Master (1940) ===
In "Farewell to the Master", a 1940 Astounding Science Fiction short story written by Harry Bates and used as the basis for Edmund H. North's later screenplay, the character Gnut is similar to North's Gort but different in important ways. Gnut is a moving green metal statue that is apparently attendant upon Klaatu, but in the terminus of the story is identified as the eponymous "master" over Klaatu.

Gnut is described with a much more human appearance, with musculature and emotional expressions. He is described in the fourth paragraph of the short story as 8 ft (2.4 m) tall. Comparisons are made between Gnut and robots, but only as a means of differentiating from the crudity of those built by humans while Gnut appears human in several respects. For example, Gnut walks with an "almost jerkless rhythm which only he among robots possessed", and his hands have "tough metal fingers".

Particular attention is given to describing Gnut's eyes, which are "internally illuminated red eyes [that] were so set that every observer felt they were fixed on himself alone". Toward the end of the short story Gnut's face is described with "metal muscles". This differs dramatically from both movie depictions, which use a visor to represent Gort's eyes but give him very few other facial features. Gnut speaks to the main character at the end of the short story, while in the movie depictions there is no indication that he is able to speak.

=== The Day the Earth Stood Still (1951) ===
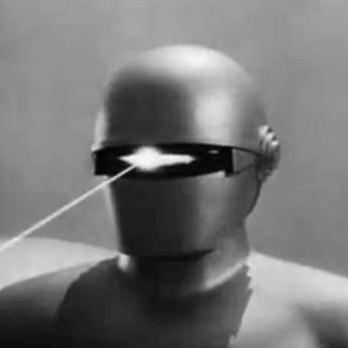
Gort firing his beam weapon

Gort is an 8-foot (2.4 m) tall robot apparently constructed from a single piece of "flexible metal". He is but one member of a "race of robots" invented by an interplanetary confederation (described as "a sort of United Nations on a planetary level" by Klaatu, who is a representative of that confederation) to protect their citizens against all aggression by destroying any aggressors. Klaatu describes "him" as one of an interstellar police force, holding irrevocable powers to "preserve the peace" by destroying any aggressor. The fear of provoking these robots acts as a deterrent against aggression. To that end, Gort accompanies Klaatu on his mission to deliver an ultimatum to the people of Earth: the interplanetary confederation is not concerned with internal human politics; however, if humanity threatens to use atomic weapons against the other planets, the Earth will be destroyed to ensure the safety of the other planets.

Gort does not speak, but he can receive and follow verbal commands (including the famous dialog line "Klaatu barada nikto", spoken by actor Patricia Neal's character toward the end of the film), as well as non-verbal commands: at one point, Klaatu communicates with him using reflected signals from a borrowed flashlight. This is not the end of his capability, though, as Gort is also shown acting entirely on his own, both to protect Klaatu from harm and to free himself from encasement in a block of plastic. Gort can also operate highly complex machinery, and is both the pilot and captain of the ship that delivers Klaatu to Earth; all of his "race" have similar ships that they use to patrol the planets.

Seemingly unarmed, Gort is in fact armed with a laser-like weapon that is projected from beneath a visor on his head. The weapon "melted several soldier's [sic] guns from their hands while not harming the soldiers at all, and seconds later was used to melt tanks and artillery without harming their occupants or any surrounding objects." Gort is also continually aware of Klaatu's physical condition and location without Klaatu needing to wear a tracking device of any sort. Gort is not known to be damageable by any means available to mankind, and can – despite resistance – destroy the Earth itself if he is sufficiently provoked. During most of the film, Gort remains motionless in front of his ship, which rests in a baseball park in central Washington, D.C., near the White House. Scientists and military researchers attempt to examine both the robot and the ship.

The robot was portrayed by actor Lock Martin whose height was 7 feet 7 inches (2.3 m). He wore a thick foam-rubber suit designed and built by Addison Hehr. Two suits were created, fastened alternately from the front or back so that the robot would appear seamless from any angle in the completed scenes (although he walks past the camera during the scene in which Gort picks up Neal, and the front seam is briefly visible). A fiberglass statue of Gort was also used for the close-ups of the firing of his energy beam weapon or when a scene required him to stand still. To maximize the height of the robot, the Gort suit was made with lifts in the boots. Martin could see forward through the suit's visor area during certain shots, and air holes were provided for him under the robot's wide chin and jaw, and these can be seen in several close-ups of Gort's head.

=== The Day the Earth Stood Still (2008) ===
Gort, as seen in the 2008 remake, with the redesigned spaceship in background

The nature of Gort was altered in the 2008 remake of The Day the Earth Stood Still. Gort's name was revised to add an acronym, "Genetically Organized Robotic Technology", assigned to it by United States military and scientists; the idea that the name is an acronym is only mentioned once. G.O.R.T. is much taller than Gort at 28 ft (8.5 m) vs. the original's 8 ft (2.4 m). As in the previous film but unlike the story, G.O.R.T. does not speak. Unlike the previous movie, G.O.R.T. arrives to save the Earth from humanity: if the human race does not change its ecological destructiveness by a certain time, the robot will destroy humanity to save the Earth's biosphere. G.O.R.T. is neutralized by Klaatu at the end of the film with a massive electromagnetic pulse (EMP).

G.O.R.T. is composed of a vast swarm of microscopic insect-like devices that can replicate through the consumption of matter and energy. These nano-machines can consume any substance they touch and can crawl or fly. They can be used as a doomsday weapon, able to consume all material on a planet. In addition to this mode of attack, G.O.R.T. possesses a laser weapon under a visor-like slit in its "face", which can also be used to hack unmanned aerial vehicles (such as General Atomics MQ-1 Predator drones). It can also generate debilitating high-frequency sound and an electromagnetic field that disrupts all electrical devices in a wide radius.

Unlike the 1951 version, the 2008 G.O.R.T. is all computer-generated imagery (CGI), and has five digits on each hand, instead of the mitten-style hands of the 1951 robot; his feet, however, have no digits. Features such as the cuffs, belt, visor, and boots of the 1951 Gort are gone. The 2008 G.O.R.T. has a simpler overall surface design that in close-up appears to be in constant motion due to its nanorobotic composition.

== Analysis ==
Owen Gleiberman writes that "Gort isn't so lovey-dovey" in the remake; rather, "he's like a super-tall, obsidian Oscar statue wreaking havoc." At the insistence of Keanu Reeves, the phrase "Klaatu barada nikto" was included in the remake (Keanu says the words when Gort reacts to his shooting, although the words are very distorted).

== Cultural references ==
A life-size replica of the 1951 Gort is on display at the Science Fiction Museum and Hall of Fame in Seattle, Washington; as well as at the Carnegie Science Center in Pittsburgh, Pennsylvania, at the Robot Hall of Fame.

Jesse Eisenberg voices a parody of the character named Dort in the 2026 animated film Minions & Monsters.

== See also ==
- List of fictional robots and androids
