= The Day the Earth Stood Still (2008 film) =

Science fiction film by Scott Derrickson

- Theatrical release poster
- Directed by: Scott Derrickson
- Screenplay by: David Scarpa
- Based on: The Day the Earth Stood Still by Edmund H. North (Note: The 1951 film is based on the 1940 short story "Farewell to the Master" by Harry Bates)
- Produced by: Erwin Stoff; Gregory Goodman; Paul Harris Boardman
- Starring: Keanu Reeves; Jennifer Connelly; Jaden Smith; John Cleese; Jon Hamm; Kathy Bates
- Cinematography: David Tattersall
- Edited by: Wayne Wahrman
- Music by: Tyler Bates
- Production companies: 20th Century Fox; 3 Arts Entertainment; Dune Entertainment
- Distributed by: 20th Century Fox
- Release date: December 12, 2008
- Running time: 103 minutes
- Country: United States
- Language: English
- Budget: $80 million
- Box office: $233.1 million

The Day the Earth Stood Still is a 2008 American science fiction film serving as a remake of the 1951 film of the same name, which, in turn, was based on the 1940 short story "Farewell to the Master". Directed by Scott Derrickson from a screenplay by David Scarpa, it stars Keanu Reeves as Klaatu, an alien sent to try to change human behavior in an effort to save Earth from environmental degradation; this version replaces the Cold War–era theme of potential nuclear warfare with the contemporary issue of negative human impact on the environment. It co-stars Jennifer Connelly, Jaden Smith, John Cleese, Jon Hamm, and Kathy Bates.

The Day the Earth Stood Still was originally scheduled for release on May 9, 2008, but was released on a roll-out schedule beginning December 12, 2008, screening in both conventional and IMAX theaters. The film was met with mixed reviews from critics but was a box office success, grossing $233.1 million worldwide against its $80 million production budget.

== Plot ==
In 1928, a solitary mountaineer exploring the Karakoram mountains in India encounters a glowing sphere. He loses consciousness and when he wakes, the sphere is gone and there is a scar on his hand.

In the present day, a rapidly moving object detected beyond Jupiter's orbit is predicted to collide with Earth, destroying all life. The U.S. government assembles a group of scientists including Helen Benson and her friend Michael Granier to develop a survival plan. The object slows down and descends in Manhattan, revealing itself to be a large spherical spaceship. Helen and the scientists respond to the scene with military forces. An alien emerges and Helen moves forward to greet it, but amidst the confusion, the alien is shot. A gigantic humanoid robot appears and emits a high-pitched disabling signal. The wounded alien voices the command "Klaatu barada nikto" to shut down the robot's defensive response.

The scientists take the alien to a laboratory and discover its skin is a bioengineered space suit composed of placenta-like material covering a human-like being. After the bullet is extracted, the being ages into Klaatu, resembling the mountaineer from 1928. Klaatu informs Secretary of Defense Regina Jackson that a group of planetary civilizations sent him to Earth to discuss saving the planet from ecocide. When Jackson sends him for interrogation, Klaatu escapes and reconnects with Helen and her stepson, Jacob, telling them he must finish his mission to "save the Earth".

The emergence of smaller spheres around the world causes widespread public panic. Military drone attacks on the main sphere are thwarted by the robot and the military adopts a weapons-free approach, cautiously enclosing the robot now nicknamed "GORT" (Genetically Organized Robotic Technology). The robot is transported to the Mount Weather underground facility in Virginia.

Klaatu meets with another alien, Mr. Wu, who has lived on Earth for years and describes humans as destructive, stubborn, and unwilling to change, matching Klaatu's perceptions. Mr. Wu adds that he intends to remain on Earth, as he has grown to love the people. Klaatu orders the smaller spheres to collect animal specimens for preservation and later reintroduction to the Earth and tells Helen he intends to save the planet from destruction by humans.

Hoping to change Klaatu's perceptions of humanity, Helen takes him to Nobel Prize recipient Professor Barnhardt. They discuss how Klaatu's race went through drastic, collaborative evolution to prevent the demise of their planet. Barnhardt pleads that Earth is at the same precipice, and humanity should be given a chance to understand that it, too, must change. While the adults are talking, Jacob calls the authorities to come and arrest Klaatu.

While the military is examining GORT, the robot transforms into a swarm of winged insect-like nano-machines that self-replicate as they consume every man-made object in their path. The swarm devours the entire facility and emerges above ground to continue feeding.

The military captures Helen while Klaatu and Jacob escape on foot. As they travel, Klaatu learns more about humanity through Jacob. When Jacob contacts Helen and arranges to meet at his father's grave, the Secretary sends her to try to change Klaatu's mind. At the grave, Jacob is heartbroken that Klaatu cannot resurrect his long-dead father. As Helen and Jacob reunite, Klaatu's cumulative observations of humans convince him to stop the swarm.

Granier drives them to the Central Park sphere, but the swarm has reached massive proportions. Klaatu trudges through the swarm to the sphere, touching it moments before his own body is consumed. The sphere deactivates the swarm, saving humanity, but also shutting down all electronics on Earth as the giant sphere leaves the planet.

== Cast ==
- Keanu Reeves as Klaatu, an alien messenger in human form. Reeves dislikes remakes, but was impressed by the script, which he deemed a reimagining. He enjoyed the original film as a child and became fonder of it as an adult when he understood how relevant it was. Reeves acknowledged his Klaatu is "inverted" from the original, starting "sinister and tough", but becoming "more human", whereas the original was "more human than human" before revealing his "big stick" in his ending speech. He compared the remake's Klaatu to the wrathful God who floods the world in the Old Testament, but is gentle and forgiving by the time of the New Testament. He spent many weeks revising the script, trying to make Klaatu's transition from alien in human form to one who appreciates their emotions and beliefs subtle and nuanced. Derrickson, the director, said that although Reeves would not use actions "that are highly unusual or highly quirky," he nevertheless "keeps you aware of the fact that this being you're walking through this movie with is not a human being". At Reeves' insistence, the line "Klaatu barada nikto" was added to the script after initially being omitted. The line was recorded many times, and it was decided to combine two recordings: one where Reeves said it normally and a reversed version where he said the line backward, creating an "alien" effect.
- Jennifer Connelly as Helen Benson, an astrobiologist at Princeton University, who is recruited by the government to study Klaatu. Connelly was Derrickson's first choice for the part. She is a fan of the original film and felt Patricia Neal's original portrayal of Helen was "fabulous," but trusted the filmmakers with their reinterpretation of the story and of Helen, who was a secretary in the original. Connelly emphasized that Helen is amazed when she meets Klaatu, as she never believed she would encounter a sentient alien like him after speculating on extraterrestrial life for so long. Connelly was dedicated to understanding her scientific jargon, with Seth Shostak stating she did "everything short of writing a NASA grant application."
- Jaden Smith as Jacob Benson, Helen's eight-year old stepson. Jacob replaces the character of Bobby (Billy Gray) in the original, and his relationship with Helen was written as a microcosm of how Klaatu comes to see humanity—the alien sees their cold and distant relationship as normal human behavior, and their reconciliation forces him to change his mind. Smith said he found Jacob difficult to play because he felt the character "opposite" to his personality. Smith had met Reeves before on the set of the Matrix sequels, which featured his mother, Jada Pinkett-Smith.
- John Cleese as Professor Karl Barnhardt, a Nobel Prize–winning physicist, who specializes in the evolutionary basis of altruism. Helen takes Klaatu to him to further change his mind. The role was the most difficult to cast, and eventually the filmmakers decided to approach Cleese, noting "Who would you rather make the argument [to Klaatu] for mankind than John Cleese?" Stoff, a producer, had met Cleese a few times beforehand and had noted his intellect. The actor was surprised the filmmakers were interested in him, and decided playing a dramatic role would be easier than to play a comedic one at his age. He was often reminded to speed up his dialogue so that Reeves would not appear in synchronicity with normal human speech patterns. Cleese said he is not interested in extraterrestrial life because he often philosophizes about the purpose of life and why humans are distracted by trivial matters. Cleese spoke about portraying abilities outside his own experience in the scene in which Klaatu corrects a complex mathematical formula Barnhardt has written on a blackboard: "The trouble is, I had to be able to write the equation, because Barnhardt has been working on it for 60 years. I learned to carefully copy things down that mean nothing to me at all. In A Fish Called Wanda, I spoke a lot of Russian without having any idea what it means." The crew enjoyed working with Cleese and were sad when he finished filming his part.
- Jon Hamm as Michael Granier, a NASA official, who recruits Helen into his scientific team investigating Klaatu. Granier is fascinated by Klaatu, but is torn between his official obligation to detain the alien and protect his country. Hamm acknowledged science fiction was a niche genre when the original film was made, and that it used science fiction to make topical issues more approachable. He had the same feelings for this remake. Originally, his character was French and named Michel. Although he is interested in math and science, Hamm found his technical dialogue difficult and had to film his lines repeatedly.
- Kathy Bates as Regina Jackson, the United States Secretary of Defense. Bates had only two weeks to film her scenes, so she often requested Derrickson act out her lines so she could directly understand his aims for her dialogue.
- Kyle Chandler as John Driscoll
- Robert Knepper as Colonel Addelman
- James Hong as Mr. Wu, an alien living in the United States
- John Rothman as Dr. Myron
- Brandon T. Jackson as Target Tech

== Production ==
=== Development ===
In 1994, 20th Century Fox and Erwin Stoff had produced the successful Keanu Reeves film Speed (1994). Stoff was at an office at the studio when he saw a poster for the 1951 film The Day the Earth Stood Still, which made him ponder a remake with Reeves as Klaatu. By the time David Scarpa started writing a draft of the script in 2005, Thomas Rothman was in charge of Fox and felt a responsibility to remake the film. Scarpa felt everything about the original film was still relevant, but changed the allegory from nuclear war to environmental damage because "the specifics of [how] we now have the capability to destroy ourselves have changed." Scarpa noted the recent events of Hurricane Katrina in 2005 informed his mindset when writing the screenplay. He scrapped Klaatu's speech at the conclusion of the story because "audiences today are [un]willing to tolerate that. People don't want to be preached to about the environment. We tried to avoid having our alien looking out over the garbage in the lake and crying a silent tear [from the 1970s Keep America Beautiful ads]."

Director Scott Derrickson admired the original film's director, Robert Wise, whom he met as a film student. He generally dislikes remakes, but he enjoyed the script, which he decided was a retelling of the story and not a true remake. He also explained that The Day the Earth Stood Still is not a widely seen classic film, unlike The Wizard of Oz (1939), which he would not bother remaking. Derrickson's benchmark was Philip Kaufman's 1978 remake of Invasion of the Body Snatchers (1956). Klaatu was made more menacing than in the original, because the director felt he had to symbolize the more complex era of the 2000s. There was debate over whether to have Klaatu land in Washington, D.C., as in the original; but Derrickson chose New York City because he liked the geometry of Klaatu's sphere landing in Central Park. Derrickson also did not write in Gort's original backstory, which was already absent from the script he read. He already thought the script was a good adaptation and didn't want the negative connotations of fascism from the original film.

Astronomer Seth Shostak served as scientific consultant on the film, reviewed the script several times for errors, gave suggestions for making the scientists appear less dry, and noted that they would refer to one another on a first-name basis. He said, "Real scientists don't describe an object entering the solar system as 'notable for the fact that it was not moving in an asteroidal ellipse, but moving at nearly three times ten to the seventh meters per second.' More likely, they would say that there was 'a goddamned rock headed our way!'"

=== Filming ===
Filming took place from December 12, 2007, to March 19, 2008, at Vancouver Film Studios, Vancouver Forum, Deer Lake, Jericho Park, and Simon Fraser University. The film was originally scheduled for release on May 9, 2008, but was delayed until December 12, 2008, because filming commenced later than scheduled. By the time preproduction started, Scarpa had written 40 drafts of the script. The film was mostly shot on sets, because it was winter in Vancouver.

Derrickson was fascinated by color schemes. He chose blue-green and orange as the primary colors for The Day the Earth Stood Still. The missile silo converted by the military for experimenting on Gort emphasized gray and orange, which was inspired by an image of lava flowing through a gray field. Derrickson opted to shoot on traditional film, and rendered the colors in post-production to make them more subtle, for realism.

To film Barnhardt and Klaatu writing equations on a blackboard, general relativity sums were drawn by Marco Peloso from the University of Minnesota and William Hiscock of Montana State University in faint pencil marks. Keanu Reeves and John Cleese drew over these in chalk.

As Fox had a mandate to become a carbon neutral company by 2011, The Day the Earth Stood Still's production had an environmentally friendly regimen. "Whether it was because of this movie thematically or it was an accident of time, there were certain things production-wise we've been doing and been asked to do and so on," said Erwin Stoff. To save paper, concept art, location stills and costume tests were posted on a website created by the production for crew members to reference. Costumes were kept for future Fox productions or given to homeless shelters rather than thrown away. Hybrid vehicles were used, and crew members had orders to turn off their car engines if they sat in their vehicles for more than three minutes.

=== Visual effects ===
The newly redesigned Gort and, behind him, the new biological spaceship resembling an orb

Weta Digital created the majority of the visual effects, with additional work by Cinesite and Flash Film Works. The machines of Klaatu's people have a biological basis rather than a mechanical one, as Derrickson theorized that their mastery of ecology would demonstrate their level of sophistication. Derrickson deemed a modern audience would find the original's flying saucer amusingly obsolete and unique to the original's milieu. The director also noted that the original The Day the Earth Stood Still had influenced many films, so his technicians needed to bring new ideas to the remake.

The visual effects team approached the new spacecraft's design as inter-dimensional portals resembling orbs. The script specified the inside of the orbs as a "white limbo-y thing", but visual effects consultant Jeff Okun explained this was considered too "cheesy". Derrickson felt not showing the inside of the ship, unlike the original, would make the audience more curious. As well as computer-generated spheres—such as Klaatu's 300-foot (91 m) ship, or a 3,000-foot-tall (910 m) orb that rises from the sea—700-pound (320 kg) spheres, 9 feet (2.7 m) in diameter, were sculpted by Custom Plastics, which built spheres for Disney theme parks. The spheres were split in two to make transportation easier. It was difficult placing lights inside them without making them melt. The visual-effects team looked at natural objects, including water droplets and the surfaces of Jupiter and Saturn for the spheres' texture.

Derrickson emphasized a Trinity-like relationship between the sphere, Klaatu, and Gort. Klaatu is initially depicted as a radiant focus of sentient light. He is then depicted as a 7-foot-tall (2.1 m) gray "walking womb" shape which finally takes on a completely human appearance. The filmmakers conceived the transitional form, because they pondered the idea of humans mistaking space suits for alien skin. Computer-generated imagery and practical effects achieved the transformation. Todd Masters (Slither) directed the creation of the alien form, using thermal plastic and silicone.

The script described Gort as nanotechnology by the time the director signed on, although it did not specify Gort's appearance. The 15th draft of the script had depicted the robot as a four-legged "Totem" that stands upright after firing its weapon beam. Okun explained there were many more "horrific" or "amazing" concepts, but it made sense that the robot would assume a familiar human shape. He cited the Monolith from the 1968 film 2001: A Space Odyssey as an inspiration for Gort's texture, noting "it's a simple shape, it has no emotion [...] it just simply is", which makes Gort more frightening because the audience cannot tell what he is thinking. The animators estimated the computer-generated robot as 28 feet (8.5 m) tall, whereas in the original he was played by 7-foot-7-inch-tall (2.31 m) Lock Martin. Gort's computer model was programmed to reflect light, and the filmmakers spent time on motion-capture sessions to guide the performance. An actor wore weights on his hands and feet, allowing the animators to bring a sense of weight and power to Gort. His destructive capabilities were based on locust swarms, although the idea of metal-eating insects goes back to Stephen Vincent Benét's 1933 poem "Metropolitan Nightmare".

== Music ==
The Day the Earth Stood Still: Original Motion Picture Soundtrack

Soundtrack album by Tyler Bates
- Released: December 16, 2008
- Length: 52:43
- Label: Varèse Sarabande

The Day the Earth Stood Still: Original Motion Picture Soundtrack was conducted and orchestrated by Timothy Williams. Tyler Bates was brought in to compose the score after Derrickson heard his work on The Devil's Rejects (2005) and Slither (2006). Instead of imitating the original score by Bernard Herrmann, Bates decided to try to convey the new film's updated message, assuming that many people would not even realize it was a remake. Bates said, "People revere an original property and feel that it's sacred, but frankly, there's a good story to be retold, as it applies to the climate of the world now. If that's something beyond the scope of a person's ability to take in, on a new level, without necessarily using the original as a criterion for whether or not they're going to enjoy it, then they probably shouldn't bother themselves with it." The origins for the sound on the new score came from Bates attending the filming of a few scenes with Reeves and Smith. When he returned to Los Angeles, he created a sound loop on his GuitarViol to which Derrickson responded, "I think that's the score!", when it was played for him. Bates utilized the theremin, which Herrmann used heavily in the original film's score. Bates and the theremin player he hired used the instrument primarily as sound effect, especially during Klaatu's surgery. A short segment from Bach's Goldberg Variations, not included in the film's soundtrack release, is also heard in the background of the Professor's home when Klaatu visits him.

== Release ==
On the film's December 12, 2008 release, the Deep Space Communications Network at Cape Canaveral was to transmit the film to Alpha Centauri.

=== Home media ===
The Day the Earth Stood Still was released by 20th Century Fox Home Entertainment on DVD and Blu-ray on April 7, 2009, almost four months after its release and only five days after its theater run ended. Bonus features include commentary with Scarpa along with a picture-in-picture showing the visual effects footage, concept art, and photos. It also includes several featurettes: "Build Your Own Gort", "Re-Imagining The Day", "Unleashing Gort", "Watching the Skies: In Search of Extraterrestrial Life", and "The Day the Earth was Green." Also included were three still galleries and the film's trailer. Packaged with the film on a separate disc, is the original 1951 film. The Blu-ray release features a D-BOX motion code.

According to data by Home Media Magazine, it came in first for rentals during its first and second weeks. For the first week of its release it was ranked first in Blu-ray sales, and second on the regular DVD sales chart, behind Bedtime Stories, totaling $14,650,377 (not including Blu-ray).

== Reception ==
=== Box office ===
The Day the Earth Stood Still opened in North America on December 12, 2008. During that opening weekend, and despite mostly negative response from critics, it reached the #1 spot, grossing $30,480,153 from 3,560 theaters with an $8,562 average per theater. Out of its opening weekend income, 12% was from IMAX; it was "the highest IMAX share yet for a two-dimensional title". In 2008, it was the 27th-highest-grossing film during its opening weekend but 40th for the entire year. It stayed in the top 10 for its first four weeks in theaters, and ended up grossing $79,366,978 domestically and $153,726,881 in foreign markets, a total of $233,093,859.

=== Critical response ===
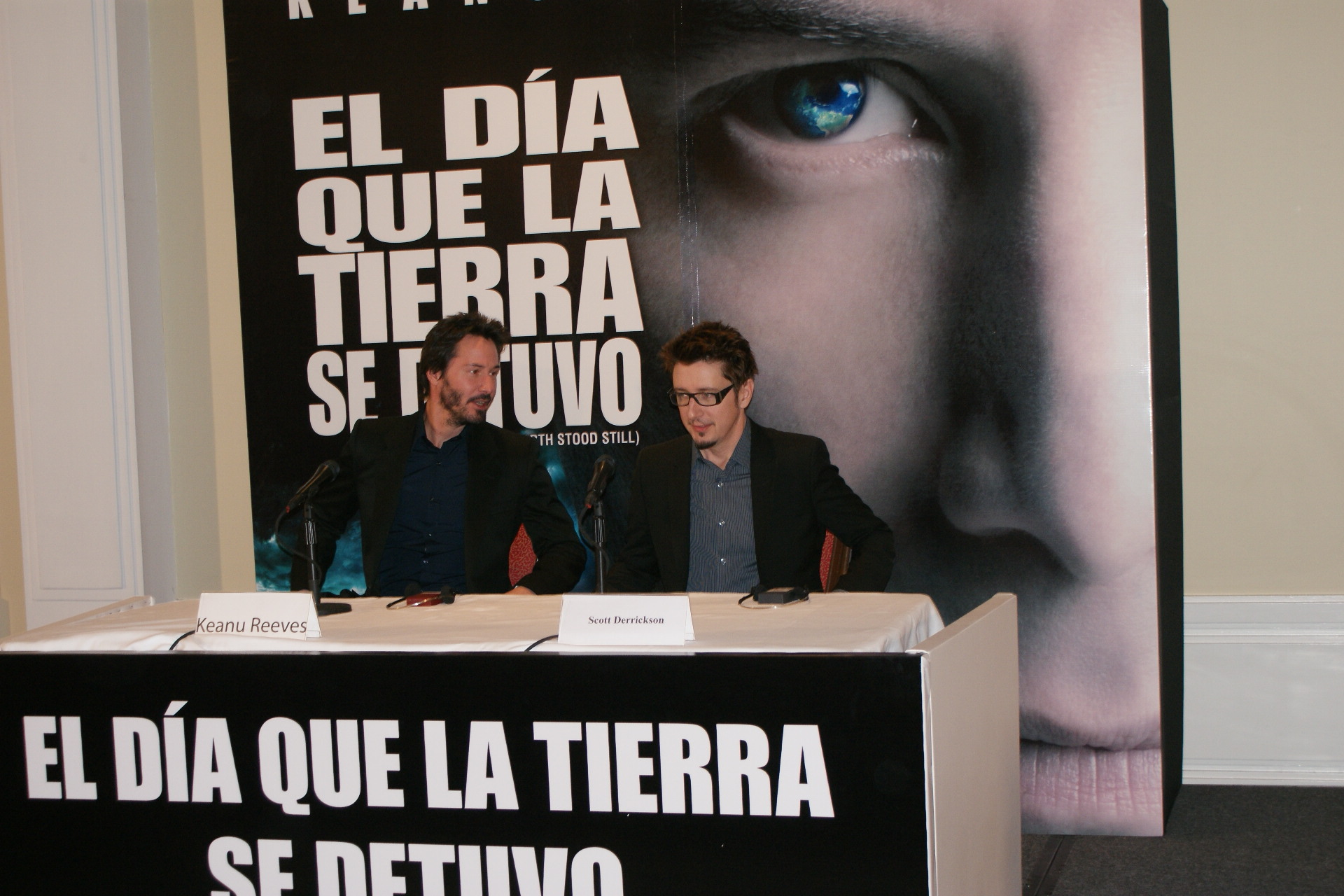
Keanu Reeves and Scott Derrickson promoting the film in Mexico. December 12, 2008.

Based on 194 reviews collected by Rotten Tomatoes, only 21% of them were positive, with an average rating of 4.4/10. The website's critics consensus reads: "Heavy on special effects, but without a coherent story at its base, The Day the Earth Stood Still is subpar re-imagining of the 1951 science-fiction classic". On Metacritic, the film has a score of 40 out of 100 based on reviews from 34 critics, indicating "mixed or average reviews". Audiences polled by CinemaScore gave the film an average grade of "C−" on an A+ to F scale.

Bruce Paterson of the Australian Film Critics Association gave the film 3 out of 5 stars, writing that the generally poor reception for the film was "a sad fate for a surprisingly sincere tribute to Robert Wise's 1951 classic". Kenneth Turan of the Los Angeles Times "congratulated" Keanu Reeves's performance and wrote in his review, "This contemporary remake of the science-fiction classic knew what it was doing when it cast Keanu Reeves, the movies' greatest stone face since Buster Keaton."

A. O. Scott of The New York Times was not impressed with Reeves's performance, commenting, "Even Klaatu looks bored and distracted, much as he did back when we knew him as Neo." William Arnold of the Seattle Post-Intelligencer gave the film a B minus and wrote, "It's a decent enough stab at being what the old movie was to its time, following the same basic plot, full of respectful references to its model, updated with a gallery of fairly imaginative special effects." Roger Ebert of the Chicago Sun-Times gave the film two stars and noted that the film had "taken its title so seriously that the plot stands still along with it", but also stated that it was "an expensive, good-looking film that is well-made by Scott Derrickson".

=== Accolades ===
Before its release, The Day the Earth Stood Still was nominated at the 13th Satellite Awards for the Satellite Awards for Best Visual Effects and Best Sound.

At the 2009 Razzie Awards, the film was nominated for Worst Prequel, Remake, Rip-off or Sequel, but lost the award to Indiana Jones and the Kingdom of the Crystal Skull.

The film was nominated for the 2008 VES Award for Best Single Visual Effect of the Year, losing to The Curious Case of Benjamin Button. The film was also nominated for Best Science Fiction Film at the Saturn Awards and Jaden Smith won Best Performance by a Younger Actor.

== See also ==
- The Day the Earth Stopped: A mockbuster released the same year.
