= The Day the Earth Stood Still (soundtrack) =

Film score by Bernard Herrmann
- Released: 1993
- Recorded: August 1951
- Genre: Soundtracks, Film score
- Length: 63:41
- Label: 20th Century Fox Film Scores
- Producer: Nick Redman

Professional ratings
Review scores
Source	Rating
AllMusic	4.5/5 stars

The Day the Earth Stood Still soundtrack (1951) was composed in July, and recorded in August 1951. It was Bernard Herrmann's first soundtrack after he moved from New York to Hollywood. Herrmann chose unusual instrumentation for the film including violin, cello, and bass (all three electric), two theremin electronic instruments (played by Samuel Hoffman and Paul Shure), two Hammond organs, a large studio electric organ, three vibraphones, two glockenspiels, two pianos, two harps, three trumpets, three trombones, four tubas, and extensive percussion including cymbals and tam-tam. Unusual overdubbing and tape-reversal techniques were used, as well. 20th Century Fox later reused the Herrmann title theme in the original pilot episode for Irwin Allen's 1965 TV series Lost in Space. Danny Elfman noted The Day the Earth Stood Still's score inspired his interest in film composing, and made him a fan of Herrmann.

Track listing
No.	Title	Length
1.	"Twentieth Century Fox Fanfare"	0:12
2.	"Prelude / Outer Space/Radar"	3:45
3.	"Danger"	0:24
4.	"Klaatu"	2:15
5.	"Gort / The Visor / The Telescope"	2:23
6.	"Escape"	0:55
7.	"Solar Diamonds" (not used in film)	1:04
8.	"Arlington"	1:08
9.	"Lincoln Memorial"	1:27
10.	"Nocturne / The Flashlight / The Robot / Space Control"	5:58
11.	"The Elevator / Magnetic Pull / The Study / The Conference / The Jewelry Store"	4:32
12.	"Panic"	0:42
13.	"The Glowing / Alone / Gort's Rage / Nikto / The Captive / Terror"	5:11
14.	"The Prison"	1:42
15.	"Rebirth"	1:38
16.	"Departure"	0:52
17.	"Farewell"	0:32
18.	"Finale"	0:30

== Remake soundtrack ==
Day the Earth Stood Still

Film score by Tyler Bates
- Released: December 16, 2008
- Length: 52:43
- Label: Varèse Sarabande; Fox Music

Tyler Bates was brought in to compose the score for 2008 remake of The Day the Earth Stood Still after Derrickson heard his work on The Devil's Rejects and Slither. Bates decided that instead of imitating the original score by Bernard Herrmann he would try and convey the message of the new film, which was different, and assumed that most people would not even realize it was a remake. He said:

People revere an original property and feel that it's sacred, but frankly, there's a good story to be retold, as it applies to the climate of the world now. If that's something beyond the scope of a person's ability to take in, on a new level, without necessarily using the original as a criterion for whether or not they're going to enjoy it, then they probably shouldn't bother themselves with it.

The origins for the sound on the new score came from Bates attending the filming of a few scenes with Reeves and Smith. When he got back to Los Angeles he created a loop on his GuitarViol to which Derrickson responded "I think that’s the score!" when it was played for him. Taking just a piece of the original score, Bates utilized the theremin, which Herrmann heavily used for the original film. Bates and the theremin player he hired used the instrument in a manner reminiscent of a sound effect, especially during Klaatu's surgery.

Track listing
No.	Title	Length
1.	"Stars"	0:39
2.	"Mountain Climber"	2:41
3.	"National Security"	2:47
4.	"This Is Not an Exercise"	0:52
5.	"Do You Feel That?"	2:00
6.	"Military Approach"	1:07
7.	"G.O.R.T"	2:42
8.	"Surgery"	1:30
9.	"Interrogation"	2:33
10.	"You Should Let Me Go"	2:24
11.	"A Friend to the Earth"	1:55
12.	"Fighter Drones"	1:23
13.	"Came to Save the Earth"	0:45
14.	"I'm Staying"	1:10
15.	"Helen Drives"	0:44
16.	"Containing G.O.R.T"	0:44
17.	"The Day the Earth Stood Still"	2:41
18.	"They're Not Afraid of Us"	1:20
19.	"Flash Chamber"	0:54
20.	"Helicopter Collision"	5:14
21.	"See My Son"	2:11
22.	"Cemetery"	3:19
23.	"Distress"	1:59
24.	"Wrong Place Wrong Time"	0:55
25.	"Aphid Reign"	4:17
26.	"Power Down"	0:56
27.	"He's Leaving"	1:50
28.	"The Beginning"	1:11
