= Fantastic Films =

- Fantastic Films issue 1
- Editor: Irving Karchmar
- Art director: Mike Stein
- Categories: Science Fiction, Fantasy
- Frequency: Varied per year
- Founded: 1978
- Final issue: 1985
- Company: Blake Publishing Corp.
- Country: United States
- Language: English
- ISSN: 0273-7043

Fantastic Films was an American film magazine specializing in the genres of science fiction and fantasy. The magazine was published by Blake Publishing Corp. and existed between 1978 and 1985.

== Direction ==
Fantastic Films was intended as an alternative to competitors such as Cinefantastique and Starlog. The magazine set itself apart by featuring extensive interviews with actors and behind-the-scenes personnel. The magazine never featured editorials or reviews but did have a rather lengthy Reaction section that allowed readers to send in their letters. In addition, the magazine featured a Fantastic Films Archive Series, a retrospective section that highlighted classic sci-fi films of the past ranging from popular titles like The Day the Earth Stood Still to more obscure fare like Just Imagine.
