= Edmund H. North =

American screenwriter (1911–1990)

Edmund Hall North (March 12, 1911 – August 28, 1990) was an American screenwriter who shared an Oscar for Best Original Screenplay with Francis Ford Coppola in 1970 for their script for Patton.

North wrote the screenplay for the 1951 science-fiction classic The Day the Earth Stood Still and is credited with creating the famous line from the film, "Klaatu barada nikto".

He was a son of Bobby North and Stella Maury who performed in vaudeville and the Ziegfeld Follies. North began writing plays while attending Culver Military Academy in Indiana and at Stanford University. As a major in the U.S. Army Signal Corps during World War II, he made training and educational films.

North was a president of the screen branch of the Writers Guild of America in which he served on more than 40 committees, including the contract-bargaining panel.

North and his wife, Collette had two daughters. He lived in Brentwood, Los Angeles, and was 79 when he died.

== Credits (alone or in collaboration) ==
- One Night of Love (1934)
- Bunker Bean (1936)
- I'm Still Alive (1940)
- Dishonored Lady (1947)
- Colorado Territory (1949)
- Flamingo Road (1949)
- Young Man With a Horn (1950)
- Only the Valiant (1950)
- The Day the Earth Stood Still (1951)
- The Outcasts of Poker Flat (1952)
- Destry (1954)
- The Far Horizons (1955)
- The Proud Ones (1956)
- The Lady Takes a Flyer (1958) (screenstory only, basis for the screenplay by Danny Arnold)
- Cowboy (1958) (fronted for Dalton Trumbo)
- Sink the Bismarck! (1960)
- Damn the Defiant (1962) aka H.M.S. Defiant
- Patton (1970)
- Meteor (1979)
- The Day the Earth Stood Still (2008) (screenplay credit)
