= Science fiction film =

Film genre

Metropolis (1927) by Fritz Lang was one of the first feature-length science fiction films. It was produced at Studio Babelsberg, Germany. (Image shows a scene from the film)

Science fiction film refers to the application of science fiction themes into a film genre. As such, it uses speculative, science-based depictions of phenomena that are not fully accepted by mainstream science, such as extraterrestrial lifeforms, spacecraft, robots, cyborgs, mutants, interstellar travel, time travel, or other technologies. Science fiction films have often been used to focus on political or social issues, and to explore philosophical issues like the human condition.

The genre has existed since the early years of silent cinema, when Georges Méliès' A Trip to the Moon (1902) employed trick photography effects. The next major example (one of the first feature-length in the genre) was the film Metropolis (1927). There were a few early big-budget films, notably Things to Come (1936), but from the 1930s to the 1950s the genre consisted mainly of low-budget B movies. After Stanley Kubrick's landmark 2001: A Space Odyssey (1968), the science fiction film genre was taken more seriously. In the late 1970s, big-budget science fiction films filled with special effects became popular with audiences after the success of Star Wars (1977) and paved the way for the blockbuster hits of subsequent decades.

Screenwriter and scholar Eric R. Williams identifies science fiction films as one of eleven super-genres in his screenwriters’ taxonomy, stating that all feature-length narrative films can be classified by these super-genres. The other ten super-genres are action, crime, fantasy, horror, romance, slice of life, sports, thriller, war, and western.

== Characteristics of the genre ==
According to Vivian Sobchack, a British cinema and media theorist and cultural critic:

Science fiction film is a film genre which emphasizes actual, extrapolative, or 2.0 speculative science and the empirical method, interacting in a social context with the lesser emphasized, but still present, transcendentalism of magic and religion, in an attempt to reconcile man with the unknown.

— Vivian Carol Sobchack, p. 63

This definition suggests a continuum between (real-world) empiricism and (supernatural) transcendentalism, with science fiction films on the side of empiricism, and happy films and sad films on the side of transcendentalism. However, there are numerous well-known examples of science fiction horror films, epitomized by such pictures as Frankenstein and Alien.

The visual style of science fiction film is characterized by a clash between alien and familiar images. This clash is implemented when alien images become familiar, as in A Clockwork Orange, when the repetitions of the Korova Milkbar make the alien decor seem more familiar. As well, familiar images become alien, as in the films Repo Man and Liquid Sky. For example, in Dr. Strangelove, the distortion of the humans make the familiar images seem more alien. Finally, alien images are juxtaposed with the familiar, as in The Deadly Mantis, when a giant praying mantis is shown climbing the Washington Monument.

Cultural theorist Scott Bukatman has proposed that science fiction film allows contemporary culture to witness an expression of the sublime, be it through exaggerated scale, apocalypse or transcendence.

== History ==
=== 1900–1920s ===
The Mechanical Man (1921)

Science fiction films appeared early in the silent film era, typically as short films shot in black and white, sometimes with colour tinting. They usually had a technological theme and were often intended to be humorous. In Things to Come: An Illustrated History of the Science Fiction Film, Douglas Menville and R. Reginald judged Gugusse and the Automaton to be the most significant scientifically themed film of 1897, and suggested that it “may be the first true SF [science fiction] film.” However, Georges Méliès’s Le Voyage dans la Lune, released in 1902, is generally considered the first science fiction film; it is a film that uses early trick photography to depict a spacecraft's journey to the Moon. Several early films merged the science fiction and horror genres. Examples of this are Frankenstein (1910), a film adaptation of Mary Shelley's novel, and Dr. Jekyll and Mr. Hyde (1920), based on the psychological tale by Robert Louis Stevenson. Taking a more adventurous tack, 20,000 Leagues Under the Sea (1916) is a film based on Jules Verne’s famous novel of a wondrous submarine and its vengeful captain. In the 1920s, European filmmakers tended to use science fiction for prediction and social commentary, as can be seen in German films such as Metropolis (1927) and Frau im Mond (1929). Other notable science fiction films of the silent era include The Impossible Voyage (1904), The '?' Motorist (1906), The Conquest of the Pole (1912), Himmelskibet (1918; which with its runtime of 97 minutes generally is considered the first feature-length science fiction film in history), The Cabinet of Dr. Caligari (1920), The Mechanical Man (1921), Paris Qui Dort (1923), Aelita (1924), Luch Smerti (1925), and The Lost World (1925).

=== 1930s–1950s ===
In the 1930s, there were several big budget science fiction films, notably Just Imagine (1930), King Kong (1933) and Things to Come (1936). Starting in 1936, a number of science fiction comic strips were adapted as serials, notably Flash Gordon and Buck Rogers, both starring Buster Crabbe. These serials, and the comic strips they were based on, were very popular with the general public. Other notable science fiction films of the 1930s include Frankenstein (1931), Bride of Frankenstein (1935), Doctor X (1932), Dr. Jekyll and Mr. Hyde (1931), F.P.1 (1932), Island of Lost Souls (1932), Deluge (1933), The Invisible Man (1933), Master of the World (1934), Mad Love (1935), Trans-Atlantic Tunnel (1935), The Devil-Doll (1936), The Invisible Ray (1936), The Man Who Changed His Mind (1936), The Walking Dead (1936), Non-Stop New York (1937), and The Return of Doctor X (1939). The 1940s brought us Before I Hang (1940), Black Friday (1940), Dr. Cyclops (1940), The Devil Commands (1941), Dr. Jekyll and Mr. Hyde (1941), Man Made Monster (1941), It Happened Tomorrow (1944), It Happens Every Spring (1949), and The Perfect Woman (1949). The release of Destination Moon (1950) and Rocketship X-M (1950) brought us to what many people consider "the golden age of the science fiction film".

In the 1950s, public interest in space travel and new technologies was great. While many 1950s science fiction films were low-budget B movies, there were several successful films with larger budgets and impressive special effects. These include The Day the Earth Stood Still (1951), The Thing from Another World (1951), When Worlds Collide (1951), The War of the Worlds (1953), 20,000 Leagues Under the Sea (1954), This Island Earth (1955), Forbidden Planet (1956), Invasion of the Body Snatchers (1956), The Curse of Frankenstein (1957), Journey to the Center of the Earth (1959) and On the Beach (1959). There is often a close connection between films in the science fiction genre and the so-called "monster movie". Examples of this are Them! (1954), The Beast from 20,000 Fathoms (1953) and The Blob (1958). During the 1950s, Ray Harryhausen, protege of master King Kong animator Willis O'Brien, used stop-motion animation to create special effects for the following notable science fiction films: It Came from Beneath the Sea (1955), Earth vs. the Flying Saucers (1956) and 20 Million Miles to Earth (1957).

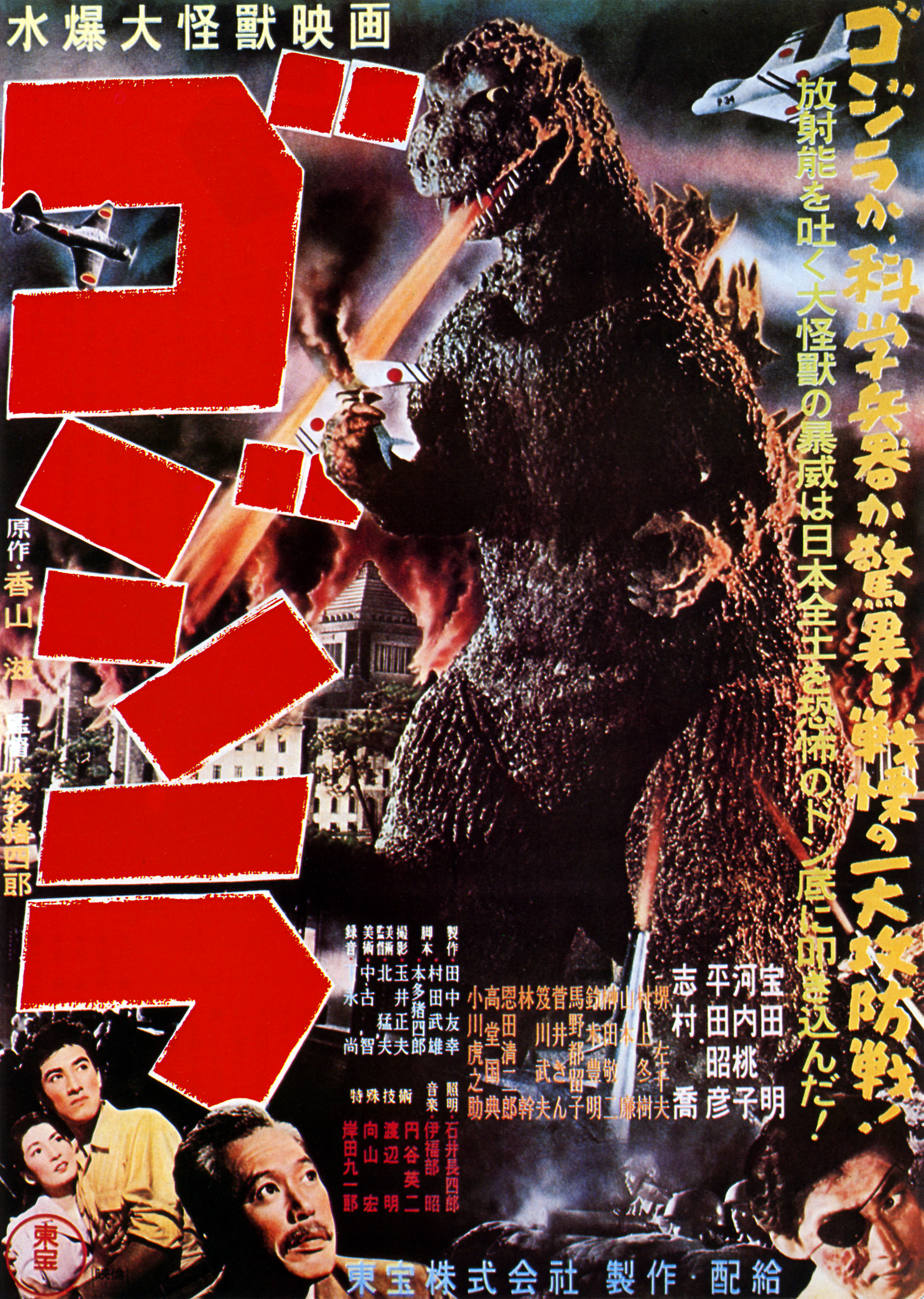
Poster for the 1954 Japanese monster film Godzilla

The most successful monster movies were Japanese film studio Toho's kaiju films directed by Ishirō Honda and featuring special effects by Eiji Tsuburaya. The 1954 film Godzilla, with the title monster attacking Tokyo, gained immense popularity, spawned multiple sequels, led to other kaiju films like Rodan, and created one of the most recognizable monsters in cinema history. Japanese science fiction films, particularly the tokusatsu and kaiju genres, were known for their extensive use of special effects, and gained worldwide popularity in the 1950s. Kaiju and tokusatsu films, notably Warning from Space (1956), sparked Stanley Kubrick's interest in science fiction films and influenced 2001: A Space Odyssey (1968). According to his biographer John Baxter, despite their "clumsy model sequences, the films were often well-photographed in colour ... and their dismal dialogue was delivered in well-designed and well-lit sets."

=== 1960s–present ===
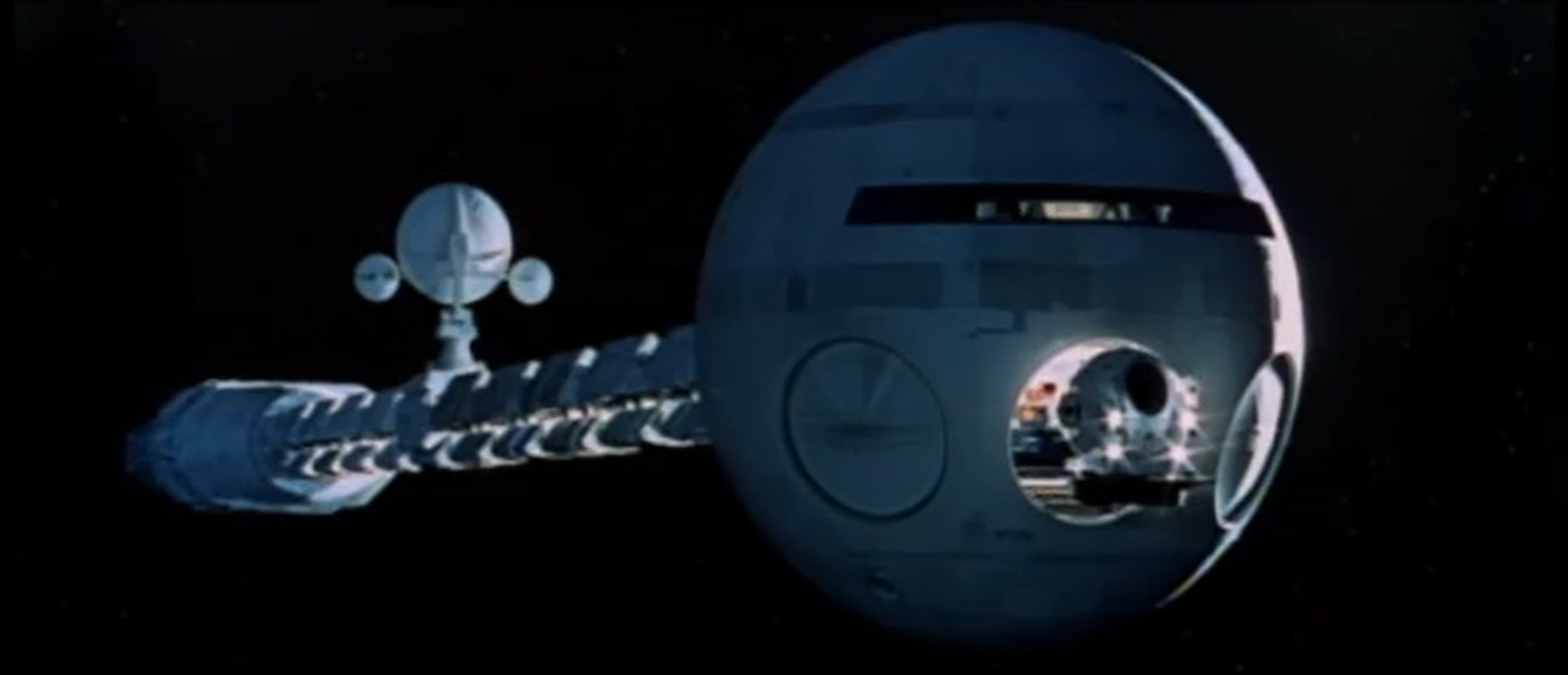
2001: A Space Odyssey, the landmark 1968 collaboration between filmmaker Stanley Kubrick and classic science-fiction author Arthur C. Clarke, featured groundbreaking special effects, such as the realization of the spaceship USSC Discovery One (pictured here).

With the Space Race between the USSR and the US going on, documentaries and illustrations of actual events, pioneers and technology were plenty. Any movie featuring realistic space travel was at risk of being obsolete at its time of release, rather fossil than fiction. There were relatively few science fiction films in the 1960s, but some of the films transformed science fiction cinema. Stanley Kubrick's 2001: A Space Odyssey (1968) brought new realism to the genre, with its groundbreaking visual effects and realistic portrayal of space travel and influenced the genre with its epic story and transcendent philosophical scope. Other 1960s films included Planet of the Vampires (1965) by Italian filmmaker Mario Bava, that is regarded as one of the best movies of the period, Planet of the Apes (1968) and Fahrenheit 451 (1966), which provided social commentary, and the campy Barbarella (1968), which explored the comical side of earlier science fiction. Jean-Luc Godard's French "new wave" film Alphaville (1965) posited a futuristic Paris commanded by an artificial intelligence which has outlawed all emotion.

The era of crewed trips to the Moon in 1969 and the 1970s saw a resurgence of interest in the science fiction film. Andrei Tarkovsky's Solaris (1972) and Stalker (1979) are two widely acclaimed examples of the renewed interest of film auteurs in science fiction. Science fiction films from the early 1970s explored the theme of paranoia, in which humanity is depicted as under threat from sociological, ecological or technological adversaries of its own creation, such as George Lucas's directional debut THX 1138 (1971), The Andromeda Strain (1971), Silent Running (1972), Soylent Green (1973), Westworld (1973) and its sequel Futureworld (1976), and Logan's Run (1976). The science fiction comedies of the 1970s included Woody Allen's Sleeper (1973), and John Carpenter's Dark Star (1974). The sports science fiction genre can be seen in films such as Rollerball (1975).

Star Wars (1977) and Close Encounters of the Third Kind (1977) were box-office hits that brought about a huge increase in science fiction films. In 1979, Star Trek: The Motion Picture brought the television series to the big screen for the first time. It was also in this period that the Walt Disney Company released many science fiction films for family audiences such as The Black Hole, Flight of the Navigator, and Honey, I Shrunk the Kids. The sequels to Star Wars, The Empire Strikes Back (1980) and Return of the Jedi (1983), also saw worldwide box office success. Ridley Scott's films, such as Alien (1979) and Blade Runner (1982), along with James Cameron's The Terminator (1984), presented the future as dark, dirty and chaotic, and depicted aliens and androids as hostile and dangerous. In contrast, Steven Spielberg's E.T. the Extra-Terrestrial (1982), one of the most successful films of the 1980s, presented aliens as benign and friendly, a theme already present in Spielberg's own Close Encounters of the Third Kind. James Bond also entered the science fiction genre in 1979 with Moonraker.

The big budget adaptations of Frank Herbert's Dune and Alex Raymond's Flash Gordon, as well as Peter Hyams's sequel to 2001, 2010: The Year We Make Contact (based on 2001 author Arthur C. Clarke's sequel novel 2010: Odyssey Two), were box office failures that dissuaded producers from investing in science fiction literary properties. Disney's Tron (1982) turned out to be a moderate success. The strongest contributors to the genre during the second half of the 1980s were James Cameron and Paul Verhoeven with The Terminator and RoboCop entries. Robert Zemeckis' film Back to the Future (1985) and its sequels were critically praised and became box office successes, not to mention international phenomena. James Cameron's sequel to Alien, Aliens (1986), was very different from the original film, falling more into the action/science fiction genre, it was both a critical and commercial success and Sigourney Weaver was nominated for Best Actress in a Leading Role at the Academy Awards. The Japanese cyberpunk anime film Akira (1988) also had a big influence outside Japan when released.

In the 1990s, the emergence of the World Wide Web and the cyberpunk genre spawned several movies on the theme of the computer-human interface, such as Terminator 2: Judgment Day (1991), Total Recall (1990), The Lawnmower Man (1992), and The Matrix (1999). Other themes included disaster films (e.g., Armageddon and Deep Impact, both 1998), alien invasion (e.g., Independence Day (1996)) and genetic experimentation (e.g., Jurassic Park (1993) and Gattaca (1997)). Also, the Star Wars prequel trilogy began with the release of Star Wars: Episode I – The Phantom Menace, which eventually grossed over one billion dollars.

As the decade progressed, computers played an increasingly important role in both the addition of special effects (thanks to Terminator 2: Judgment Day and Jurassic Park) and the production of films. As software developed in sophistication it was used to produce more complicated effects. It also enabled filmmakers to enhance the visual quality of animation, resulting in films such as Ghost in the Shell (1995) from Japan, and The Iron Giant (1999) from the United States.

During the first decade of the 2000s, superhero films abounded, as did earthbound science fiction such as the Matrix trilogy. In 2005, the Star Wars saga was completed (although it was later continued, but at the time it was not intended to be) with the darkly themed Star Wars: Episode III – Revenge of the Sith. Science-fiction also returned as a tool for political commentary in films such as A.I. Artificial Intelligence, Minority Report, Sunshine, District 9, Children of Men, Serenity, Sleep Dealer, and Pandorum. The 2000s also saw the release of Transformers (2007) and Transformers: Revenge of the Fallen (2009), both of which resulted in worldwide box office success. In 2009, James Cameron's Avatar garnered worldwide box office success, and would later become the highest-grossing movie of all time. This movie was also an example of political commentary. It depicted humans destroying the environment on another planet by mining for a special metal called unobtainium. That same year, Terminator Salvation was released and garnered only moderate success.

The 2010s saw new entries in several classic science fiction franchises, including Predators (2010), Tron: Legacy (2010), a resurgence of the Star Wars series, and entries into the Planet of the Apes and Godzilla franchises. Several more cross-genre films have also been produced, including comedies such as Hot Tub Time Machine (2010), Seeking a Friend for the End of the World (2012), Safety Not Guaranteed (2013), and Pixels (2015), romance films such as Her (2013), Monsters (2010), and Ex Machina (2015), heist films including Inception (2010) and action films including Real Steel (2011), Total Recall (2012), Edge of Tomorrow (2014), Pacific Rim (2013), Chappie (2015), Tomorrowland (2015), and Ghost in the Shell (2017). The superhero film boom has also continued, into films such as Iron Man 2 (2010) and Iron Man 3 (2013), several entries into the X-Men film series, and The Avengers (2012), which became the fourth-highest-grossing film of all time. New franchises such as Deadpool and Guardians of the Galaxy also began in this decade.

Further into the decade, more realistic science fiction epic films also become prevalent, including Battleship (2012), Gravity (2013), Elysium (2013), Interstellar (2014), Mad Max: Fury Road (2015), The Martian (2015), Arrival (2016), Passengers (2016), and Blade Runner 2049 (2017). Many of these films have gained widespread accolades, including several Academy Award wins and nominations. These films have addressed recent matters of scientific interest, including space travel, climate change, and artificial intelligence.

Alongside these original films, many adaptations were produced, especially within the young adult dystopian fiction subgenre, popular in the early part of the decade. These include the Hunger Games film series, based on the trilogy of novels by Suzanne Collins, The Divergent Series based on Veronica Roth's Divergent trilogy, and the Maze Runner series, based on James Dashner's The Maze Runner novels. Several adult adaptations have also been produced, including The Martian (2015), based on Andy Weir's 2011 novel, Cloud Atlas (2012), based on David Mitchell's 2004 novel, World War Z, based on Max Brooks' 2006 novel, and Ready Player One (2018), based on Ernest Cline's 2011 novel.

Independent productions also increased in the 2010s, with the rise of digital filmmaking making it easier for filmmakers to produce movies on a smaller budget. These films include Attack the Block (2011), Source Code (2011), Looper (2012), Upstream Color (2013), Ex Machina (2015), and Valerian and the City of a Thousand Planets (2017). In 2016, Ex Machina won the Academy Award for Visual Effects in a surprising upset over the much higher-budget Star Wars: The Force Awakens (2015).

== Themes, imagery, and visual elements ==
Science fiction films are often speculative in nature, and often include key supporting elements of science and technology. However, as often as not the "science" in a Hollywood science fiction movie can be considered pseudo-science, relying primarily on atmosphere and quasi-scientific artistic fancy than facts and conventional scientific theory. The definition can also vary depending on the viewpoint of the observer.

Many science fiction films include elements of mysticism, occult, magic, or the supernatural, considered by some to be more properly elements of fantasy or the occult (or religious) film. This transforms the movie genre into a science fantasy with a religious or quasi-religious philosophy serving as the driving motivation. The movie Forbidden Planet employs many common science fiction elements, but the film carries a profound message - that the evolution of a species toward technological perfection (in this case exemplified by the disappeared alien civilization called the "Krell") does not ensure the loss of primitive and dangerous urges. In the film, this part of the primitive mind manifests itself as monstrous destructive force emanating from the Freudian subconscious, or "Id".

Some films blur the line between the genres, such as films where the protagonist gains the extraordinary powers of the superhero. These films usually employ quasi-plausible reason for the hero gaining these powers.

Not all science fiction themes are equally suitable for movies. Science fiction horror is most common. Often enough, these films could just as well pass as Westerns or World War II films if the science fiction props were removed. Common motifs also include voyages and expeditions to other planets, and dystopias, while utopias are rare.

=== Imagery ===
Film theorist Vivian Sobchack argues that science fiction films differ from fantasy films in that while science fiction film seeks to achieve our belief in the images we are viewing, fantasy film instead attempts to suspend our disbelief. The science fiction film displays the unfamiliar and alien in the context of the familiar. Despite the alien nature of the scenes and science fictional elements of the setting, the imagery of the film is related back to humankind and how we relate to our surroundings. While the science fiction film strives to push the boundaries of the human experience, they remain bound to the conditions and understanding of the audience and thereby contain prosaic aspects, rather than being completely alien or abstract.

Genre films such as westerns or war movies are bound to a particular area or time period. This is not true of the science fiction film. However, there are several common visual elements that are evocative of the genre. These include the spacecraft or space station, alien worlds or creatures, robots, and futuristic gadgets. Examples include movies like Lost in Space, Serenity, Avatar, Prometheus, Tomorrowland, Passengers, and Valerian and the City of a Thousand Planets. More subtle visual clues can appear with changes of the human form through modifications in appearance, size, or behavior, or by means a known environment turned eerily alien, such as an empty city The Omega Man (1971).

=== Scientific elements ===
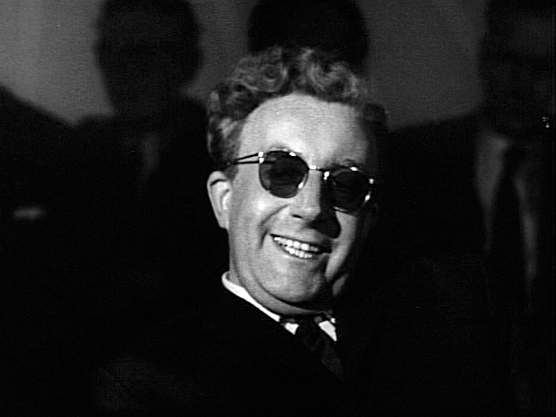
Peter Sellers as the titular character from Dr. Strangelove (1964)

While science is a major element of this genre, many movie studios take significant liberties with scientific knowledge. Such liberties can be most readily observed in films that show spacecraft maneuvering in outer space. The vacuum should preclude the transmission of sound or maneuvers employing wings, yet the soundtrack is filled with inappropriate flying noises and changes in flight path resembling an aircraft banking. The filmmakers, unfamiliar with the specifics of space travel, focus instead on providing acoustical atmosphere and the more familiar maneuvers of the aircraft.

Similar instances of ignoring science in favor of art can be seen when movies present environmental effects as portrayed in Star Wars and Star Trek. Entire planets are destroyed in titanic explosions requiring mere seconds, whereas an actual event of this nature takes many hours.

The role of the scientist has varied considerably in the science fiction film genre, depending on the public perception of science and advanced technology. Starting with Dr. Frankenstein, the mad scientist became a stock character who posed a dire threat to society and perhaps even civilization. Certain portrayals of the "mad scientist", such as Peter Sellers's performance in Dr. Strangelove, have become iconic to the genre. In the monster films of the 1950s, the scientist often played a heroic role as the only person who could provide a technological fix for some impending doom. Reflecting the distrust of government that began in the 1960s in the United States, the brilliant but rebellious scientist became a common theme, often serving a Cassandra-like role during an impending disaster.

Biotechnology (e.g., cloning) is a popular scientific element in films as depicted in Jurassic Park (cloning of extinct species), The Island (cloning of humans), and (genetic modification) in some superhero movies and in the Alien series. Cybernetics and holographic projections as depicted in RoboCop and I, Robot are also popularized. Interstellar travel and teleportation is a popular theme in the Star Trek series that is achieved through warp drives and transporters while intergalactic travel is popular in films such as Stargate and Star Wars that is achieved through hyperspace or wormholes. Nanotechnology is also featured in the Star Trek series in the form of replicators (utopia), in The Day the Earth Stood Still in the form of grey goo (dystopia), and in Iron Man 3 in the form of extremis (nanotubes). Force fields is a popular theme in Independence Day while invisibility is also popular in Star Trek. Arc reactor technology, featured in Iron Man, is similar to a cold fusion device. Miniaturization technology where people are shrunk to microscopic sizes is featured in films like Fantastic Voyage (1966), Honey, I Shrunk the Kids (1989), and Marvel's Ant-Man (2015).

The late Arthur C. Clarke's third law states that "any sufficiently advanced technology is indistinguishable from magic". Past science fiction films have depicted "fictional" ("magical") technologies that became present reality. For example, the Personal Access Display Device from Star Trek was a precursor of smartphones and tablet computers. Gesture recognition in the movie Minority Report is part of current game consoles. Human-level artificial intelligence is also fast approaching with the advent of smartphone A.I. while a working cloaking device / material is the main goal of stealth technology. Autonomous cars (e.g. KITT from the Knight Rider series) and quantum computers, like in the movie Stealth and Transcendence, also will be available eventually. Furthermore, although Clarke's laws do not classify "sufficiently advanced" technologies, the Kardashev scale measures a civilization's level of technological advancement into types. Due to its exponential nature, sci-fi civilizations usually only attain Type I (harnessing all the energy attainable from a single planet), and strictly speaking often not even that.

=== Alien lifeforms ===
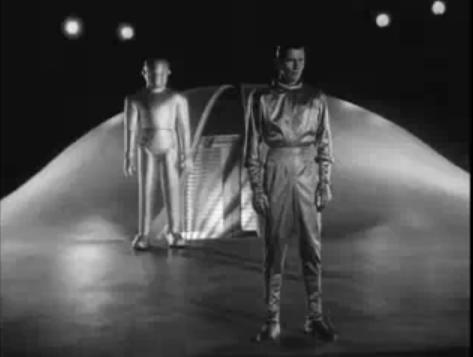
Characters Gort (left) and Klaatu (right) from the 1951 film The Day the Earth Stood Still

The concept of life, particularly intelligent life, having an extraterrestrial origin is a popular staple of science fiction films. Early films often used alien life forms as a threat or peril to the human race, where the invaders were frequently fictional representations of actual military or political threats on Earth as observed in films such as Mars Attacks!, Starship Troopers, the Alien series, the Predator series, and The Chronicles of Riddick series. Some aliens were represented as benign and even beneficial in nature in such films as Escape to Witch Mountain, E.T. the Extra-Terrestrial, Close Encounters of the Third Kind, The Fifth Element, The Hitchhiker's Guide to the Galaxy, Avatar, Valerian and the City of a Thousand Planets, and the Men in Black series.

In order to provide subject matter to which audiences can relate, the large majority of intelligent alien races presented in films have an anthropomorphic nature, possessing human emotions and motivations. In films like Cocoon, My Stepmother Is an Alien, Species, Contact, The Box, Knowing, The Day the Earth Stood Still, and The Watch, the aliens were nearly human in physical appearance, and communicated in a common earth language. However, the aliens in Stargate and Prometheus were human in physical appearance but communicated in an alien language. A few films have tried to represent intelligent aliens as something utterly different from the usual humanoid shape (e.g. An intelligent life form surrounding an entire planet in Solaris, the ball shaped creature in Dark Star, microbial-like creatures in The Invasion, shape-shifting creatures in Evolution). Recent trends in films involve building-size alien creatures like in the movie Pacific Rim where the CGI has tremendously improved over the previous decades as compared in previous films such as Godzilla.

=== Disaster films ===
A frequent theme among science fiction films is that of impending or actual disaster on an epic scale. These often address a particular concern of the writer by serving as a vehicle of warning against a type of activity, including technological research. In the case of alien invasion films, the creatures can provide as a stand-in for a feared foreign power.

Films that fit into the Disaster film typically also fall into the following general categories:

- Alien invasion: Hostile extraterrestrials arrive and seek to supplant humanity. They are either overwhelmingly powerful or very insidious. Typical examples include The War of the Worlds (1953), Invasion of the Body Snatchers (1956), Daleks' Invasion Earth 2150 A.D. (1966), Independence Day (1996), War of the Worlds (2005), The Day the Earth Stood Still (2008), Skyline (2010), The Darkest Hour (2011), Battle: Los Angeles (2011), Battleship (2012), The Avengers (2012), Man of Steel (2013), Pacific Rim (2013), Ender's Game (2013), Pixels (2015), Independence Day: Resurgence (2016), and Justice League (2017). Star Wars: Episode I – The Phantom Menace (1999) takes an alternative look at the subject, involving an extraterrestrial political entity invading planet Naboo for commercial reasons.
- Environmental disaster: such as major climate change, or an asteroid or comet strike. Movies that have employed this theme include Soylent Green (1973), Waterworld (1995), Deep Impact (1998), Armageddon (1998), The Core (2003), The Day After Tomorrow (2004), 2012 (2009), Snowpiercer (2013) and Geostorm (2017).
- Man supplanted by technology: Typically in the form of an all-powerful computer, advanced robots or cyborgs, or else genetically modified humans or animals. Among the films in this category are the Terminator series, The Matrix trilogy, I, Robot (2004), and the Transformers series.
- Nuclear war: Usually in the form of a dystopic, post-holocaust tale of grim survival. Examples of such a storyline can be found in the movies Dr. Strangelove (1964), Dr. Who and the Daleks (1965), Planet of the Apes (1968; remade in 2001), A Boy and His Dog (1975), Mad Max (1979), City of Ember (2008), The Book of Eli (2010), Oblivion (2013), Mad Max: Fury Road (2015), and Friend of the World (2020).
- Pandemic: A highly lethal disease, often one created by man, threatens or wipes out most of humanity in a massive plague. This topic has been treated in such films as The Andromeda Strain (1971), The Omega Man (1971), 12 Monkeys (1995), 28 Weeks Later (2007), I Am Legend (2007), and the Resident Evil series. This version of the genre sometimes mixes with zombie films or other monster movies.

=== Monster films ===
While monster films do not usually depict danger on a global or epic scale, science fiction film also has a long tradition of movies featuring monster attacks. These differ from similar films in the horror or fantasy genres because science fiction films typically rely on a scientific (or at least pseudo-scientific) rationale for the monster's existence, rather than a supernatural or magical reason. Often, the science fiction film monster is created, awakened, or "evolves" because of the machinations of a mad scientist, a nuclear accident, or a scientific experiment gone awry. Typical examples include The Beast from 20,000 Fathoms (1953), Jurassic Park films, Cloverfield, Pacific Rim, Split Second (1992 film), the King Kong films, and the Godzilla franchise or the many films involving Frankenstein's monster.

=== Mind and identity ===
The core mental aspects of what makes us human has been a staple of science fiction films, particularly since the 1980s. Ridley Scott's Blade Runner (1982), an adaptation of Philip K. Dick's novel Do Androids Dream of Electric Sheep?, examined what made an organic-creation a human, while the RoboCop series saw an android mechanism fitted with the brain and reprogrammed mind of a human to create a cyborg. The idea of brain transfer was not entirely new to science fiction film, as the concept of the "mad scientist" transferring the human mind to another body is as old as Frankenstein while the idea of corporations behind mind transfer technologies is observed in later films such as Gamer, Avatar, and Surrogates.

Films such as Total Recall have popularized a thread of films that explore the concept of reprogramming the human mind. The theme of brainwashing in several films of the sixties and seventies including A Clockwork Orange and The Manchurian Candidate coincided with secret real-life government experimentation during Project MKULTRA. Voluntary erasure of memory is further explored as themes of the films Paycheck and Eternal Sunshine of the Spotless Mind. Some films like Limitless explore the concept of mind enhancement. The anime series Serial Experiments Lain also explores the idea of reprogrammable reality and memory.

The idea that a human could be entirely represented as a program in a computer was a core element of the film Tron. This would be further explored in the film version of The Lawnmower Man, Transcendence, and Ready Player One and the idea reversed in Virtuosity as computer programs sought to become real persons. In The Matrix series, the virtual reality world became a real-world prison for humanity, managed by intelligent machines. In movies such as eXistenZ, The Thirteenth Floor, and Inception, the nature of reality and virtual reality become intermixed with no clear distinguishing boundary.

Telekinesis and telepathy are featured in movies like Star Wars, The Last Mimzy, Race to Witch Mountain, Chronicle, and Lucy while precognition is featured in Minority Report as well as in The Matrix saga (in which precognition is achieved by knowing the artificial world).

=== Robots ===
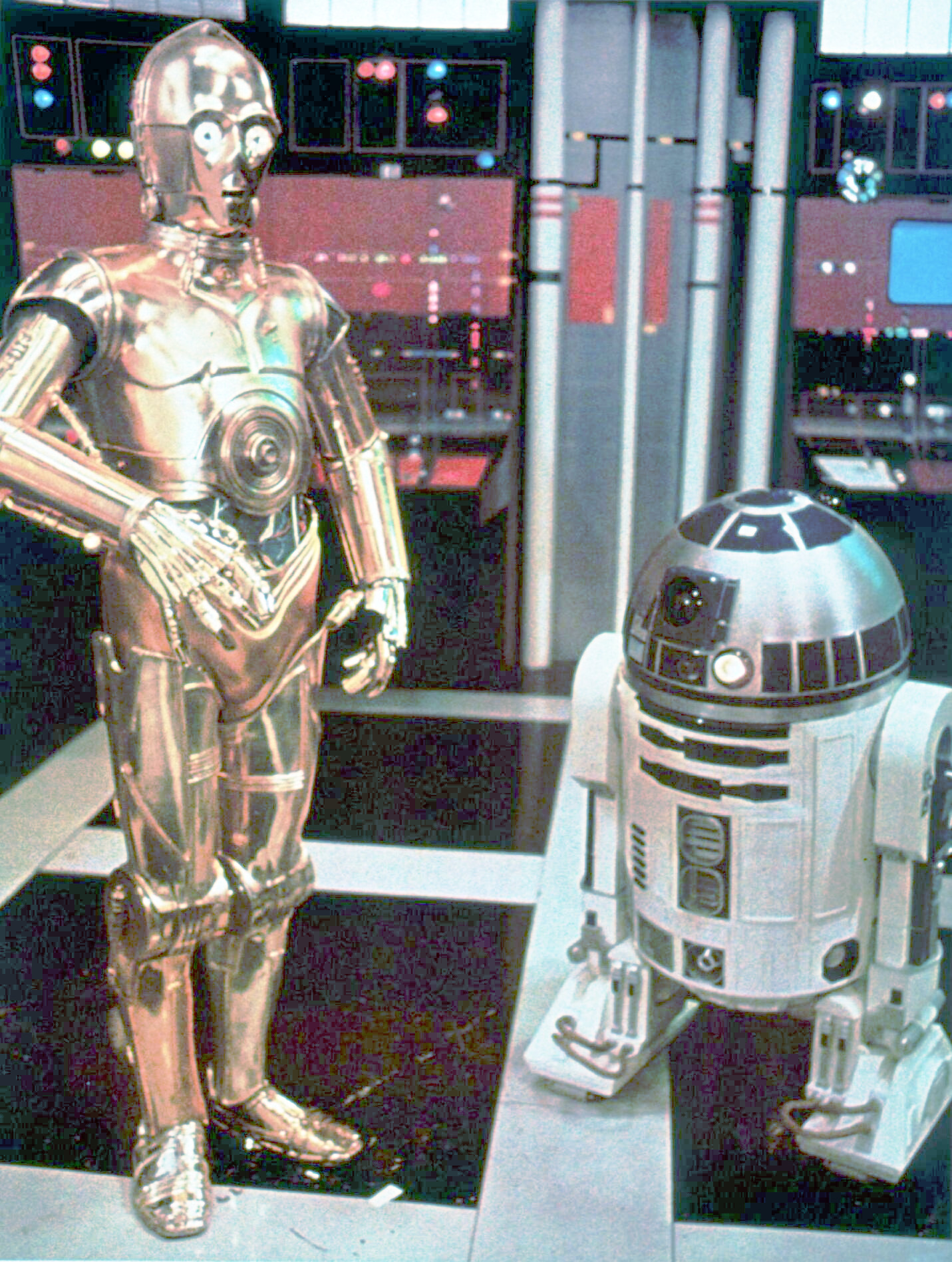
Robot characters C-3PO (left) and R2-D2 (right) from the Star Wars franchise

Robots have been a part of science fiction since the Czech playwright Karel Čapek coined the word in 1921. In early films, robots were usually played by a human actor in a boxy metal suit, as in The Phantom Empire, although the female robot in Metropolis is an exception. The first depiction of a sophisticated robot in a United States film was Gort in The Day the Earth Stood Still.

Robots in films are often sentient and sometimes sentimental, and they have filled a range of roles in science fiction films. Robots have been supporting characters, such as Robby the Robot in Forbidden Planet, Huey, Dewey and Louie in Silent Running, Data in Star Trek: The Next Generation, sidekicks (e.g., C-3PO and R2-D2 from Star Wars, JARVIS from Iron Man), and extras, visible in the background to create a futuristic setting (e.g., Back to the Future Part II (1989), Total Recall (2012), RoboCop (2014)). As well, robots have been formidable movie villains or monsters (e.g., the robot Box in the film Logan's Run (1976), HAL 9000 in 2001: A Space Odyssey, ARIIA in Eagle Eye, robot Sentinels in X-Men: Days of Future Past, the battle droids in the Star Wars prequel trilogy, or the huge robot probes seen in Monsters vs. Aliens). In some cases, robots have even been the leading characters in science fiction films; in the film Blade Runner (1982), many of the characters are bioengineered android "replicants". This is also present in the animated films WALL-E (2008), Astro Boy (2009), Big Hero 6 (2014), Ghost in the Shell (2017) and in Next Gen (2018).

Films like Bicentennial Man, A.I. Artificial Intelligence, Chappie, and Ex Machina depicted the emotional fallouts of robots that are self-aware. Other films like The Animatrix (The Second Renaissance) present the consequences of mass-producing self-aware androids as humanity succumbs to their robot overlords.

One popular theme in science fiction film is whether robots will someday replace humans, a question raised in the film adaptation of Isaac Asimov's I, Robot (in jobs) and in the film Real Steel (in sports), or whether intelligent robots could develop a conscience and a motivation to protect, take over, or destroy the human race (as depicted in The Terminator, Transformers, and in Avengers: Age of Ultron). Another theme is remote telepresence via androids as depicted in Surrogates and Iron Man 3. As artificial intelligence becomes smarter due to increasing computer power, some sci-fi dreams have already been realized. For example, the computer Deep Blue beat the world chess champion in 1997 and a documentary film, Game Over: Kasparov and the Machine, was released in 2003. Another famous computer called Watson defeated the two best human Jeopardy (game show) players in 2011 and a NOVA documentary film, Smartest Machine on Earth, was released in the same year.

Building-size robots are also becoming a popular theme in movies as featured in Pacific Rim. Future live action films may include an adaptation of popular television series like Voltron and Robotech. The CGI robots of Pacific Rim and the Power Rangers (2017) reboot was greatly improved as compared to the original Mighty Morphin Power Rangers: The Movie (1995). While "size does matter", a famous tagline of the movie Godzilla, incredibly small robots, called nanobots, do matter as well (e.g. Borg nanoprobes in Star Trek and nanites in I, Robot).

=== Time travel ===
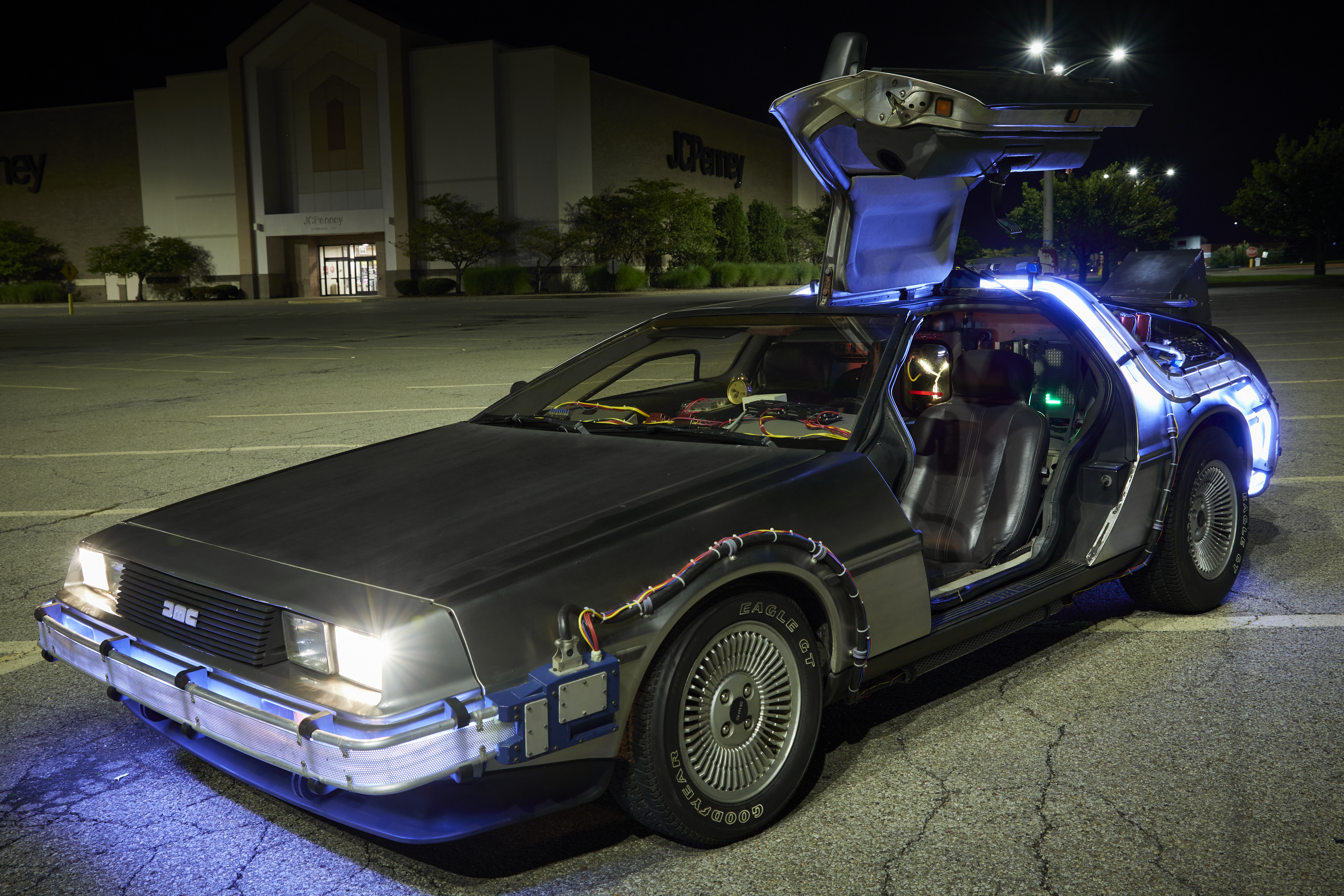
A replica of the DeLorean time machine from the Back to the Future franchise

The concept of time travel—travelling backwards and forwards through time—has always been a popular staple of science fiction film and science fiction television series. Time travel usually involves the use of some type of advanced technology, such as H. G. Wells' classic The Time Machine, the commercially successful 1980s-era Back to the Future trilogy, the Bill & Ted trilogy, the Terminator series, Déjà Vu (2006), Source Code (2011), Edge of Tomorrow (2014), and Predestination (2014). Other movies, such as the Planet of the Apes series, Timeline (2003) and The Last Mimzy (2007), explained their depictions of time travel by drawing on physics concepts such as the special relativity phenomenon of time dilation (which could occur if a spaceship was travelling near the speed of light) and wormholes. Some films show time travel not being attained from advanced technology, but rather from an inner source or personal power, such as the 2000s-era films Donnie Darko, Mr. Nobody, The Butterfly Effect, and X-Men: Days of Future Past.

More conventional time travel movies use technology to bring the past to life in the present, or in a present that lies in our future. The film Iceman (1984) told the story of the reanimation of a frozen Neanderthal. The film Freejack (1992) shows time travel used to pull victims of horrible deaths forward in time a split-second before their demise, and then use their bodies for spare parts.

A common theme in time travel film is the paradoxical nature of travelling through time. In the French New Wave film La jetée (1962), director Chris Marker depicts the self-fulfilling aspect of a person being able to see their future by showing a child who witnesses the death of his future self. La Jetée was the inspiration for 12 Monkeys, (1995) director Terry Gilliam's film about time travel, memory and madness. The Back to the Future trilogy and The Time Machine go one step further and explore the result of altering the past, while in Star Trek: First Contact (1996) and Star Trek (2009) the crew must rescue the Earth from having its past altered by time-travelling cyborgs and alien races.

== Genre as commentary on social issues ==
The science fiction film genre has long served as useful means of discussing sensitive topical issues without arousing controversy, and it often provides thoughtful social commentary on potential unforeseen future issues. The fictional setting allows for a deeper examination and reflection of the ideas presented, with the perspective of a viewer watching remote events. Most controversial issues in science fiction films tend to fall into two general storylines, Utopian or dystopian. Either a society will become better or worse in the future. Because of controversy, most science fiction films will fall into the dystopian film category rather than the Utopian category.

The types of commentary and controversy presented in science fiction films often illustrate the particular concerns of the periods in which they were produced. Early science fiction films expressed fears about automation replacing workers and the dehumanization of society through science and technology. For example, The Man in the White Suit (1951) used a science fiction concept as a means to satirize postwar British "establishment" conservatism, industrial capitalists, and trade unions. Another example is HAL 9000 from 2001: A Space Odyssey (1968). He controls the shuttle, and later harms its crew. "Kubrick's vision reveals technology as a competitive force that must be defeated in order for humans to evolve." Later films explored the fears of environmental catastrophe, technology-created disasters, or overpopulation, and how they would impact society and individuals (e.g. Soylent Green, Elysium).

The monster movies of the 1950s—like Godzilla (1954)—served as stand-ins for fears of nuclear war, communism and views on the Cold War. In the 1970s, science fiction films also became an effective way of satirizing contemporary social mores with Silent Running and Dark Star presenting hippies in space as a riposte to the militaristic types that had dominated earlier films. Stanley Kubrick's A Clockwork Orange presented a horrific vision of youth culture, portraying a youth gang engaged in rape and murder, along with disturbing scenes of forced psychological conditioning serving to comment on societal responses to crime.

Logan's Run depicted a futuristic swingers' utopia that practiced euthanasia as a form of population control and The Stepford Wives anticipated a reaction to the women's liberation movement. Enemy Mine demonstrated that the foes we have come to hate are often just like us, even if they appear alien.

Contemporary science fiction films continue to explore social and political issues. One recent example is Minority Report (2002), debuting in the months after the terrorist attacks of September 11, 2001, and focused on the issues of police powers, privacy and civil liberties in a near-future United States. Some movies like The Island (2005) and Never Let Me Go (2010) explore the issues surrounding cloning.

More recently, the headlines surrounding events such as the Iraq War, international terrorism, the avian influenza scare, and United States anti-immigration laws have found their way into the consciousness of contemporary filmmakers. The film V for Vendetta (2006) drew inspiration from controversial issues such as the Patriot Act and the war on terror, while science fiction thrillers such as Children of Men (also 2006), District 9 (2009), and Elysium (2013) commented on diverse social issues such as xenophobia, propaganda, and cognitive dissonance. Avatar (2009) had remarkable resemblance to colonialism of native land, mining by multinational-corporations and the Iraq War.

=== Future noir ===
Lancaster University professor Jamaluddin Bin Aziz argues that as science fiction has evolved and expanded, it has fused with other film genres such as gothic thrillers and film noir. When science fiction integrates film noir elements, Bin Aziz calls the resulting hybrid form "future noir", a form which "... encapsulates a postmodern encounter with generic persistence, creating a mixture of irony, pessimism, prediction, extrapolation, bleakness and nostalgia." Future noir films such as Brazil, Blade Runner, 12 Monkeys, Dark City, and Children of Men use a protagonist who is "...increasingly dubious, alienated and fragmented", at once "dark and playful like the characters in Gibson's Neuromancer, yet still with the "... shadow of Philip Marlowe..."

Future noir films that are set in a post-apocalyptic world "...restructure and re-represent society in a parody of the atmospheric world usually found in noir's construction of a city—dark, bleak and beguiled." Future noir films often intermingle elements of the gothic thriller genre, such as Minority Report, which makes references to occult practices, and Alien, with its tagline "In space, no one can hear you scream", and a space vessel, Nostromo, "that hark[s] back to images of the haunted house in the gothic horror tradition". Bin Aziz states that films such as James Cameron’s The Terminator are a subgenre of "techno noir" that create "...an atmospheric feast of noir darkness and a double-edged world that is not what it seems."

== Film versus literature ==
When compared to science-fiction literature, science-fiction films often rely less on the human imagination and more upon action scenes and special effect-created alien creatures and exotic backgrounds. Since the 1970s, film audiences have come to expect a high standard for special effects in science-fiction films. In some cases, science fiction-themed films superimpose an exotic, futuristic setting onto what would not otherwise be a science-fiction tale. Nevertheless, some critically acclaimed science-fiction movies have followed in the path of science-fiction literature, using story development to explore abstract concepts.

=== Influence of science fiction authors ===
Jules Verne (1828–1905) became the first major science-fiction author whose works film-makers adapted for the screen - with Méliès' Le Voyage dans la Lune (1902) and 20,000 lieues sous les mers (1907), which used Verne's scenarios as a framework for fantastic visuals. By the time Verne's work fell out of copyright in 1950, the adaptations were generally adapted as costume dramas with a Victorian aesthetic. Verne's works have been adapted a number of times since then, including 20,000 Leagues Under the Sea (1954), From the Earth to the Moon (1958), and two film versions of Journey to the Center of the Earth in 1959 and 2008.

H. G. Wells's novels The Invisible Man, Things to Come and The Island of Doctor Moreau were all adapted into films during his lifetime (1866–1946), while The War of the Worlds, updated in 1953 and again in 2005, was adapted to film at least four times altogether. The Time Machine has had two film versions (1960 and 2002) while Sleeper in part is a pastiche of Wells's 1910 novel The Sleeper Awakes.

With the drop-off in interest in science-fiction films during the 1940s, few of the "golden age" science-fiction authors made it to the screen. A novella by John W. Campbell provided the basis for The Thing from Another World (1951). Robert A. Heinlein contributed to the screenplay for Destination Moon (1950), but none of his major works were adapted for the screen until the 1990s: The Puppet Masters (1994) and Starship Troopers (1997). The fiction of Isaac Asimov (1920–1992) influenced the Star Wars and Star Trek films, but it was not until 1988 that a film version of one of his short stories (Nightfall) was produced. The first major motion-picture adaptation of a full-length Asimov work was Bicentennial Man (1999) (based on the short stories Bicentennial Man (1976) and The Positronic Man (1992), the latter co-written with Robert Silverberg), although I, Robot (2004), a film loosely based on Asimov's book of short stories by the same name, drew more attention.

The 1968 film adaptation of some of the stories of science-fiction author Arthur C. Clarke as 2001: A Space Odyssey won the Academy Award for Visual Effects and offered thematic complexity not typically associated with the science-fiction genre at the time. Its sequel, 2010: The Year We Make Contact (inspired to Clarke's 2010: Odyssey Two), was commercially successful but less highly regarded by critics. Reflecting the times, two earlier science-fiction works by Ray Bradbury were adapted for cinema in the 1960s: Fahrenheit 451 (1966) and The Illustrated Man (1969). Kurt Vonnegut's Slaughterhouse-Five was filmed in 1971 and Breakfast of Champions in 1998.

Philip K. Dick's fiction has been used in a number of science-fiction films, in part because it evokes the paranoia that has been a central feature of the genre. Films based on Dick's works include Blade Runner (1982), Total Recall (1990), Impostor (2001), Minority Report (2002), Paycheck (2003), A Scanner Darkly (2006), and The Adjustment Bureau (2011). These films represent loose adaptations of the original stories, with the exception of A Scanner Darkly, which is more inclined to Dick's novel.

== Market share ==
The estimated North American box-office market-share of science fiction as of 2019 comprised 4.77%.

== See also ==
- Genres, subcategories and related topics to science fiction
- Hugo Award for Best Dramatic Presentation
- List of dystopian films
- List of films set in the future
- Saturn Award for Best Science Fiction Film

== General and cited references ==
- Luca Bandirali, Enrico Terrone, Nell'occhio, nel cielo. Teoria e storia del cinema di fantascienza, Turin: Lindau, 2008, ISBN 978-88-7180-716-4.
- Welch Everman, Cult Science Fiction Films, Citadel Press, 1995, ISBN 0-8065-1602-X.
- Peter Guttmacher, Legendary Sci-Fi Movies, 1997, ISBN 1-56799-490-3.
- Phil Hardy, The Overlook Film Encyclopedia, Science Fiction. William Morrow and Company, New York, 1995, ISBN 0-87951-626-7.
- Richard S. Myers, S-F 2: A pictorial history of science fiction from 1975 to the present, 1984, Citadel Press, ISBN 0-8065-0875-2.
- Gregg Rickman, The Science Fiction Film Reader, 2004, ISBN 0-87910-994-7.
- Matthias Schwartz, Archeologies of a Past Future. Science Fiction Films from Communist Eastern Europe, in: Rainer Rother, Annika Schaefer (eds.): Future Imperfect. Science – Fiction – Film, Berlin 2007, pp. 96–117. ISBN 978-3-86505-249-0.
- Dave Saunders, Arnold: Schwarzenegger and the Movies, 2009, London, I. B. Tauris
- Errol Vieth, Screening Science: Context, Text and Science in Fifties Science Fiction Film, Lanham, MD and London: Scarecrow Press, 2001. ISBN 0-8108-4023-5.
