= Lock Martin =

American actor (1916–1959)

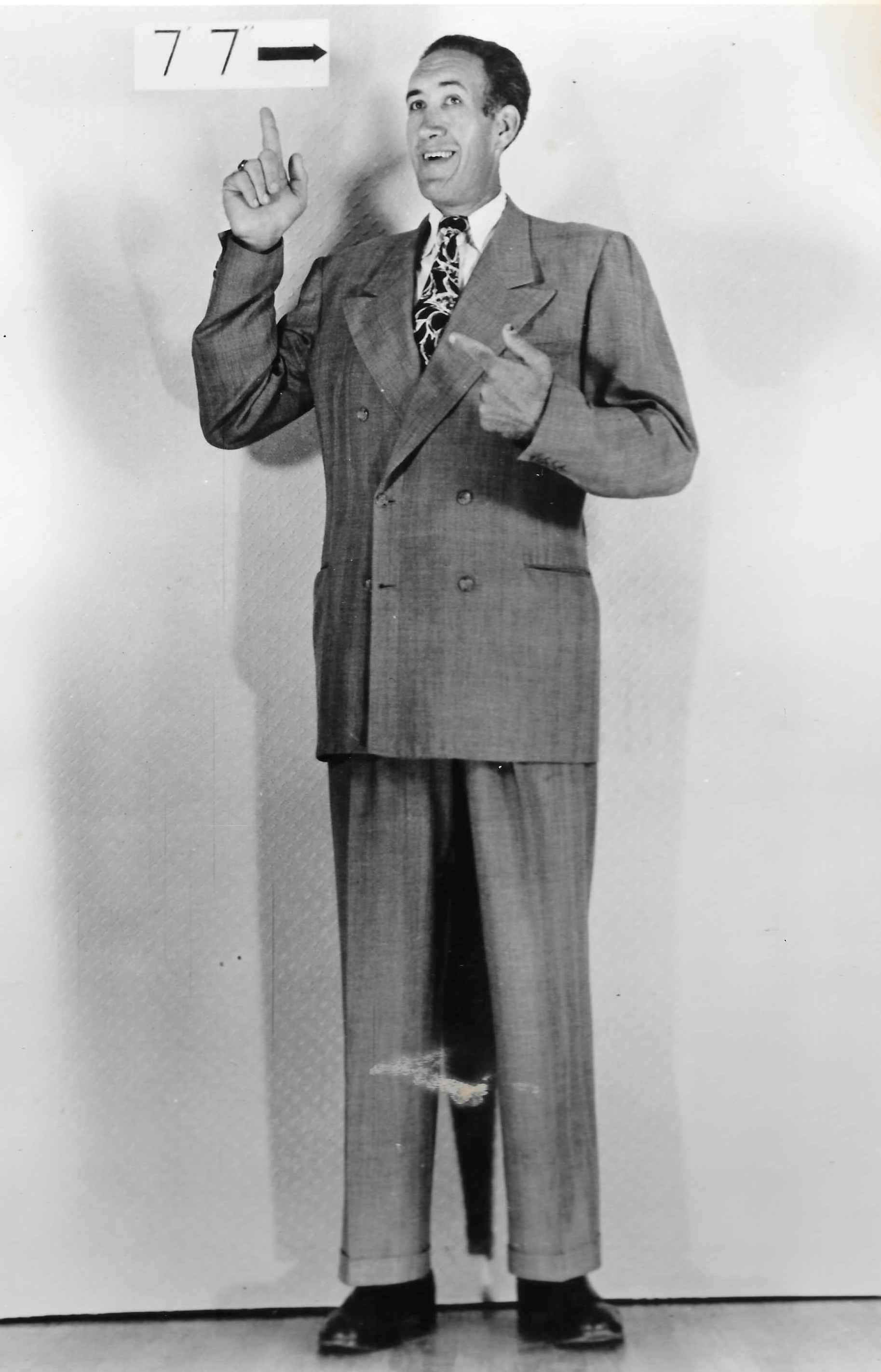
- Born: Joseph Lockard Martin Jr. October 12, 1916; Philadelphia, Pennsylvania, U.S.
- Died: January 19, 1959 (aged 42); Los Angeles County, California, U.S.
- Years active: 1944–1957
- Height: 7 ft 7 in (2.31 m)
- Spouse(s): Ethel Mae Babcock (7 June 1946 – his death)

Joseph Lockard "Lock" Martin Jr. (October 12, 1916 – January 19, 1959) was an American performer afflicted with gigantism. Martin and a twin brother were born in South Philadelphia, Pennsylvania; his brother died in childbirth.

Martin grew to over 7 feet (2.1 m) tall, though his exact height was reported inconsistently. He became notable for appearing as the robot Gort in The Day the Earth Stood Still (1951). Despite his size, he had difficulty moving in the heavy robot suit, and during scenes in which he was supposed to lift and carry either Patricia Neal or Michael Rennie, they were either held up by wires, or replaced with lightweight dummies.

Martin traveled with Spike Jones and His City Slickers and appeared on their television show in the early 1950s. He also worked as a doorman at Grauman's Chinese Theatre in Los Angeles. He can also be heard as a contestant on the November 14, 1951 edition of You Bet Your Life.

Towards the end of his career, he was filmed for a part in The Incredible Shrinking Man as a circus giant, but his scenes were deleted.

== Filmography ==
- Lost in a Harem (1944) – Bobo (as J. Lockard Martin)
- Anchors Aweigh (1945) – Giant
- Lady on a Train (1945) – Circus Club Doorman
- The Day the Earth Stood Still (1951) – Gort
- Four Star Revue (1952, TV Series) – Giant at Hollywood Bowl
- Million Dollar Mermaid (1952) – Giant
- Off Limits (1953) – Big Sailor
- Invaders from Mars (1953) – Mutant carrying David to "Intelligence"
- The Snow Creature (1954) – Yeti
- The Incredible Shrinking Man (1957) – Giant (scenes deleted)
