= Film genre =

Classification of films based on similarities in narrative elements

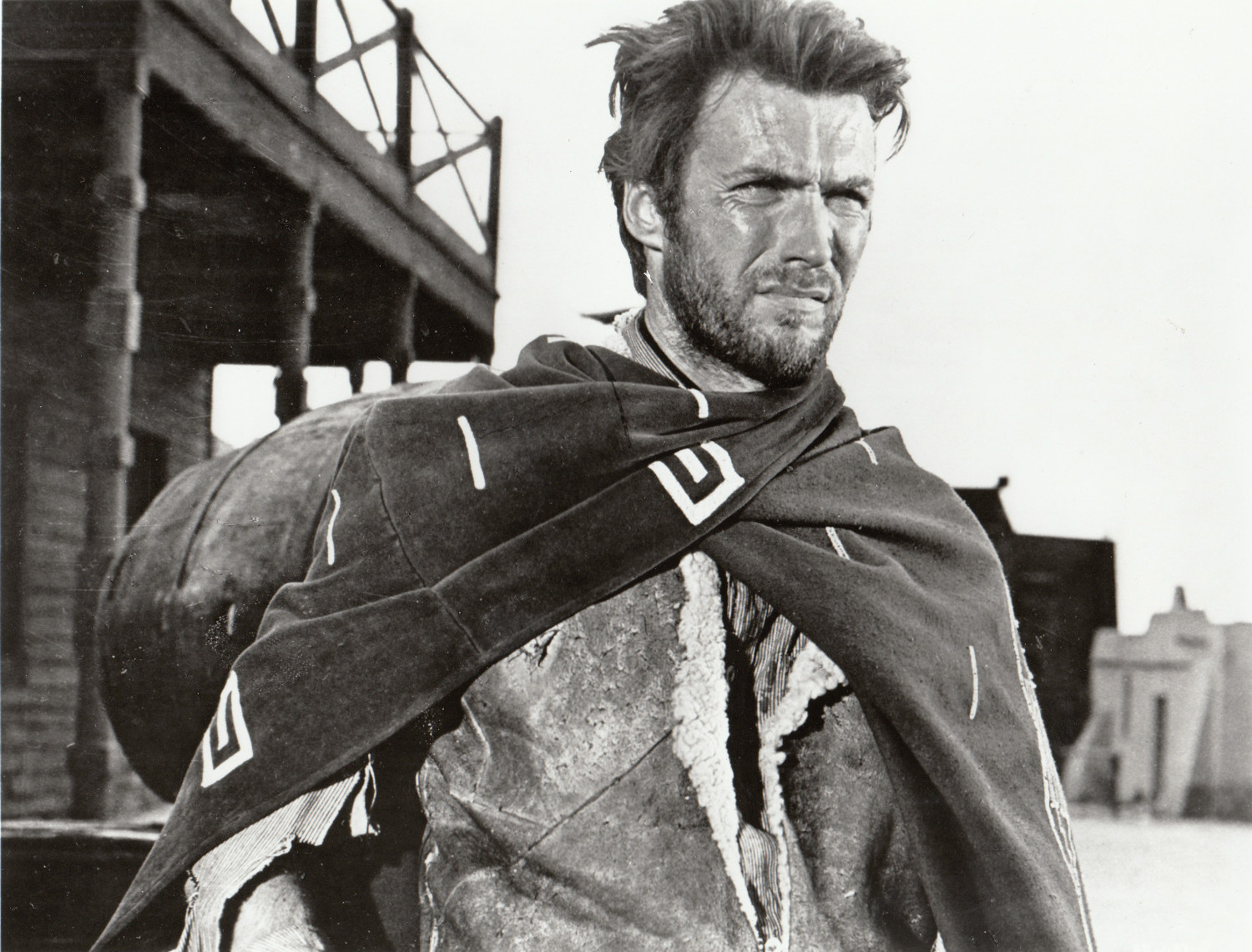
Western films are those "set in the American West that embod[y] the spirit, the struggle and the demise of the new frontier". Pictured: Clint Eastwood in the Spaghetti Western film A Fistful of Dollars (1964).

A film genre is a stylistic or thematic category for motion pictures based on similarities either in the narrative elements, aesthetic approach, or the emotional response to the film.

Drawing heavily from the theories of literary-genre criticism, film genres are usually delineated by "conventions, iconography, settings, narratives, characters and actors". One can also classify films by the tone, theme/topic, mood, format, target audience, or budget. These characteristics are most evident in genre films, which are "commercial feature films [that], through repetition and variation, tell familiar stories with familiar characters and familiar situations" in a given genre.

A film's genre will influence the use of filmmaking styles and techniques, such as the use of flashbacks and low-key lighting in film noir; tight framing in horror films; or fonts that look like rough-hewn logs for the titles of Western films. In addition, genres have associated film scoring conventions, such as lush string orchestras for romantic melodramas or electronic music for science fiction films. Genre also affects how films are broadcast on television, advertised, and organized in video rental stores.

Alan Williams distinguishes three main genre categories: narrative, avant-garde, and documentary.

With the proliferation of particular genres, film subgenres can also emerge: the legal drama, for example, is a sub-genre of drama that includes courtroom- and trial-focused films. Subgenres are often a mixture of two separate genres; genres can also merge with seemingly unrelated ones to form hybrid genres, where popular combinations include the romantic comedy and the action comedy film. Broader examples include the docufiction and docudrama, which merge the basic categories of fiction and non-fiction (documentary).

Genres are not fixed; they change and evolve over time, and some genres may largely disappear (for example, the melodrama). Not only does genre refer to a type of film or its category, a key role is also played by the expectations of an audience about a film, as well as institutional discourses that create generic structures.

== Overview ==
=== Characteristics ===
Characteristics of particular genres are most evident in genre films, which are "commercial feature films [that], through repetition and variation, tell familiar stories with familiar characters and familiar situations" in a given genre.

Drawing heavily from the theories of literary-genre criticism, film genres are usually delineated by conventions, iconography, narratives, formats, characters, and actors, all of which can vary according to the genre. In terms of standard or "stock" characters, those in film noir, for example, include the femme fatale and the "hardboiled" detective; while those in Westerns, stock characters include the schoolmarm and the gunslinger. Regarding actors, some may acquire a reputation linked to a single genre, such as John Wayne (the Western) or Fred Astaire (the musical). Some genres have been characterized or known to use particular formats, which refers to the way in which films are shot (e.g., 35 mm, 16 mm or 8 mm) or the manner of presentation (e.g., anamorphic widescreen).

Genres can also be classified by more inherent characteristics (usually implied in their names), such as settings, theme/topic, mood, target audience, or budget/type of production.

- The setting is the environment—including both time and geographic location—in which the story and action take place (e.g., present day or historical period; Earth or outer-space; urban or rural, etc.). Genres that are particularly concerned with this element include the historical drama, war film, Western, and space-opera, the names of which all denote particular settings.
- The theme or topic refers to the issues or concepts that the film revolves around; for example, the science fiction film, sports film, and crime film.
- The mood is the emotional tone of the film, as implied in the names of the comedy film, horror film, or 'tearjerker'.
- Genres informed by particular target audience(s) include children's film, teen film, woman's film, and "chick flick".
- Genres characterized by the type of production include the blockbuster, independent film, and low-budget film, such as the B movie (commercial) or amateur film (non-commercial).

Screenwriters, in particular, often organize their stories by genre, focusing their attention on three specific aspects: atmosphere, character, and story. A film's atmosphere includes costumes, props, locations, and the visceral experiences created for the audience. Aspects of character include archetypes, stock characters, and the goals and motivations of the central characters. Some story considerations for screenwriters, as they relate to genre, include theme, tent-pole scenes, and how the rhythm of characters' perspective shift from scene to scene.

== Examples of genres and subgenres ==
Genres and subgenres
Genre	Description	Subgenre(s)	Examples
Action film	Associated with particular types of spectacle (e.g., explosions, chases, combat)	Disaster film; Heroic bloodshed: defined by stylized action sequences and themes such as duty, brotherhood, honour, redemption.; Martial arts film: focusing on the excitement and values of martial arts; Spy film: centered on the excitement and entertainment of espionage rather than political or psychological aspects.; Superhero film; War film	Commando (1985); Die Hard (1988); Face/Off (1997); The Last Samurai (2003); Pushpa: The Rise (2021)
Adventure film	Implies a narrative that is defined by a journey (often including some form of pursuit) and is usually located within a fantasy or exoticized setting. Typically, though not always, such stories include the quest narrative. The predominant emphasis on violence and fighting in action films is the typical difference between the two genres.	Pirate film; Swashbuckler film; Samurai film	Swiss Family Robinson (1960); Romancing the Stone (1984); Wanted: Dead or Alive (1984); Stardust (2007); Jungle Cruise (2021)
Animated film	A film medium in which the film's images are primarily created by computer or hand and the characters are voiced by actors. Animation can incorporate any genre and subgenre.	CGI animation; Cutout animation; Live-action animated film; Stop motion film; Claymation; Traditional animation	Snow White and the Seven Dwarfs (1937); Toy Story (1995); Spirited Away (2001); Wallace & Gromit: The Curse of the Were-Rabbit (2005); Ne Zha 2 (2025)
Comedy film	Defined by events that are primarily intended to make the audience laugh.	Action comedy film; Buddy comedy; Dark/black comedy film; Mockumentary; Parody film (including spoof film); Screwball comedy; Slapstick film	Safety Last! (1923); Some Like It Hot (1959); Caddyshack (1980); Old School (2003); 3 Idiots (2009)
Drama film	Focused on emotions and defined by conflict, often looking to reality rather than sensationalism.	Docudrama; Legal drama; Medical drama; Political drama; Psychological drama; Teen drama	The Grapes of Wrath (1940); Citizen Kane (1941); The Shawshank Redemption (1994); Sooryavansham (1999); Changeling (2008)
Fantasy film	Films defined by situations that transcend natural laws and/or by settings inside a fictional universe, with narratives that are often inspired by or involve human myths.	Contemporary fantasy; Dark fantasy; High/epic fantasy; Urban fantasy	The Wizard of Oz (1939); Willy Wonka & the Chocolate Factory (1971); Harry Potter and the Philosopher's Stone (2001); The Lord of the Rings: The Fellowship of the Ring (2001); Brahmāstra: Part One – Shiva (2022)
Historical film	Films that either provide more-or-less accurate representations of historical accounts or depict fictional narratives placed inside an accurate depiction of a historical setting.	Alternate history; Biopic; Historical epic; Historical event; Historical fiction; Period piece	Joymoti (1935); Cleopatra (1963); Schindler's List (1993); Gladiator (2000); RRR (2022)
Horror film	Films that seek to elicit fear or disgust in the audience for entertainment purposes.	Found footage; Ghost films; Monster movie; Vampire films; Werewolf films; Slasher film; Splatter film; Zombie film; Supernatural horror	Frankenstein (1931); Night of the Living Dead (1968); The Exorcist (1973); Shaun of the Dead (2004); Tumbbad (2018)
Melodrama	A genre, mode, style or sensibility characterized by an emphasis on intense and exaggerated emotions and heightened dramatic situations. Much like film noir, its recognition as a genre with specific formal and thematic characteristics came retrospectively, and was driven by a 1970s critical re-evaluation of the films of Douglas Sirk, who came to be considered the greatest exponent of melodrama. The canonical form of melodrama, associated with the 1950s Hollywood films of Sirk, Vincente Minnelli, Nicholas Ray, George Cukor, Billy Wilder and Joseph Losey, among others, is known as "family melodrama" and centers on middle-class family conflicts, often generational, within contexts of social mobility and emotional trauma. Unlike drama, melodrama functions as a code that opposes realism, exaggerating the conventions of representation and mise-en-scène to depict the emotional states of the characters.	Korean melodrama	Way Down East (1920); Brief Encounter (1945); All That Heaven Allows (1955); Imitation of Life (1959)
Musical film	A genre in which songs performed by the characters are interwoven into the narrative, sometimes accompanied by dancing. The songs usually advance the plot or develop the film's characters or may serve merely as breaks in the storyline, often as elaborate "production numbers".	Jukebox musical; Sung-through musical	Singin' in the Rain (1952); West Side Story (1961); The Rocky Horror Picture Show (1975); Moulin Rouge! (2001); Secret Superstar (2017)
Noir film	A genre of stylish crime dramas particularly popular during the 1940s and '50s. They were often reflective of the American society and culture at the time.	Neo-noir; Horror-noir; Tech-noir; Pulp-noir; Rural-noir	The Letter (1940); Laura (1944); Chinatown (1974); Blood Simple (1984); Marco (2024)
Pornographic film	Pornographic films are typically categorized as either softcore or hardcore pornography. In general, softcore pornography is pornography that does not depict explicit sexual activity, sexual penetration or extreme fetishism. It generally contains nudity or partial nudity in sexually suggestive situations. Hardcore pornography is pornography that depicts penetration or extreme fetish acts, or both. It contains graphic sexual activity and visible penetration.	Erotic horror	Blue Movie (1969); Mona the Virgin Nymph (1970); Deep Throat (1972); Behind the Green Door (1972); The Devil in Miss Jones (1973); The Opening of Misty Beethoven (1976)
Romance film	Characterized by an emphasis on passion, emotion, and the affectionate romantic involvement of the main characters, with romantic love or the search for it typically being the primary focus.	Historical romance; Paranormal romance; Romantic comedy; Romantic drama; Romantic fantasy; Romantic thriller	Gone with the Wind (1939); Casablanca (1942); When Harry Met Sally... (1989); Ghost (1990); Aashiqui 2 (2014)
Science fiction film	Films are defined by a combination of imaginative speculation and a scientific or technological premise, making use of the changes and trajectory of technology and science.	Dystopian film; Post-apocalyptic film; Military science fiction; Steampunk film; Tech noir; Utopian film; Space opera	2001: A Space Odyssey (1968); Star Wars (1977); Back to the Future (1985); Gravity (2013); Kalki 2898 AD (2024)
Thriller film	Films that evoke excitement and suspense in the audience. The suspense element found in most films' plots is particularly exploited by the filmmaker in this genre. Tension is created by delaying what the audience sees as inevitable, and is built through situations that are menacing or where escape seems impossible.	Psychological thriller; Mystery film; Techno-thriller; Political thriller	M (1931); Deliverance (1972); Fight Club (1999); Runaway Jury (2003); L2: Empuraan (2025)
Western film	A genre in which films are set in the American West during the 19th century.	Epic Western; Revisionist Western; Spaghetti Western	Stagecoach (1939); The Good, the Bad and the Ugly (1966); True Grit (1969); Tombstone (1993)

== History ==
From the earliest days of cinema in the 19th century the term "genre" (already in use in English with reference to works of art or literary production from at least 1770) was used to organize films according to type. By the 1950s André Bazin was discussing the concept of "genre" by using the Western film as an example; during this era, there was a debate over auteur theory versus genre. In the late 1960s the concept of genre became a significant part of film theory.

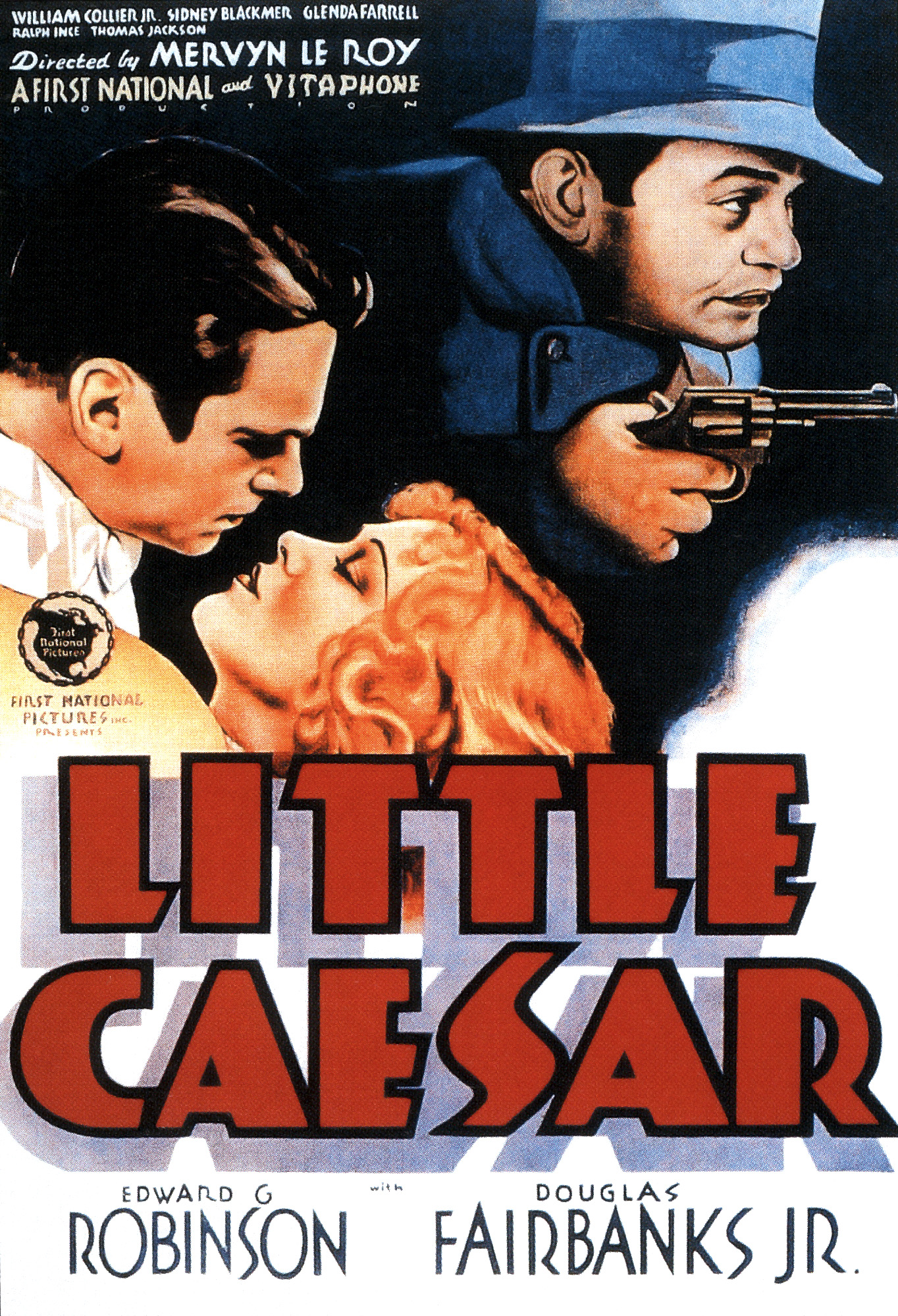
Theatrical release poster of the 1931 American film Little Caesar.

Film genres draw on genres from other forms; Western novels existed before the Western film, and musical theatre pre-dated film musicals. The perceived genre of a film can change over time; for example, in the 21st century The Great Train Robbery (1903) classes as a key early Western film, but when released, marketing promoted it "for its relation to the then-popular genres of the chase film, the railroad film and the crime film". A key reason that the early Hollywood industrial system from the 1920s to the 1950s favoured genre films is that in "Hollywood's industrial mode of production, genre movies are dependable products" to market to audiences – they were easy to produce and it was easy for audiences to understand a genre film. In the 1920s to 1950s, genre films had clear conventions and iconography, such as the heavy coats worn by gangsters in films like Little Caesar (1931). The conventions in genre films enable filmmakers to generate them in an industrial, assembly-line fashion, an approach which can be seen in the James Bond spy-films, which all use a formula of "lots of action, fancy gadgets, beautiful woman and colourful villains", even though the actors, directors and screenwriters change.

== Pure and hybrid genres ==
Films are rarely purely from one genre, which is in keeping with the cinema's diverse and derivative origins, it being a blend of "vaudeville, music-hall, theatre, photography" and novels. American film historian Janet Staiger states that the genre of a film can be defined in four ways. The "idealist method" judges films by predetermined standards. The "empirical method" identifies the genre of a film by comparing it to a list of films already deemed to fall within a certain genre. The a priori method uses common generic elements which are identified in advance. The "social conventions" method of identifying the genre of a film is based on the accepted cultural consensus within society. Martin Loop contends that Hollywood films are not pure genres because most Hollywood movies blend the love-oriented plot of the romance genre with other genres. Jim Colins claims that since the 1980s, Hollywood films have been influenced by the trend towards "ironic hybridization", in which directors combine elements from different genres, as with the Western/science fiction mix in Back to the Future Part III.

Many films cross into multiple genres. Susan Hayward states that spy films often cross genre boundaries with thriller films. Some genre films take genre elements from one genre and place them into the conventions of a second genre, such as with The Band Wagon (1953), which adds film noir and detective film elements into "The Girl Hunt" ballet. In the 1970s New Hollywood era, there was so much parodying of genres that it can be hard to assign genres to some films from this era, such as Mel Brooks' comedy-Western Blazing Saddles (1974) or the private eye parody The Long Goodbye (1973). Other films from this era bend genres so much that it is challenging to put them in a genre category, such as Roman Polanski's Chinatown (1974) and William Friedkin's The French Connection (1971).

Film theorist Robert Stam challenged whether genres really exist, or whether they are merely made up by critics. Stam has questioned whether "genres [are] really 'out there' in the world or are they really the construction of analysts?". As well, he has asked whether there is a "... finite taxonomy of genres or are they in principle infinite?" and whether genres are "...timeless essences ephemeral, time-bound entities? Are genres culture-bound or trans-cultural?". Stam has also asked whether genre analysis should aim at being descriptive or prescriptive. While some genres are based on story content (the war film), other are borrowed from literature (comedy, melodrama) or from other media (the musical). Some are performer-based (Fred Astaire and Ginger Rogers films) or budget-based (blockbusters, low-budget film), while others are based on artistic status (the art film), racial identity (race films), location (the Western), or sexual orientation ("New Queer Cinema").

== Audience expectations ==
Many genres have built-in audiences and corresponding publications that support them, such as magazines and websites. For example, horror films have a well-established fanbase that reads horror magazines such as Fangoria. Films that are difficult to categorize into a genre are often less successful. As such, film genres are also useful in the areas of marketing, film criticism and the analysis of consumption. Hollywood story consultant John Truby states that "...you have to know how to transcend the forms [genres] so you can give the audience a sense of originality and surprise".

Some screenwriters use genre as a means of determining what kind of plot or content to put into a screenplay. They may study films of specific genres to find examples. This is a way that some screenwriters are able to copy elements of successful movies and pass them off in a new screenplay. It is likely that such screenplays fall short in originality. As Truby says, "Writers know enough to write a genre script but they haven't twisted the story beats of that genre in such a way that it gives an original face to it".

Cinema technologies are associated with genres. Huge widescreens helped Western films to create an expansive setting of the open plains and desert. Science fiction and fantasy films are associated with special effects, notably computer generated imagery (e.g., the Harry Potter films).

In 2017, screenwriter Eric R. Williams published a system for screenwriters to conceptualize narrative film genres based on audience expectations. The system was based upon the structure biologists use to analyze living beings. Williams wrote a companion book detailing his taxonomy, which claims to be able to identify all feature length narrative films with seven categorizations: film type, super genre, macro-genre, micro-genre, voice, and pathway.

== Categorization ==
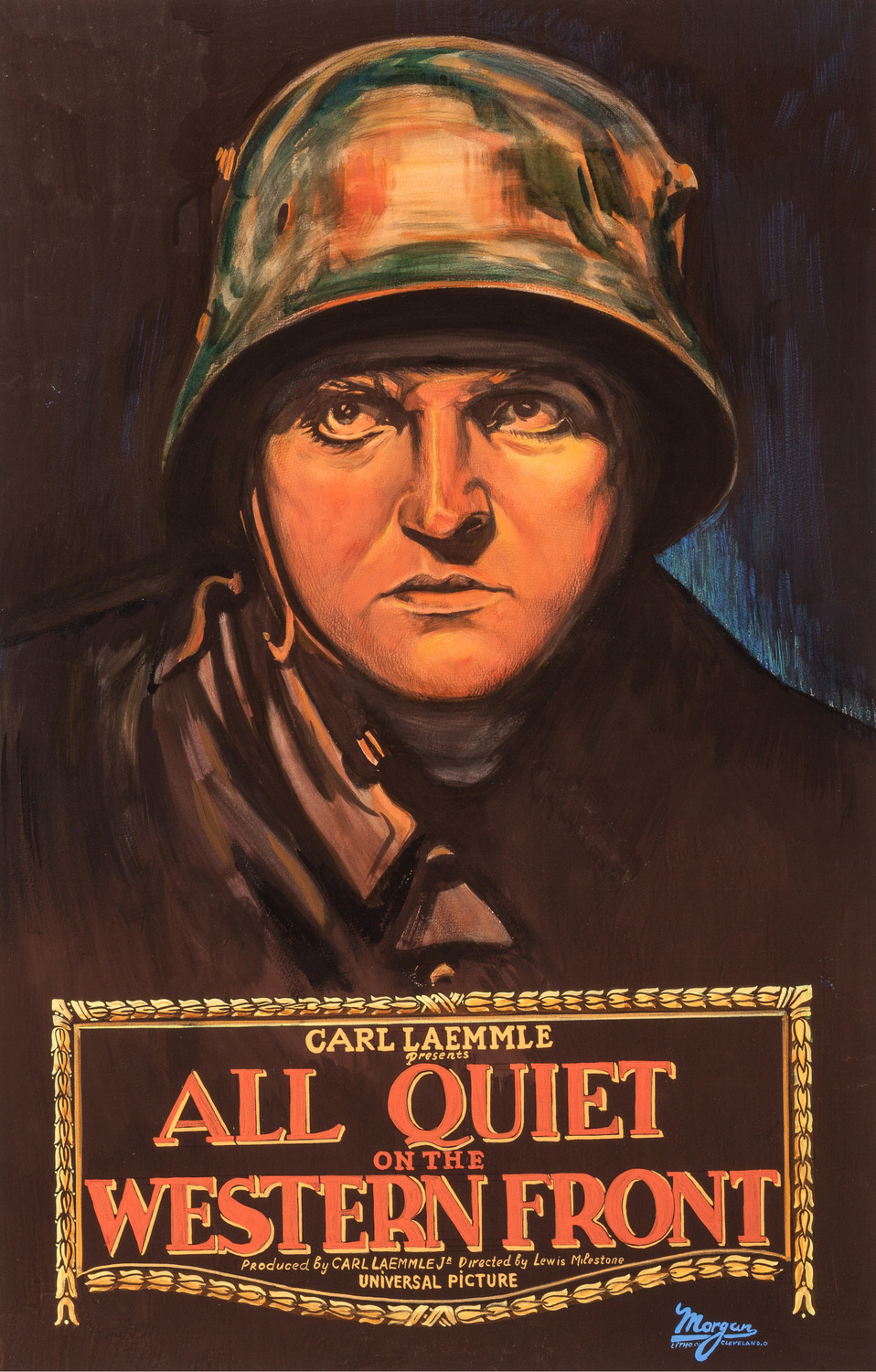
War film or anti-war movie: Lewis Milestone's All Quiet on the Western Front, 1930

Because genres are easier to recognize than to define, academics agree they cannot be identified in a rigid way. Furthermore, different countries and cultures define genres in different ways. A typical example are war movies. In United States, they are mostly related to ones with large U.S. involvement such as World wars and Vietnam, whereas in other countries, movies related to wars in other historical periods are considered war movies.

Film genres may appear to be readily categorizable from the setting of the film. Nevertheless, films with the same settings can be very different, due to the use of different themes or moods. For example, while both The Battle of Midway and All Quiet on the Western Front are set in a wartime context and might be classified as belonging to the war film genre, the first examines the themes of honor, sacrifice, and valour, and the second is an anti-war film which emphasizes the pain and horror of war. While there is an argument that film noir movies could be deemed to be set in an urban setting, in cheap hotels and underworld bars, many classic noirs take place mainly in small towns, suburbia, rural areas, or on the open road.

The editors of filmsite.org argue that animation, pornographic film, documentary film, silent film and so on are non-genre-based film categories.

Linda Williams argues that horror, melodrama, and pornography all fall into the category of "body genres" since they are each designed to elicit physical reactions on the part of viewers. Horror is designed to elicit spine-chilling, white-knuckled, eye-bulging terror; melodramas are designed to make viewers cry after seeing the misfortunes of the onscreen characters; and pornography is designed to elicit sexual arousal. This approach can be extended: comedies make people laugh, tear-jerkers make people cry, feel-good films lift people's spirits and inspiration films provide hope for viewers.

Eric R. Williams (no relation to Linda Williams) argues that all narrative feature-length films can be categorized as one of eleven "super genres" (action, crime, fantasy, horror, romance, science fiction, slice of life, sports, thriller, war and Western). Williams contends that labels such as comedy or drama are more broad than the category of super genre, and therefore fall into a category he calls "film type". Similarly, Williams explains that labels such as animation and musical are more specific to storytelling technique and therefore fall into his category of "voice". For example, according to Williams, a film like Blazing Saddles could be categorized as a comedy (type) Western (super-genre) musical (voice), while Anomalisa is a drama (type) Slice of Life (super-genre) animation (voice). Williams has created a seven-tiered categorization for narrative feature films called the Screenwriters Taxonomy.

A genre movie is a film that follows some or all of the conventions of a particular genre, whether or not it was intentional when the movie was produced.

== Film in the context of history ==
In order to understand the creation and context of each film genre, we must look at its popularity in the context of its place in history. For example, the 1970s Blaxploitation films have been called an attempt to "undermine the rise of Afro-American's Black consciousness movement" of that era. In William Park's analysis of film noir, he states that we must view and interpret film for its message with the context of history within our minds; he states that this is how film can truly be understood by its audience. Film genres such as film noir and Western film reflect values of the time period. While film noir combines German expressionist filming strategies with post World War II ideals; Western films focused on the ideal of the early 20th century. Films such as the musical were created as a form of entertainment during the Great Depression allowing its viewers an escape during difficult times.

Over time, a genre can change through stages: the classic genre era; the parody of the classics; the period where filmmakers deny that their films are part of a certain genre; and finally a critique of the entire genre. This pattern can be seen with the Western film. In the earliest, "classic" Westerns, there was a clear hero that protected society from lawless villains who lived in the wilderness and came into civilization to commit crimes. However, in revisionist Westerns of the 1970s, the protagonist becomes an antihero who lives in the wilderness to get away from a civilization that is depicted as corrupt, with the villains now integrated into society. Another example of a genre changing over time is the popularity of the neo-noir films in the early 2000s (Mulholland Drive (2001), The Man Who Wasn't There (2001) and Far from Heaven (2002); these can be seen as film noir parodies, a repetition of noir genre tropes, or a re-examination of the noir genre

This is important to remember for film analysts and film scholars when looking at films in the future. As viewers watch films, they are conscious of societal influence within the film itself. To understand a film's underlying subtext and intentions, analysis is needed of the film's intended target audience and the narrative of the current society, as well as the film's own commentary on the past and present society at the time of the film's making. Such would enable both audiences and film analysts alike to understand the film genre's evolution over time, following both changes in society, historical events, laws, and the state of the wider entertainment industry.

== See also ==
- Film
- Genre fiction
- Genres
- Glossary of motion picture terms
- List of genres
- Literary genre
- Music genre
- Video game genre
