= Western film =

Film genre

The Western is a film genre defined by the American Film Institute as films which are "set in the American West that [embody] the spirit, the struggle, and the demise of the new frontier." Generally set in the American frontier between the California Gold Rush of 1849 and the closing of the frontier in 1890, the genre also includes many examples of stories set in locations outside the frontier – including Northern Mexico, the Northwestern United States, Alaska, and Western Canada – as well as stories that take place before 1849 and after 1890. Western films comprise part of the larger Western genre, which encompasses literature, music, television, and plastic arts.

Western films derive from the Wild West shows that began in the 1870s. Originally referred to as "Wild West dramas", the shortened term "Western" came to describe the genre. Although other Western films were made earlier, The Great Train Robbery (1903) is often considered to mark the beginning of the genre. Westerns were a major genre during the silent era (1894–1929) and continued to grow in popularity during the sound era (post–1929).

The genre reached its pinnacle between 1945 and 1965 when it made up roughly a quarter of studio output. The advent of color and widescreen during this era opened up new possibilities for directors to portray the vastness of the American landscape. This era also produced the genre's most iconic figures, including John Wayne and Randolph Scott, who developed personae that they maintained across most of their films. Director John Ford is often considered one of the genre's greatest filmmakers.

With the proliferation of television in the 1960s, television Westerns began to supersede film Westerns in popularity. By the end of the decade, studios had mostly ceased to make Westerns. Despite their dwindling popularity during this decade, the 1960s gave rise to the revisionist Western, several examples of which became vital entries in the canon.

Since the 1960s, new Western films have only appeared sporadically. Despite their decreased prominence, Western films remain an integral part of American culture and national mythology.

== Characteristics ==
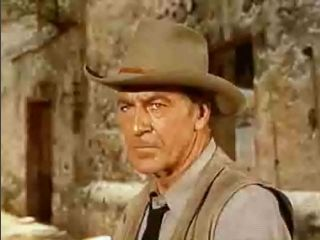
Gary Cooper in Vera Cruz from 1954.

The American Film Institute defines Western films as those "set in the American West that [embody] the spirit, the struggle, and the demise of the new frontier". The term "Western", used to describe a narrative film genre, appears to have originated with a July 1912 article in Motion Picture World magazine.

Most of the characteristics of Western films were part of 19th-century popular Western fiction, and were firmly in place before film became a popular art form. Film critic Philip French has said that the Western is "a commercial formula with rules as fixed and immutable as the Kabuki Theater."

Western films commonly feature protagonists such as sheriffs, cowboys, gunslingers, and bounty hunters, who are often depicted as seminomadic wanderers who wear Stetson hats, bandannas, spurs, and buckskins, use revolvers or rifles as everyday tools of survival and as a means to settle disputes using "frontier justice". Protagonists ride between dusty towns and cattle ranches on their trusty steeds.

== History ==
=== Origins ===
Film Westerns derive from the Wild West shows that began in the 1870s. These shows, which included stage plays and outdoor exhibitions, culminated in Buffalo Bill's Wild West, a touring performance that ran from 1883 to 1913. Wild West shows, which were intended for urban audiences, established many of the elements that came to define Western films, such as the blending of fact and fiction and the romanticization of the frontier. These early films were originally referred to as "Wild West dramas", the term "Western" came to describe the genre. The use of this shortened term appears to have originated with a July 1912 article in Motion Picture World magazine.

The first films that belong to the Western genre are a series of short single reel silents made in 1894 by Edison Studios at their Black Maria studio in West Orange, New Jersey. These featured veterans of Buffalo Bill's Wild West show exhibiting skills acquired by living in the Old West – they included Annie Oakley (shooting) and members of the Sioux (dancing).

=== Silent era ===
Western films were enormously popular in the silent-film era (1894–1927). The earliest known Western narrative film is the British short Kidnapping by Indians, made by Mitchell and Kenyon in Blackburn, England, in 1899. The Great Train Robbery (1903, based on the earlier British film A Daring Daylight Burglary), Edwin S. Porter's film starring Broncho Billy Anderson, is often erroneously cited as the first Western, though George N. Fenin and William K. Everson point out that the "Edison company had played with Western material for several years prior to The Great Train Robbery". Nonetheless, they concur that Porter's film "set the pattern—of crime, pursuit, and retribution—for the Western film as a genre". The film's popularity opened the door for Anderson to become the screen's first Western star; he made several hundred Western film shorts. So popular was the genre that he soon faced competition from Tom Mix and William S. Hart. Jesse James Under the Black Flag (1921) was an early full-length silent feature Western starring Jesse James Jr as his father.

One of the first studios dedicated to the production of Westerns established in 1910 in Los Angeles and was a facility owned by the American branch of the French Pathé group.

=== 1930s ===
With the advent of sound in 1927–28, the major Hollywood studios rapidly abandoned Westerns, leaving the genre to smaller studios and producers. These smaller organizations churned out countless low-budget features and serials in the 1930s. By the late 1930s, the Western film was widely regarded as a "pulp" genre in Hollywood, but its popularity was dramatically revived in 1939 by major studio productions such as Dodge City starring Errol Flynn, Jesse James with Tyrone Power, Union Pacific with Joel McCrea, Destry Rides Again featuring James Stewart and Marlene Dietrich, and especially John Ford's landmark Western adventure Stagecoach starring John Wayne, which became one of the biggest hits of the year. Released through United Artists, Stagecoach made John Wayne a mainstream screen star in the wake of a decade of headlining B Westerns. Wayne had been introduced to the screen 10 years earlier as the leading man in director Raoul Walsh's spectacular widescreen The Big Trail, which failed at the box office in spite of being shot on location across the American West, including the Grand Canyon, Yosemite, and the giant redwoods, due in part to exhibitors' inability to switch over to widescreen during the Great Depression.

=== "Golden Age" ===
After the renewed commercial successes of the Western in the late 1930s, their popularity continued to rise until the 1950s, when the number of Western films produced outnumbered all other genres combined.

The period from 1940 to 1960 has been called the "Golden Age of the Western". It is epitomized by the work of several prominent directors including:

- Robert Aldrich – Apache (1954), Vera Cruz (1954)
- Budd Boetticher – several films with Randolph Scott including The Tall T (1957) and Comanche Station (1960)
- Delmer Daves – Broken Arrow (1950), The Last Wagon (1956), 3:10 to Yuma (1957)
- Walt Disney – Frontierland (theme park), Davy Crockett series (1955), Elfego Baca series (1958), Texas John Slaughter series (1958)
- Allan Dwan – Silver Lode (1954), Cattle Queen of Montana (1954)
- John Ford – Stagecoach (1939), My Darling Clementine (1946), The Searchers (1956), The Man Who Shot Liberty Valance (1962)
- Samuel Fuller – Run of the Arrow (1957), Forty Guns (1957)
- George Roy Hill – Butch Cassidy and the Sundance Kid (1969)
- Howard Hawks – Red River (1948), Rio Bravo (1959), El Dorado (1966)
- Henry King – The Gunfighter (1950), The Bravados (1958)
- Anthony Mann – Winchester '73 (1950), The Man from Laramie (1955), The Tin Star (1957)
- Sam Peckinpah – Ride the High Country (1962), The Wild Bunch (1969)
- Nicholas Ray – Johnny Guitar (1954)
- George Stevens – Annie Oakley (1935), Shane (1953)
- John Sturges – Gunfight at the O.K. Corral (1957), The Magnificent Seven (1960)
- Jacques Tourneur – Canyon Passage (1946), Wichita (1955)
- King Vidor – Duel in the Sun (1946), Man Without a Star (1955)
- William A. Wellman – The Ox-Bow Incident (1943), Yellow Sky (1948)
- William Wyler – The Westerner (1940), The Big Country (1958)
- Fred Zinnemann – High Noon (1952)

=== Revivals ===
There have been several instances of resurgence for the Western genre. According to Netflix, the popularity of the genre is due to its malleability: "As America has evolved, so too have Westerns."

During the 1960s and 1970s, Spaghetti Westerns from Italy became popular worldwide; this was due to the success of Sergio Leone's storytelling method in the Spaghetti Western Dollars Trilogy featuring Clint Eastwood: A Fistful of Dollars (1964), For a Few Dollars More (1965), The Good, the Bad and the Ugly (1966), as well as Once Upon a Time in the West (1968).

Although experiencing waning popularity during the 1980s, the success of films such as Dances with Wolves (1990) and Unforgiven (1992) brought the genre back into the mainstream. Back to the Future Part III (1990) was "a full-blown Western" set in 1885; although the least commercially successful of the trilogy and according to some a departure from the 1985 original (a sci-fi) and the 1989 sequel (an action adventure), Part III has been regarded by others as a fitting end to the series.

At the turn of the 21st century, Westerns have once again seen an ongoing revival in popularity. Largely influenced by the recapturing of Americana mythology, appreciation for the vaquero folklore within Mexican culture and the US Southwest, interest in the Western lifestyle's music and clothing, along with popular video games series such as Red Dead.

== Themes and settings ==
Screenwriter and scholar Eric R. Williams identifies Western films as one of eleven super-genres in his screenwriters' taxonomy, claiming that all feature length narrative films can be classified by these super-genres. The other ten super-genres are action, crime, fantasy, horror, romance, science fiction, slice of life, sports, thriller, and war.

Western films often depict conflicts with Native Americans. While early Eurocentric Westerns frequently portray the Native Americans as dishonorable villains, the later and more culturally neutral Westerns gave Native Americans a more sympathetic treatment. Other recurring themes of Westerns include treks (e.g. The Big Trail) or perilous journeys (e.g. Stagecoach) or groups of bandits terrorizing small towns such as in The Magnificent Seven.

The Western goes beyond simply a cinematic genre, and extends into defining the myth of the West in American culture.

Early Westerns were mostly filmed in the studio, as in other early Hollywood films, but when location shooting became more common from the 1930s, producers of Westerns used desolate corners of Arizona, California, Colorado, Kansas, Montana, Nevada, New Mexico, Oklahoma, Texas, Utah, or Wyoming. These settings gave filmmakers the ability to depict vast plains, looming mountains, and epic canyons. Productions were also filmed on location at movie ranches.

Often, the vast landscape becomes more than a vivid backdrop; it becomes a character in the film. After the early 1950s, various widescreen formats such as Cinemascope (1953) and VistaVision used the expanded width of the screen to display spectacular western landscapes. John Ford's use of Monument Valley as an expressive landscape in his films from Stagecoach to Cheyenne Autumn (1965), "present us with a mythic vision of the plains and deserts of the American West, embodied most memorably in Monument Valley, with its buttes and mesas that tower above the men on horseback, whether they be settlers, soldiers, or Native Americans".

== See also ==
- Westerns on television
- Western fiction
- List of Western subgenres
- Lists of Western films
