= The Triangle of Knowledge =

Concept relevant to storytelling

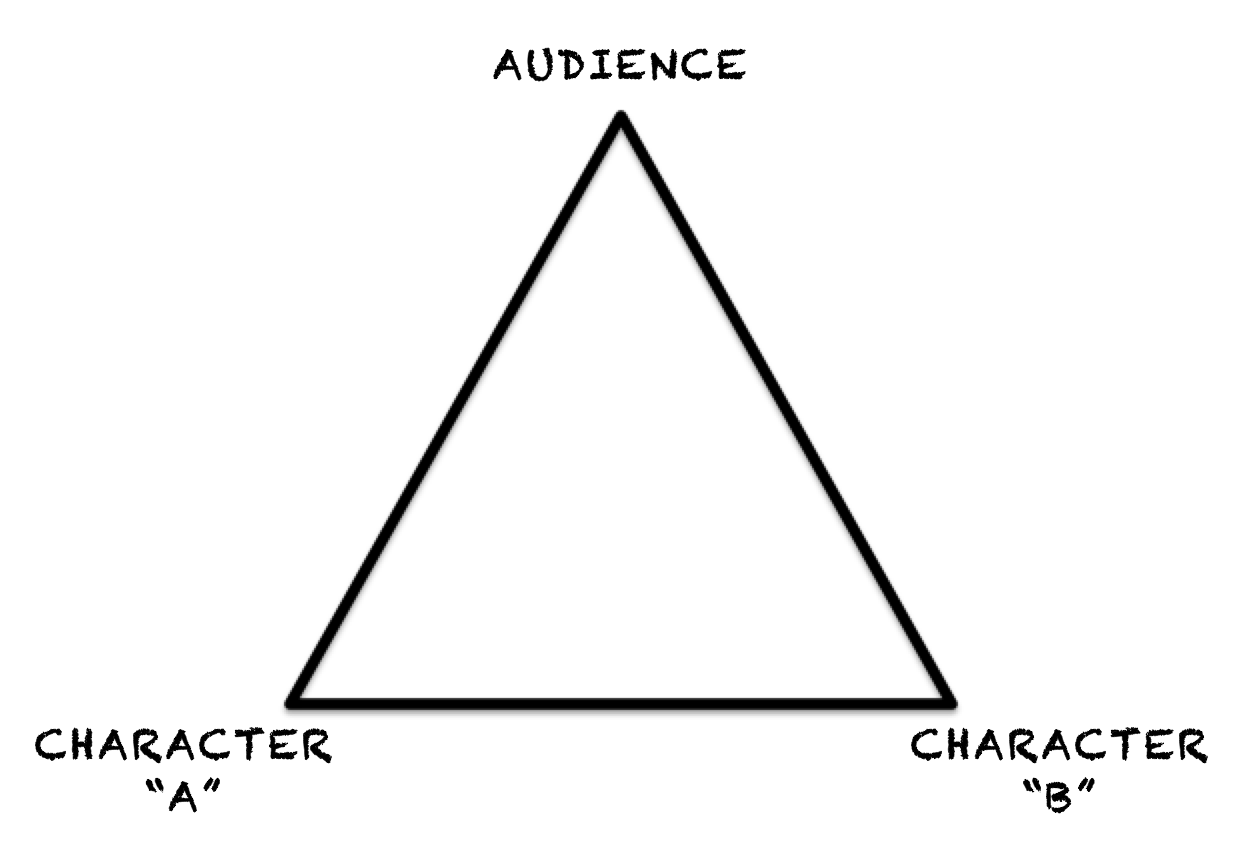
The three minds that have knowledge in a screenplay

The Triangle of Knowledge is a writing technique to create and amplify tension in a screenplay, teleplay or stage play identified by Eric R. Williams. The Triangle represents ‘three minds’ that contain knowledge within a scene: the Protagonist, the audience, and any other Character in the scene. According to Williams, tension is created or enhanced when one of the three corners of the triangle is deprived knowledge (or "kept in the dark") in the scene.

== Option A: Audience in the Dark ==
To create tension, a writer may deprive the audience of information that the two characters in the scene possess. Keeping the audience in the dark is the most common use of the Triangle of Knowledge. It is often used at the beginning of the film.

At the beginning of Leaving Las Vegas, screenwriter/director Mike Figgis keeps the audience in the dark revealing just enough details to make the Protagonist (Ben - Character A) stand out. Ben dons an expensive but worn suit in an elite bar, which leaves the audience curious. then, Ben has an awkward conversation with a second character about borrowing money (Character B). The awkward interaction between Character A and Character B reveals a fractured relationship, which creates curiosity and (therefore) tension in the audience.

== Option B: Protagonist in the Dark ==
Often, the audience and a specific character are aware of all the information in a scene, but the protagonist is left in the dark. When the protagonist is kept in the dark, the audience is immediately invested. This explains why people talk to the screen to warn the Protagonist of impending danger even though the character cannot hear them.

In Butch Cassidy and the Sundance Kid, director William Goldman kept the protagonists in the dark in the final scene. Butch and Sundance engage on trivial banter, unaware that an army is gearing up to attack them. However, the audience knows because Goldman shows the army preparing.

== Option C: Secondary Character in the Dark ==
When the audience feels as smart as the protagonist, there is tension and enjoyment in laughing at the ignorance of secondary characters. When a secondary character is kept in the dark, the audience enjoys watching how characters act upon incomplete information. Tension is created when the audience watches secondary characters make decisions that they know the character will regret because the audience does not have the same emotional connection to secondary characters as they have to the protagonist.

Screenwriter Paul Attanasio used this approach in his screenplay for Donnie Brasco. The movie tells the story of an undercover cop (Brasco) infiltrating the mob through his friendship with gangster Lefty Ruggiero. Through the entire film, the audience knows that Donnie is working undercover, but Lefty is completely unaware. This creates tension in even the most mundane scenes because underneath the routine conversation lies the audience's deep-seated interest in predicting whether Brasco will make his way into the mafia's inner sanctum.

== The Storyteller’s Parallax ==
The Storyteller's Parallax is an amelioration of the Triangle of Knowledge, making the triangle into a pyramid. The fourth element of consideration is the Storyteller herself. By adding a fourth point of consideration, the triangle becomes a three dimensional object. The third dimension creates three different Parallaxes: one which is the Triangle of Knowledge itself, and three others that substitute the storyteller for one of the three points.

- Audience – Protagonist – Character X [The Triangle of Knowledge]
- Audience – Protagonist – Storyteller [Parallax A]
- Audience – Storyteller – Character X [Parallax B]
- Storyteller – Protagonist – Character X [Parallax C]
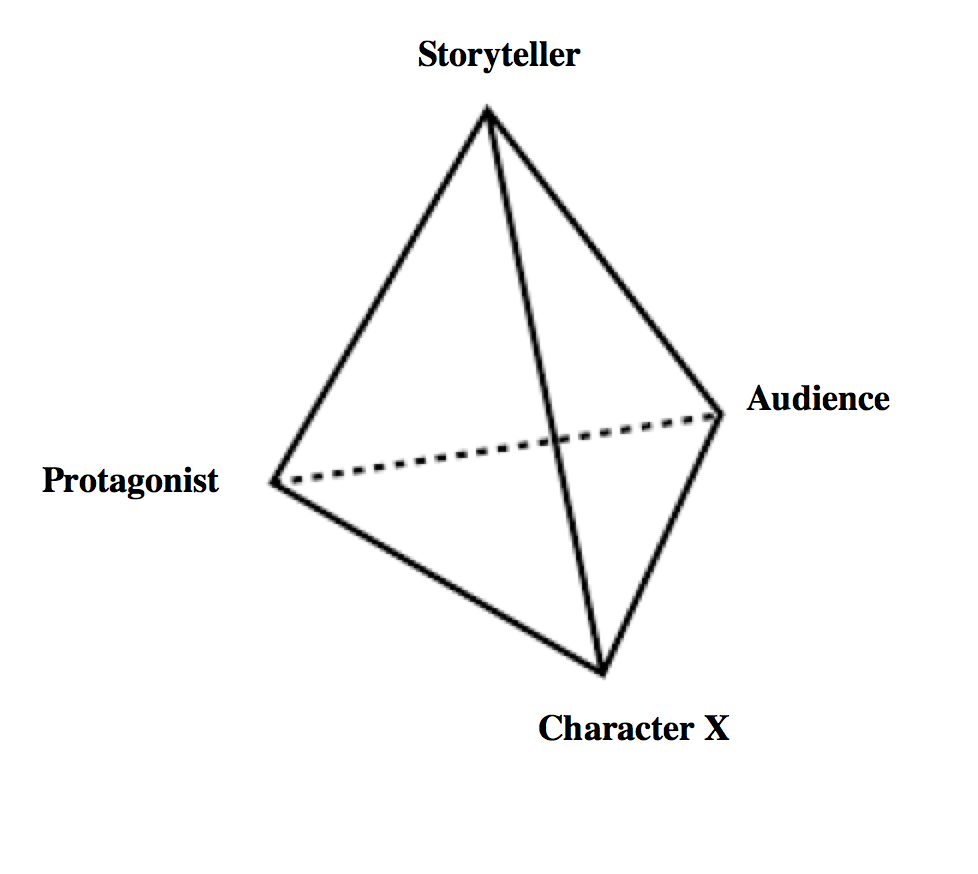
The Storytellers' Parallax

The 2002 psychological thriller Panic Room written by David Koepp and starring Jody Foster illustrates Parallax A. Panic Room is the story of a mother (Meg) and daughter (Sarah) who move to a new house – one with a "panic room" where people can safely hide in case of emergency. Three men break into the house and try to get into the panic room where the two women are hiding. Director David Fincher utilizes the Storyteller's Parallax to create tension by showing one specific shot that reveals to the audience (and the audience only) that Meg's cell phone has fallen under the bed. Meg, on the other hand, believes that the phone is still in its charger and can help her to escape. By making the audience privy to Meg's incorrect assumption, Fincher forces the audience to actively rooting against her plan to retrieve the cell phone from its charger; this creates tension.
