= Thriller film =

Film genre evoking excitement and suspense

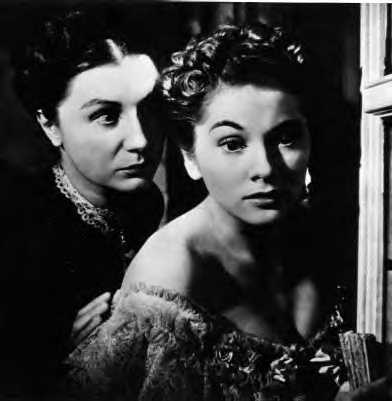
A common theme in thrillers involves innocent victims dealing with deranged adversaries, as seen in Alfred Hitchcock's film Rebecca (1940), where Mrs. Danvers tries to persuade Mrs. De Winter to leap to her death.

Thriller film, also known as suspense film or suspense thriller, is a broad film genre that evokes excitement and suspense in the audience. The suspense element found in most films' plots is particularly exploited by the filmmaker in this genre. Tension is created by delaying what the audience sees as inevitable, and is built through situations that are menacing or where escape seems impossible.

The cover-up of important information from the viewer, and fight and chase scenes are common methods. Life is typically threatened in a thriller film, such as when the protagonist does not realize that they are entering a dangerous situation. Thriller films' characters conflict with each other or with an outside force, which can sometimes be abstract. The protagonist is usually set against a problem, such as an escape, a mission, or a mystery.

Screenwriter and scholar Eric R. Williams identifies thriller films as one of eleven super-genres in his screenwriters' taxonomy, claiming all feature-length narrative films can be classified by these super-genres. The other ten are action, crime, fantasy, horror, romance, science fiction, a slice of life, sports, war, and western. Thriller films are typically hybridized with other super-genres; hybrids commonly include action thrillers, fantasy and science fiction thrillers. Thriller films share a close relationship with horror films, both eliciting tension. In plots about crime, thriller films focus less on the criminal, or the detective, and more on generating suspense. Common themes include terrorism, political conspiracy, pursuit and romantic triangles leading to murder.

In 2001, the American Film Institute (AFI) made its selection of the top 100 greatest American "heart-pounding" and "adrenaline-inducing" films of all time. The 400 nominated films had to be American-made whose thrills have "enlivened and enriched America's film heritage". AFI asked jurors to consider "the total adrenaline-inducing impact of a film's artistry and craft".

== Characteristics ==
In his book on the genre, Martin Rubin stated that the label "thriller" was "highly problematic" declaring that "the very breadth and vagueness of the thriller category understandably discourage efforts to define it precisely." This was echoed by Charles Derry in his book The Suspense Thriller, which found that the terms "suspense thriller", "thriller" and "suspense film" are used continuously in popular press, academic writings and the film industry with no clear agreement of what the definition is. Unlike other genres such as the Western which had recognizable iconography (cowboys, saloons, southwestern landscapes), the thriller lacks such unique iconography. Rubin went on to state that thrillers involve an excess of certain qualities beyond the narratives: they tend emphasize action, suspense and atmosphere and emphasize feelings of "suspense, fright, mystery, exhilaration, excitement, speed, movement" over more sensitive, cerebral, or emotionally heavy feelings. Rubin described thrillers as being both quantitative and qualitative as virtually all narrative films could be considered thrilling to some degree, while they could contain suspense to some degree, but at "a certain hazy point", the films become thrilling enough to be considered part of the genre. For Alfred Hitchcock, a director very associated with the genre, he proclaimed that the whodunnit generated "the kind of curiosity that is void of emotion, and emotion is essential ingredient of suspense" and thus for Hitchcock, "mystery is seldom suspenseful" In their discussions on the political thriller, Pablo Castrillo and Pablo Echart stated in 2015 that the concept of a thriller as an overarching, broad category is "traditionally unclear" due to the varied definitions between authors, with its "boundaries often blurred, overlapped, and hybridized with other genres."

In his book The Suspense Thriller (1988), the genre-studies specialist Charles Derry found the "suspense thriller" to be crime films that lacked a traditional detective figure and featured non-professional criminals or innocent victims as protagonists and excluded films that are often labeled as thrillers such as hard-boiled detective stories, horror films, heist films and spy films. Derry found the non-professional or victim being placed in unfamiliar situations enhanced their vulnerability and thus increased greater suspense. Derry specifically noted the "innocent-on-the-run" theme a coherent in the genre, presenting them in films such as The 39 Steps (1935), North by Northwest (1959) and conspiracy thriller films like The Parallax View (1974) and the comedy-tinged Silver Streak (1976). Alternatively, British communication professor Jerry Palmer in his book Thrillers defined the genre by literary roots, ideology and sociological backgrounds and that thrillers could be reduced to just two components: a hero and a conspiracy. Palmer noted the hero in a thriller must be professional and competitive and not an amateur or an average citizen and suggested and declared characters such as spy James Bond or private eye Mike Hammer to be "quintessential thriller heroes". Palmer also noted that audiences must approve of the hero's actions and adopt their moral perspective. Palmer included styles such as detective films as part of the genre. Rubin argued against Palmer's definition, noting that it would include melodramas and courtroom dramas such as Meet John Doe (1941) into the genre and eliminate such films as Purple Noon (1960) and Psycho (1960) from the genre. Rubin borrowed from G. K. Chesterton's "A Defence of Detective Stories", stating that the world of the thriller is in an urban world, opposed to bygone eras of knights, pirates and cowboys which assists with the concept that "one normally does not think of Westerns as thrillers, even though they often contain a great deal of action, adventures chases and suspense." Similarly, the adventure film is predominantly set in an environment that is already exotic and primitive, and removed form the realm of mundane and modern-day urban existence. In his book Crime Movies: An Illustrated History, Carlos Clarens discussed location being related to thrillers as well, stating that crime films as emphasized broad, socially symbolic characters such as the criminal, the Law, and society while thrillers were more concerned with violence or disturbances within a private sphere.

Rubin declared that thrillers attached itself to other genres such as the spy film, horror film and various sub-genres of crime films more so than Westerns, musicals, and war films. Derry also suggested this, stating that the film was an "umbrella genre" that cuts across several more clearly defined genres. Rubin went as far to suggest that there was possibly no such thing as a pure "thriller thriller" as it was easier to apply it as a quality as a spy thriller, detective thriller, horror thriller, and that there is possibly no such thing as a pure "thriller thriller". Rubin further expanded on the problematic usage of the genre due to its wide usage in media, such as the American magazine TV Guide listing Basket Case (1982) as a thriller, while its sequel Basket Case 2 (1990) was a comedy and that films as diverse as the horror film Halloween (1978), the detective film The Big Sleep (1946), the Harold Lloyd comedy film Safety Last! (1923), the Hitchcock spy film North by Northwest (1959), the disaster film The Poseidon Adventure (1972), and the science fiction monster movie Alien (1979) can all be considered thrillers.

== History ==
=== Precursors ===
==== Pre-film ====
Due to what Rubin describe as a "wide, imprecise scope", it is unwieldy to attempt a comprehensive history of individual genres, including the thriller, and suggests it better to view the style in terms of cycles.

Prior to the development of films, the genre has its connections to broadly-based fiction of the 18th century. Elements of the thriller are traced to the earliest gothic novel with Horace Walpole's The Castle of Otranto (1765) which led to Matthew Lewis's The Monk (1796) and Ann Radcliffe's The Mysteries of Udolpho (1794) and The Italian (1797). Rubin noted that the extended vulnerability of the enthralled protagonists and victims in the thriller anticipated the thriller genre, a statement echoed by Robert D. Hume's 1969 essay which asserts that the Gothic novel involved a reader in a new way, with increased emphasis on suspense, sensation and emotion opposed to moral and intellectual focuses. The gothics being considered thrillers is problematic as they are set in antiquated decaying worlds and fail the tradition of being considered "modern". The second literary form that predated thrillers was the Victorian sensation novel, starting with Wilkie Collins' The Woman in White (1859–1860) which stripped the gothic genre of its mysticism and brought to a contemporary time closer to everyday life. These sensation novels often were published in serialized form, sometimes concluding their installments with cliffhangers called "climax and curtain". The third of the proto-types to the thriller was early detective and mystery fiction, such as Edgar Allan Poe's "The Murders in the Rue Morgue" (1841), which is widely considered the first detective story. The detective story drew upon the previously mentioned forms, and is shown through stories such as the Sherlock Holmes novel The Hound of the Baskervilles.

The roots of the thriller also generally associated with the rise of the urban-industrial society in the 19th century which created new and expanded mass audience, along with new forms of entertainment. This included stage play melodramas such as Uncle Tom's Cabin (1852) in which an escaped slave escapes over an ice-choked river and the rural-set melodrama Blue Jeans (1890) which features a heroine who unties the hero just before he is cut by an advancing buzz saw. Other forms of entertainment arrived in the 19th century at fairgrounds and amusements parks with thrill-oriented rides and attractions such as Ferris wheels, Shoot the Chutes, which Rubin described as offering a "departure from humdrum reality that is merely a heightened version of that same humdrum reality.".

==== Silent era ====
Fairgrounds were the earliest venues for film exhibitions in peep-show arcades, which film historian Tom Gunning described as "the cinema of attractions". Film exhibitions were composed of novelty-oriented shorts that provided surprise, amazement, laughter, or sexual stimulation with no narrative. The sensation of motion in these early films was later input into a framework known as the "chase film" which came into prominence in 1903. The chase films were often produced in Britain and France and employed minimal narrative for an extended chase scene. This genre led to one of the most commercially celebrated American films of the period, The Great Train Robbery (1903). It contained elements of the heist film with its depictions of ingeniously planned robberies, as well as relying on the thriller's technique of accelerated motion. Chase films were limited in scope, but their emphasis on the chase sequence would extend well into the future in films such as On Her Majesty's Secret Service (1969), Vanishing Point (1971), and Speed (1994).

The period between 1907 and 1913 solidified the film industry's increasing mastery of narrative filmmaking, predominantly with D.W. Griffith's films, which Rubin described as "enhancing suspense, psychological depth, and spatial orientation." Griffith applied new techniques such as cross-cutting to build suspense in films such as The Girl and Her Trust (1912), which also supplied psychological context for the actions.

Film serials, featuring stories broken up into regularly scheduled episodes, expanded on the suspense-inducing devices of the earlier chase films. Originally published in newspapers as fictional story installments, the Chicago Tribune came upon the idea in 1913 by running serialized stories in both newspapers and film versions. This led to The Adventures of Kathlyn, a serial in 13 parts which was a grand success and resulted in the newspaper developing the even more successful The Million Dollar Mystery. Serials often ended with cliffhangers, an element that led to the tendency in thrillers to break up the story into a series of self-enclosed set pieces. Film serials were later produced in Europe, with French directors such as Louis Feuillade who went from making chase films to making serials based on novels about master criminals, such as Fantômas (1913) and Les Vampires (1915).

Outside of France, the most significant European venue for serials was Germany, with Fritz Lang writing serials like The Mistress of the World (1919) and later directing films like The Spiders (1919). Lang would make films similar to those of Feuillade, with his films based on Dr. Mabuse that were set in a contemporary time. Lang's Dr. Mabuse the Gambler (1922) was described by Rubin as an important part of the development of the thriller with its "duplicitous, labyrinthine network of decadent nightspots and secret dens that are linked together by murky thoroughfares, twisting back alleys and subterranean passages." Lang's later film Spies (1928) extensively used crosscutting not only to enhance suspense and draw thematic parallels, but also to develop what Rubin described as a "paranoid vision of a world where everything seems to fit together as part of an ever-widening web of conspiracy". This type of editing was later applied to numerous film noirs such as Robert Siodmak's The Killers (1946) and Stanley Kubrick's The Killing (1956). It was also used in Oliver Stone's JFK (1991) and Bryan Singer's The Usual Suspects. During the silent era, German Expressionism was active from 1905 onward. These films featured distorted sets and stylized gestures which had an influence on filmmaking all over the world, including the United States. The expressionist cinematic style was particularly relevant to the thriller, combining psychology and spectacle.

=== 1930s ===
The early 1930s saw the rise of two film genre movements: the gothic styled horror film and the gangster film. Universal Pictures was the leader of the horror genre in the early 1930s with its expressionist-derived atmosphere that started with two big hits film: Dracula (1931) and Frankenstein (1931). Rubin noted that both films lacked the thriller's fundamental tension between the familiar and exotic or adventurous. Also in the early 1930s, the gangster film arrived with early major films including Mervyn LeRoy's Little Caesar (1930), William A. Wellman's The Public Enemy (1931) and Howard Hawks Scarface (1932). These films centered on the rise of and fall of the criminal with Rubin noting that suspense in these films was "relatively slight", with both genres leaving an imprint on subsequent forms of the thriller with mid-1930s G-Man films, the early detective films of the 1940s, and the gangster films of the 1950s. The gangster film itself imbued the modern urban environment with larger-than-life overtones.

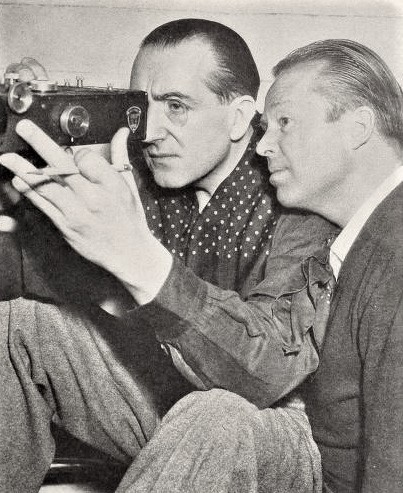
Fritz Lang (on the left) in 1938.

Rubin described the mid-1930s as when the thriller entered its "classical period" with the emergence of key genres that were previously either non-existent or minor. These included the spy film, detective film, the film noir, the police film and the science fiction thriller. The horror films of the early 1930s with their Europeanized settings and villains led to what Rubin described as a "growing uneasiness towards Europe" Such anxieties were directly registered with spy thriller films, that were previously marginalised but grew as the tensions of the 1930s and the outbreak of World War II. The genre grew into popularity in Great Britain in the mid-1930s with the output of the countries leading filmmaker Alfred Hitchcock. Between 1934 and 1938, Hitchcock directed five spy thrillers: The Man Who Knew Too Much (1934), The 39 Steps (1935), Secret Agent (1936), Sabotage (1936), and The Lady Vanishes (1938). Along with Lang's output of the period, Rubin stated that Hitchcock became a "top rank" filmmaker specialising in the classical film thrillers, opposed to his prior output, which only sporadically included films that could be considered thrillers. Compared to Lang, Hitchcock approach to the spy thriller was described by Rubin as "less abstract, less epic" with "a greater emphasis on individual psychology and subjective points of view" while Lang's primary focus was on "the structure of the trap", Hitchcock's was on the "mental state of the entrapped." The first major American spy thriller of the World War II era was Confessions of a Nazi Spy (1939). After relocating to the United States, Hitchcock continued his attachment to spy films with films like Foreign Correspondent (1940) and Saboteur (1942). Despite having these films exist beyond the cityscapes of the thriller genre, they do not deploy the adventure nature of The Adventures of Kathlyn or The Spiders usually lacking in exaggerated methods of transport, such as parachute drops, safaris, submarines, or even high-speed chases.

=== 1940s ===
Like the spy film, another genre that grew popular due to the war-generated phenomena in the early to mid-1940s saw the rise of thrillers centered around various phases of crime films such as the rise in popularity of detective films. These ranged from B-film detectives such as Michael Shayne, The Falcon, Boston Blackie, the Crime Doctor as well as modernized Sherlock Holmes stories having him battle Nazis. These smaller budget films led to more major productions such as John Huston's The Maltese Falcon (1941) while Murder, My Sweet (1944) introduced the character Philip Marlowe to film. Marlowe would appear again in The Big Sleep (1946). These detective films drew upon thriller and thriller-related genres with their nocturnal atmosphere and style influenced by expressionism. They often overlapped with film noir, a style coined by French critics in 1946 which arose in the mid-1940s. The film noir style was not acknowledge by American filmmakers, critics or audiences until the 1970s. Early films considered as harbingers of the movement include Fritz Lang's You Only Live Once (1937), the b-film Stranger on the Third Floor (1940) and I Wake Up Screaming (1941) and the first universally acknowledged major film noir: Billy Wilder's Double Indemnity.

During the 1940s, the influence of other foreign movements such as Italian neo-realism and American filmmaker's participation in making war documentaries and the audience's growing familiarity with these documentaries gritty and fact-based style led to Hollywood developing crime films that were shot in actual locations opposed to studio sets. These films included The House on 92nd Street and Call Northside 777 (1947) and the most acclaimed of these films, The Naked City (1948) which re-created a police manhunt for a brutal killer. These films eventually began toning down their factuality to be applied to more noir styles, such as with Kiss of Death (1947), The Street with No Name (1948), and He Walked by Night (1949). Rubin found that placing these films in actual locations increased the tension of the ordinary world opposed to the limited confines of the studio sets.

Further spy films were made, including The House on 92nd Street began encompassing anti-communist themes. This was inaugurated with films like The Iron Curtain (1948). These titles drew on 1930s gangster film conventions, with the American branch of the communist parties being depicted like a gangster organization. This cycle continued into the 1950s with I Was a Communist for the FBI (1951), The Red Menace (1949), and Samuel Fuller's Pickup on South Street (1953).

=== 1950s ===
Crime was the significant focus of thrillers in the 1950s. The more realistic crime films of the 1940s and film noir merged into films about police detectives thrillers. Unlike the more clean-cut police officers of the 1940s realistic films, these films often had the police officer following darker paths. These included The Man Who Cheated Himself (1951), The Prowler (1951), Pushover (1954). A smaller wave of similar police thrillers had the police detective having moral weakness, but excessiveness. These included Where the Sidewalk Ends (1950), On Dangerous Ground (1952), The Big Heat (1953). Rubin declared Orson Welles' Touch of Evil (1958) as another major film of this flawed-cop style. Rubin found that these late noirs collectively represent a peak of character development and moral complexity in the film thriller that was closer to the psychology films of Alfred Hitchcock than the action or mystery-oriented forms of the police thriller. Syndicate gangster films of the era had similarities to the anti-communist spy films and alien-invasion science fiction films of the era with films like The Enforcer (1951) while The Phenix City Story (1955) and The Brothers Rico which contained borderline breakdowns of the criminal world and the lawful world. The gangsters of these films do not resemble conventional criminals of the past, they dressed casually while being non-confrontational with muted violence.

The 1950s also saw the movement of the science fiction thriller, which previously was a relatively minor genre. The most prevalent was a hybrid of science fiction and horror in films like Them! (1954) and Tarantula (1955) while the films more attuned to the thriller occasionally saw an alien invasion theme, such as in Invasion of the Body Snatchers (1956) which Rubin described as being between "science-fiction mundaneness and film-noir moodiness". The science fiction thrillers of the era are not set on far off planets or but featured in present-day locales such as in It Came from Outer Space and The Incredible Shrinking Man.

The 1950s also launched what Rubin called "a run of Hitchcock masterpieces", following an uneven period of experimentation in the late 1940s. Rubin noted as Hitchcock hitting his stride with Strangers on a Train (1951), Rear Window (1954), Vertigo (1958), North by Northwest (1959) and Psycho (1960). During this period, Anglo-American critics of the era preferred Hitchcock's lighter-hearted British classics of the 1930s, these films were declared as "more ambitious and mature works" by Rubin, which became the focus of a major re-evaluation of Hitchcock's artistic stature, which included with the first full-length books study of his work: Hitchcock (1957), by Éric Rohmer and Claude Chabrol, as well as the first English-language assessment, with Robin Wood's Hitchcock's Films (1965). The plots and themes of these films would be re-worked into later directors such as Jonathan Demme (Last Embrace (1979)), Brian de Palma (Dressed to Kill (1980), Body Double (1984), Obsession (1976)) and Curtis Hanson (The Bedroom Window (1987)).

=== 1960s ===
Around 1960, Rubin described that key thriller categories went through major overhauls. This led to closing what he described as "subversive debunking" that nearly closed the doors on genres like the detective film, re-contextualizing genres like the neo-noir, and enhancing the popularity of some genres such as the spy film briefly and other genres like the police film for longer periods.

The expansion of foreign-film exhibition in the United States of highly regarded thrillers was an influence on the American thriller film. Among the earliest of these was Henri-Georges Clouzot's The Wages of Fear (1953) and Les Diaboliques (1955) and Jules Dassin's Rififi (1955) which influenced the 1960s thrillers with their sordid atmosphere. Another cross-fertilization between American and European thrillers was the French New Wave, a movement which arose in the late 1950s. The style of these films were generally more self-conscious and intrusive than that of Hollywood films. When these films had thriller aspects, these aspects of their story had a throwaway quality. The influence of the French New Wave was seen on American thrillers such as Mickey One (1965), Point Blank (1967) and Bonnie and Clyde (1967), as well as later films (Sisters (1972), Blue Velvet (1986) and Reservoir Dogs (1992)).

The spy film had been what Rubin described as "stagnating" for several years due to the limitations of post-war anti-communist films. The genre was dramatically revitalized by the surprise hit Dr. No (1962), which led to increasingly expensive and lucrative sequels, as well as spearheading a 1960s spy craze in cinema and mass media. Dr. No was conceived as a series of action set pieces (called "bumps" by the series co-producer Albert R. Broccoli) which mixed the film's action and violence with generous doses of humor and Bond's post-bloodshed quips and sexual banter. The Bond films generally distanced themselves with apolitical villains, that toned down the cold war elements of the original novels and spy films of the past, locating their films in Jamaica, Istanbul and Miami over Cuba, Berlin or Israel. Rubin found that the Bond films important to the development of the thriller, but their own thriller dimensions was limited due to the Bond stories gravitating towards adventures, suspense sequences being moderate, and tensions kept simple compared to the films of Hitchcock or Lang. Following the success of the Bond films, the character became the standard which all other spy films of the era were defined by within their similarities or dissimilarities. These included having the spy being suave hero, colorful locations, attractive women and flamboyant decors. Many pre-1970s spy films were predominantly comedies with spy film elements, such as Our Man Flint (1966) and The Silencers (1966) and their sequels. Another style of spy films attempted to differentiate themselves from the Bond films, while still differentiating themselves from the patriotic and Anti-Nazi and anti-communist spy films of the past. These films deglamorized the nature of the Bond films while still remaining thrillers, such as The Ipcress File (1965), Funeral in Berlin (1966), The Defector (1966) and The Quiller Memorandum (1966). These films featured spies who seemed less invincible than James Bond and other super spies, and often featured a more paranoid edge to their plots.

Police thrillers returned to popularity around the period of law-and-order issues between 1968 and 1972 presidential campaigns through a general swing towards the right in the United States due to the Vietnam War. The police-centered were much less critical in their treatment of their justice obsessed lawmen and were showcased fighting to protect society where official institutions have failed them. The police thriller returned in 1967 with the multiple-Oscar winning film In the Heat of the Night (1967), which was more about social issues than being a straight thriller, the films' use of racial epithets and strong-arm methods paved the way for films featuring characters like Dirty Harry and Jimmy "Popeye" Doyle for the upcoming police cycle. Early films in the cycle included Madigan (1968), The Detective (1968), Coogan's Bluff (1968) and Bullitt (1968), the latter being more successful financially than any the previously mentioned thrillers. Like Bond, Bullitt featured much of the mystique as the James Bond series, with his stylish lifestyle and being an elite specialist working with a larger organization and is granted considerable autonomy on the course of his assignments. Bullitt's producer Philip D'Antoni featured even more elaborate variations in his later productions such as The French Connection (1971) and The Seven-Ups (1973) as car chases became staple to modern police thrillers. These police thrillers also featured a harsher more conflict-riddled world closer to those of the anti-Bond spy films. These films were also harsher and more violent, mostly due to the demise of the Hays Code. The influence of the police thriller was long lasting, leading into the popular Die Hard and Lethal Weapon film series and attaching itself to other genres such as science fiction (Mad Max, Blade Runner, RoboCop), and comedy (48 Hrs. and Beverly Hills Cop).

=== 1970s ===
Offshoots of the police thriller is the vigilante film, in which an avenger in an urban setting throws off the restraints of the super cop of the police thrillers to operate as a loner without a badge or uniform. The main characters usually revolve around personal revenge and desire to cleanse society of its evil doers. Examples include the Death Wish film series, Taxi Driver (1976) and Ms. 45 (1981). A cycle of action films featuring black leads that came from the police thriller, vigilante films, and blaxploitation films arrived with the 1970s. The films predominantly feature loose-cannon private eyes such as in Shaft (1971), Slaughter (1972) and Coffy (1973) or hustlers such as in Super Fly (1972) and The Mack (1973). The films were often derivations of earlier films such as Cool Breeze (1972), a remake of The Asphalt Jungle, Hit Man (1972) a remake of Get Carter (1971), and Black Mama, White Mama (1973) a remake of The Defiant Ones (1958). The cycle generally slowed down by the mid 1970s.

During the 1970s, contemporary situations such as the Watergate scandal and disillusionment about the Vietnam War led to conspiracy thrillers. A cycle of these films included Executive Action (1973) about the assassination of President John F. Kennedy, The Parallax View (1974) about a sinister corporation linked to a series of political murders, and others like The Conversation (1974) and Winter Kills (1979). Unlike other films of the past, the paranoia of these films often focused on American institutions opposed to gangsterism or communists.

A thriller-related movement in the 1970s was the disaster film, which came with the great financial success of Airport (1970), about an airplane crippled by a bomb that struggles to land in a snowstorm. Similar films about a group of survivors escape several locations, such as The Poseidon Adventure (1972), The Towering Inferno (1974) and Earthquake (1974) about a group of troubled people in Los Angeles. The films often featured all-star casts and often had the disaster happening early or mid-way into the story rather than at the climax with the narrative focusing on the group of survivors. The genre ended following overt sequels, television films and parodies. The genre had a brief revival in the late 1990s through the science-fiction and disaster hybrid Independence Day (1996), which was followed by Dante's Peak (1997), Volcano (1997) and Titanic (1997).

=== 1990s to present ===
In the early 1990s, thrillers had recurring elements of obsession and trapped protagonists who must find a way to escape the clutches of the villain—these devices influenced a number of thrillers in the following years. Rob Reiner's Misery (1990), based on a book by Stephen King, featured Kathy Bates as an unbalanced fan who terrorizes an incapacitated author (James Caan) who is in her care. Other films include Curtis Hanson's The Hand That Rocks the Cradle (1992) and Unlawful Entry (1992), starring Ray Liotta.

Detectives/FBI agents hunting down a serial killer was another popular motif in the 1990s. A famous example is Jonathan Demme's Best Picture–winning crime thriller The Silence of the Lambs (1991)—in which young FBI agent Clarice Starling (Jodie Foster) engages in a psychological conflict with a cannibalistic psychiatrist named Hannibal Lecter (Anthony Hopkins) while tracking down serial killer Buffalo Bill—and David Fincher's crime thriller Seven (1995), about the search for a serial killer who re-enacts the seven deadly sins.

Another notable example is Martin Scorsese's neo-noir psychological thriller Shutter Island (2010), in which a U.S. Marshal must investigate a psychiatric facility after one of the patients inexplicably disappears.

In recent years, thrillers have often overlapped with the horror genre, having more gore/sadistic violence, brutality, terror and frightening scenes. The recent films in which this has occurred include Disturbia (2007), Eden Lake (2008), The Last House on the Left (2009), P2 (2007), Captivity (2007), Vacancy (2007), and A Quiet Place (2018). Action scenes have also gotten more elaborate in the thriller genre. Films such as Unknown (2011), Hostage (2005), and Cellular (2004) have crossed over into the action genre.

== Sub-genres ==
The thriller film genre includes the following sub-genres:

=== Action thriller ===
Action thriller is a blend of both action and thriller film in which the protagonist confronts dangerous adversaries, obstacles, or situations which he/she must conquer, normally in an action setting. Action thrillers usually feature a race against the clock, weapons and explosions, frequent violence, and a clear antagonist. Examples include, Face/Off, Hard Boiled, Dirty Harry, Taken, The Fugitive, Snakes on a Plane, Speed, The Dark Knight, The Hurt Locker, The Terminator, The Equalizer, the Die Hard series and the Bourne series.

=== Action comedy thriller ===
Action comedy thrillers combine well-choreographed fight or chase scenes, high-stakes drama, and moments of laughter. Such films include Bullet Train, Grosse Pointe Blank, Knight and Day, the Lethal Weapon franchise, Midnight Run, Novocaine, One Battle After Another and the Rush Hour franchise.

=== Comedy thriller ===
Comedy thriller is a genre that combines elements of humor with suspense. Such films include Silver Streak, Dr. Strangelove, Charade, Hera Pheri, Malamaal Weekly, Kiss Kiss Bang Bang, In Bruges, Mr. & Mrs. Smith, The Thin Man, The Big Fix, Pocket Listing, The Lady Vanishes and Game Night.

=== Conspiracy thriller ===
Conspiracy thriller is a genre in which the hero/heroine confronts a large, powerful group of enemies whose true extent only she/he recognizes. The Chancellor Manuscript and The Aquitaine Progression by Robert Ludlum fall into this category, as do films such as Awake, Snake Eyes, The Da Vinci Code, Edge of Darkness, Absolute Power, Marathon Man, In the Line of Fire, Capricorn One and JFK.

=== Crime thriller ===
Crime thriller as a genre is a hybrid type of both crime films and thrillers, which offers a suspenseful account of a successful or failed crime or crimes. Such films often focus on the criminal(s) rather than a policeman. Central topics include serial killers/murders, robberies, chases, shootouts, heists and double-crosses. Some examples of crime thrillers involving murderers are Seven, No Country for Old Men, The French Connection, The Silence of the Lambs, Memento, To Live and Die in L.A., Collateral and Copycat. Examples of crime thrillers involving heists or robberies are The Asphalt Jungle, The Score, Rififi, Entrapment, Heat and The Killing.

=== Erotic thriller ===
Erotic thriller is a thriller film that has an emphasis on eroticism and where a sexual relationship plays an important role in the plot. It has become popular since the 1980s and the rise of VCR market penetration. The genre includes such films as Body Heat, Sea of Love, Basic Instinct, Chloe, The Fourth Man (1983 film), Disclosure, Dressed to Kill, Eyes Wide Shut, In the Cut, Lust, Caution and Single White Female.

=== Giallo ===
Giallo is an Italian thriller film that contains elements of mystery, crime fiction, slasher, psychological thriller, and psychological horror. It deals with an unknown killer murdering people, with the protagonist having to find out who the killer is. The genre was popular during the late 1960s-late 1970s and is still being produced today, albeit less commonly. Examples include The Girl Who Knew Too Much, Blood and Black Lace, Deep Red, The Red Queen Kills Seven Times, Don't Torture a Duckling, Tenebrae, Opera and Sleepless.

=== Horror thriller ===
A subgenre involving horror.

=== Legal thriller ===
Legal thriller is a suspense film in which the major characters are lawyers and their employees. The system of justice itself is always a major part of these works, at times almost functioning as one of the characters. Examples include The Pelican Brief, Presumed Innocent, A Time to Kill, The Client, The Lincoln Lawyer and The Firm.

=== Political thriller ===
Political thriller is a type of film in which the protagonist must ensure the stability of the government. The success of Seven Days in May (1962) by Fletcher Knebel, The Day of the Jackal (1971) by Frederick Forsyth and The Manchurian Candidate (1959) by Richard Condon established this sub-genre. Other examples include Topaz, Notorious, The Man Who Knew Too Much, The Interpreter, Proof of Life, State of Play and The Ghost Writer.

=== Psychological thriller ===
Psychological thriller film is a psychological type of film (until the often violent resolution), the conflict between the main characters is mental and emotional rather than physical. Characters, either by accident or their own curiousness, are dragged into a dangerous conflict or situation that they are not prepared to resolve. To overcome their brutish enemies characters are reliant not on physical strength but on their mental resources. This subgenre usually has elements of drama, as there is an in-depth development of realistic characters who must deal with emotional struggles. The Alfred Hitchcock films Suspicion, Shadow of a Doubt, Rear Window and Strangers on a Train, as well as David Lynch's bizarre and influential Blue Velvet, are notable examples of the type, as are The Talented Mr. Ripley, The Machinist, Shutter Island, Mirrors, Insomnia, The Fourth Man (1983 film), Identity, Gone Girl, Red Eye, Phone Booth, Fatal Attraction, The River Wild, Panic Room, Misery, The Hitcher (1986 film), Cape Fear, 10 Cloverfield Lane and Funny Games.

=== Social thriller ===
Social thriller are a thriller that uses suspense to augment attention to abuses of power and instances of oppression in society. This new sub-genre gained notoriety in 2017 with the release of Get Out. Other examples include The Tall Man, Dirty Pretty Things, Parasite and The Constant Gardener.

=== Spy film ===
Spy film is a genre in which the protagonist is generally a government agent who must take violent action against agents of a rival government or (in recent years) terrorists. The sub-genre often deals with the subject of espionage in a realistic way (as in the adaptations of John Le Carré's novels). It is a significant aspect of British cinema, with leading British directors such as Alfred Hitchcock and Carol Reed making notable contributions, and many films set in the British Secret Service. Thrillers within this sub-genre include Berlin Express, Spy Game, Hanna, Traitor, Tinker Tailor Soldier Spy, The Tourist, The Parallax View, The Tailor of Panama, Mission Impossible, Unknown, The Recruit, the James Bond franchise, The Debt, The Good Shepherd and Three Days of the Condor.

=== Supernatural thriller ===
Supernatural thriller films include an otherworldly element (such as fantasy or the supernatural) mixed with tension, suspense or plot twists. Sometimes the protagonist or villain has some psychic ability and superpowers. Examples include Fallen, Frequency, In Dreams, Flatliners, The Skeleton Key, What Lies Beneath, Unbreakable, The Sixth Sense, The Gift, The Dead Zone and Horns.

=== Techno-thriller ===
Techno-thriller is a suspenseful film in which the manipulation of sophisticated technology plays a prominent part. Examples include WarGames, The Thirteenth Floor, I, Robot, Source Code, Eagle Eye, Supernova, Hackers, The Net, Futureworld, eXistenZ and Virtuosity.
