= Screenwriters Taxonomy =

System for categorizing screenplays

Inspired by the biological classification system of the Linnaean taxonomy, screenwriter Eric R. Williams developed the Screenwriters Taxonomy in 2017 to create a common language of creative collaboration for filmmakers. Williams’ central thesis in The Screenwriters Taxonomy: A Roadmap to Collaborative Storytelling is that the term “genre” is used so broadly to describe films that the modern use of the word has become meaningless. The Screenwriter's Taxonomy proposes seven categories for discussing the creative process of telling cinematic stories.

1. Type
2. Super Genre
3. Macrogenres
4. Microgenres
5. Voice
6. Pathway
7. Point of View

Combined, this approach creates more than 185 million creative permutations.

== Type ==
In the broadest sense, all narrative fiction films can be broken down into two types: Comedy or Drama. The difference between types is simply whether or not the film is more serious (drama) or humorous (comedy). There are ten different brands of drama, and a dozen brands of comedy.

BRAND OF DRAMA	DESCRIPTION	FILM EXAMPLES
Dark Drama	Dramas dealing with intensely serious issues.	· Oldboy · Requiem for a Dream
Docudrama	Dramatized adaptation of real-life events. While not always completely accurate, the general facts are more-or-less true.	· Into the Wild · Zodiac
Docu-fiction	Different from docudramas, docu-fictional films combine documentary and fiction, where actual footage or real events are intermingled with recreated scenes.	· Interior Leather Bar · Your Name Here
Dramedy	A serious story that contains some characters or scenes inherently humorous to the audience.	· Everything Must Go · Hustlers
Hyper-drama	Coined by film professor Ken Dancyger, these stories exaggerate characters and situations to the point of becoming fable, legend or fairy tale.	· Fantastic Mr. Fox · Maleficent
Light Drama	Light-hearted stories that are, nevertheless, serious in nature.	· The Help · The Terminal
Satire	Satire can involve humor, but the result is typically sharp social commentary that is anything but funny. Satire often uses irony or exaggeration to expose faults in society or individuals that influence social ideology.	· Birdman · Dr. Strangelove
Straight Drama	This broad category applies to those that do not attempt a specific approach to drama but, rather, consider drama as a lack of comedic techniques.	· The 39 Steps · Ghost World
Tragedy	Stories that explore human suffering, and end in devastation.	· Million Dollar Baby · Fruitvale Station
Tragicomedy	A story that explores human suffering, but with an uplifting ending and/or with enough comedic elements to keep the audience laughing throughout the tragic story.	· 50/50 · Man on the Moon · Moonrise Kingdom

BRAND OF COMEDY	DESCRIPTION	FILM EXAMPLES
Bathroom Comedy	Comedy that is indecent, often about sex, bodily functions and containing a healthy dose of profanity.	· Animal House · Dumb and Dumber
Comedy of Ideas	Uses comedy to explore serious ideas such as religion, sex or politics. Often the characters represent particular divergent worldviews and are forced to interact for comedic effect and social commentary.	· M*A*S*H · The Player
Comedy of Manners	Emphasizes verbal gymnastics above all else, utilizing clever insults and witticisms to entertain.	· The Graduate · Under the Tuscan Sun
Dark Comedy	Humor that makes light of subject matter typically considered taboo.	· American Psycho · Deadpool
Farce	Exaggerating situations beyond the realm of possibility – thereby making them entertaining.	· In the Loop · Some Like it Hot
Observational Comedy	Finding humor in the common practices of everyday life.	· Carnage · Fast Food Nation
Parody (or Spoof)	Humor based on imitation. All parodies are based on a pre-existing work that is widely recognized by the intended audience. The work is summarily exaggerated to the point of mockery and trivialization.	· Hot Fuzz · Young Frankenstein
Sex Comedy	Humor that is primarily derived from sexual situations and desire.	· Don Jon · Knocked Up
Situational Comedy	Humor that comes from knowing a stock group of characters (or character types) and then exposing them to different situations to create humorous and ironic juxtaposition.	· Galaxy Quest · The Princess Bride
Straight Comedy	This broad category applies to those that do not attempt a specific approach to comedy but, rather, used comedy for comedic sake.	· Clueless · Mrs. Doubtfire
Slapstick Comedy	Humor that uses tripping, falling, and cartoon-like violence as the core element.	· The General · The Three Stooges
Surreal Comedy	Storytelling that includes behavior and storytelling techniques that are illogical; includes bizarre juxtapositions, absurd situations and unpredictable reactions to normal situation.	· Monty Python and the Holy Grail · Swiss Army Man

== Super Genre ==
The Screenwriters Taxonomy classifies eleven“Super Genres”. Super genres are defined by three elements (each consisting of specific components):

- Character (consisting of the types of central characters, those characters’ goals, and stock characters that support the story)
- Story (consisting of central themes, the rhythm of how the story is told and the classic tent pole scenes that the audience expects)
- Atmosphere (consisting of locations, costumes, props and visceral experiences for the audience)

The eleven super genres are:

1. Action
2. Crime
3. Fantasy
4. Horror
5. Life
6. Romance
7. Science Fiction
8. Sports
9. Thriller
10. War
11. Western

The super genre “Life” is further divided into:

- Day in the Life (where the main character's daily struggles are the central conflict in the story)
- Slice of Life (stories focused on how community copes with every day issues).

Screenwriters working in these super genres support this category as foundational to the other categories.

== Macro Genres ==
While there are a limited number of super genres, there are at least fifty macro genres. A macro genre contains interchangeable elements that pair with super genres to create a more detailed story. By pairing a macro genre with a super genre, more specific expectations emerge within a story. For example, “Time Travel” is a macro genre. It can be paired with a variety of super genres to create a time travel fantasy story, or a time travel romance. Multiple macro genres can be used for a single story. The fifty macro genres identified in the Screenwriters Taxonomy are:

EXAMPLE OF 50 MACRO GENRES
1. Addiction; 2. Adventure; 3. Alien Invasion; 4. Apocalyptic; 5. Artificial Intelligence; 6. Biography; 7. Bro- / Wo- mance; 8. Demonic; 9. Disaster; 10. Disease / Disability	11. Epic / Saga; 12. Erotica; 13. Escape; 14. Family; 15. Gangs / Punks / Brothers in Arms; 16. Gangster; 17. Ghost / Spirits / Angels; 18. Heist / Caper; 19. Historical; 20. Holiday	21. Identity; 22. Killing; 23. Law Enforcement; 24. Legal; 25. Love; 26. Magical; 27. Martial Arts; 28. Medical; 29. Military; 30. Mission	31. Monster; 32. Mystery / Detective; 33. Political; 34. Procedural; 35. Protection; 36. Psychological; 37. Religious; 38. Revenge/Justice; 39. Romantic Comedy; 40. Science Fantasy	41. School Films; 42. Showbiz / Artistry; 43. Slasher; 44. Spy / Espionage; 45. Superhero; 46. Super Powers; 47. Survival; 48. Terror; 49. Time Travel; 50. Workplace

Each of the eleven super genres can be used as macro genres (e.g. science fiction and fantasy)

An example of how the “mystery” macro genre would pair with each super genre:

- The Usual Suspects is a crime mystery
- Who Framed Roger Rabbit is a fantasy mystery
- The Blair Witch Project is a horror mystery
- The Hangover is a slice of life mystery
- Vertigo is a romance mystery
- Minority Report is a science fiction mystery
- Eight Men Out is a sports mystery
- The Silence of the Lambs is a thriller mystery
- The Manchurian Candidate is a war mystery
- The Hateful Eight is a western mystery

Screenwriters often identify as writing specifically for a macro-genre (e.g. romantic comedy) with the understanding that they are working within a broader super genre.

== Micro Genres ==
Macro genres can be paired randomly with any given super genre. Micro genres work differently. Each micro genre is particular to a given macro genre – providing even more specificity and nuance to the story, characters and atmosphere. Therefore, each macro genre has its own set of possible micro genres. For example, the “biography” macro genre has at least six possible micro genres:

1. Biography of the rich and/or famous (The Social Network or Malcolm X)
2. Biography of an entertainer or athlete (Ray or Cinderella Man)
3. Biography of a politician (The King's Speech)
4. Biography of an unknown person doing something remarkable (Schindler's List)
5. Biography of a group or organization (Remember the Titans)
6. Biography of a newsworthy or historical event (Apollo 13 or The Imitation Game)

The micro genres for each macro are as follows:

EXAMPLE OF FIFTY MACRO GENRES AND THEIR MICRO GENRES
Macro	Micros
Addiction	Actions, Alcohol, Drugs, Gambling
Adventure	Battle, Exploration, Piracy, Quest, Rebellion, Space
Alien Invasion	Earth-centric, First Contact, Space-centric
Apocalyptic	Actively within, Post-apocalyptic, Pre-apocalyptic
Artificial Intelligence	Androids, Cyborgs, Robots
Biography	Entertainment, Everyman, Group/Organization, Political, Newsworthy, Temporal, Rich and Famous
Bro- or Wo- mance	Stronger Bond, Traditional, Tragedy,
Demonic	Devil / Occult, Possession, Witchcraft
Disaster	Global, Local, Personal
Disease/Disability	Personal, Societal
Epic/Saga	Discovery / Exploration, Event-specific, Historical, Person-specific
Erotica	Fetish, Mainstream
Escape	Impossible, Non-Prison, Tale, Traditional
Family Drama	Family Bond, Family Feud, Family Loss, Family Rift
Gangs/Punks/Brothers in Arms	Interest-specific (biker, surfer), Ideology-specific (punk rock, politics), Location-specific (neighborhood, school)
Gangster	Anti-hero pov, Authority pov
Ghost/Spirits/Hauntings/Angels	Across the Divide, Emotional, Mystic, Reincarnation, Traditional
Heist/Caper	Impossible, Procedural, Tale
Historical	Alternate, Modern, Period
Holiday	Event, Family, Origin
Identity	Gender/Sexuality, Humanity, Loss of..., Racial, Religious
Killing	Serial, Slasher, Stalker, Unintended, Reflection
Law Enforcement	Community, Personal crime, Process and Life of..., Rescue, True Crime, Undercover/Vice
Legal	Courtroom, Investigation, Tales of the System, Underdog / Whistleblower
Love	Traditional, In disguise, Nonconventional, Obsession, Unrequited
Magical	Locational, Vocational, Wonderment
Martial Arts	Form (Karate, Kung Fu, Mixed), Philosophy (Ninja, Samurai)
Medical	Biography, Non-Hospital, Seemingly Impossible, Tale
Military	Biographical, Historical, Mission, Tale
Mission	Impossible, Tale
Monster	Alien, Creature, Mutant, Mythic (Mummy, Vampire, Werewolf, Zombie, etc.), Scientific, Swarms
Mystery/Detective	Crime specific (murder, theft, kidnapping, etc.), Hard boiled, Pulp, Whodunit
Political	Contemporary, Historical, International, Local, National
Procedural	Artistic, Investigative, Legal, Medical, Political, Scientific
Protection	Babysitter, Bodyguard, Family/Loved Ones, Legal
Psychological	Conspiracy, Evil, Mistaken Identity, What if? Worst Case
Religious	Biographical, Religious Text, Spirituality
Revenge/Justice	Legal, Psychological, Settle a Score, Vigilante
Romantic Comedy	Adult, Child, Non-conventional, Remarriage, Teen
Science Fantasy	Discovery, Dying Earth, ET Relations, Mad Scientist, Space Opera, Sword & Planet
School Films	College, Elementary, High School, Specific School (law, culinary, medical, etc.)
Showbiz/Artistry	Biography, Culture, Creative Process
Slasher	Splatter, Survival, Teen
Spy/Espionage	Corporate, Military, Political, Secrets (sports, school, etc.)
Superhero	Origin Story, Personal Battles, Save the World
Super Powers	Intelligence, Life extension, Mental, Physical
Survival	Captivity, Experiences (abuse, training, disaster, etc.), Nature/Outdoor, Rescue
Terror	Man-made, Natural, AI / ET encounter, Paranormal, Stalker, Survival
Time Travel	Discovered, Exists, Secret Invention
Workplace	Boss’ story, What it's like, Worker's story

== Voice ==
“Voice” does not address the genre traits of story, characters and atmosphere. Instead, voice concentrates on how the story is told. A traditional Hollywood story is told:

1. as a linear narrative
2. made using modern filmmaking techniques
3. written for a broad audience
4. with live-action, human characters
5. that speak their dialogue
6. as oblivious participants in the screenwriter's story.

According to the Screenwriters Taxonomy, within this definition of how a Hollywood story is told, six questions can influence the screenwriter's voice:

1. Will the story be told linearly, or will there be an alternative voice that uses:

- Flashbacks (e.g.: Slumdog Millionaire)
- Intercut time periods (e.g.: The Hours)
- Parallel realities (e.g.: Atonement)
- Repetition (e.g.: Groundhog Day)
- Time travel (e.g.: 12 Monkeys)
- Reverse chronology (e.g.: Memento)

2. Should the filmmaker expect to use modern filmmaking techniques, or will there be an alternative voice such as using:

- Black and white film (e.g.: Raging Bull)
- Silent film techniques (e.g.: Gravity)
- Longer takes (e.g.: Gerry)
- Few camera moves (e.g.: The New World)

3. Is the story being written for a broad audience, or will there be an alternative audience addressed with this voice, for example:

- Adult audience (e.g.: 9 ½ Weeks)
- Child audience (e.g.: Clifford the Big Red Dog)
- LGBTQ audience (e.g.: Blue is the Warmest Colour)
- Minority audience (e.g.: Barber Shop)
- Female audience (e.g.: Little Women)
- Religious audience (e.g.: Killing Jesus)

4. Will the story be presented with live action, human actors or will there be an alternative voice that uses techniques such as:

- Stop Motion Animation (e.g.: Fantastic Mr. Fox)
- Live Action Puppets (e.g.: The Muppet Movie)
- 2D or 3D Animation (e.g.: Big Hero 6)

5. Will the characters speak their dialogue, or will there be a different approach to communicating, for instance:

- Musicals (e.g.: Hamilton)
- Silence (e.g.: The Artist)
- Voice Over (e.g.: Goodfellas)

6. Are the fictional characters oblivious that a film is being made, or will there be an alternative technique in play, for example:

- Breaking the fourth wall (e.g.: Fight Club)
- Mock-u-mentary approach (e.g.: Borat)
- Internal Monologues (e.g.: A Clockwork Orange)

== Pathway ==
Pathways describe the trajectory of how the audience will move through the story. Regardless of genre, each story sends their protagonist(s) along a specific trajectory (or pathway). The pathway becomes a subconscious roadmap for the audience – a tool to guide them through the story. There are twenty different pathways, including the traditional pathway with which American audiences are most familiar. The traditional pathway has five elements:

1. A single protagonist goes through a change.
2. The audience and protagonist generally learn information at the same time.
3. The protagonist follows the Hero's Journey.
4. The central pay-off for the audience is the protagonist battling an antagonist character.
5. In the end, our hero is victorious and is rewarded.

These five elements take an audience through a film in a familiar way. As an example, in the 1991 Academy Award Winning film Silence of the Lambs, the audience joins Clarice Starling on her metamorphosis from fledgling to experienced FBI agent. They go through the story with her. What she learns, they learn. She starts in the world of law enforcement, makes her way into the world of the criminally insane, and eventually returns, victorious, to her home at the FBI. The visceral pay-off for the audience comes from her mental battle with Dr. Lecter and Buffalo Bill. In the end, Agent Starling is rewarded for the battle that she waged.

In addition to the traditional pathway, there are nineteen others:

NON-TRADITIONAL PATHWAYS
1. Buddy Movie; 2. Chase/Hunt; 3. Coming of Age; 4. Fish out of Water; 5. Gang Falls Apart; 6. Lost Innocence	7. Human vs. Nature; 8. Human vs. Self; 9. Human vs. Society; 10. Human vs. Technology; 11. Melodrama; 12. Noir	13. Rags to Riches to Rags; 14. Reunion Films; 15. Reunite the Gang; 16. Road Movie; 17. Screwball Comedy; 18. Tale of Madness; 19. Unlikely Ensemble

These nineteen pathways diverge from the traditional pathway in one of seven ways:

=== #1: Defeated Underdog ===
The protagonist may battle an antagonist, but the more important struggle is often against some larger force. The audience's enjoyment comes from watching this larger force destroy the protagonist. In this pathway, the protagonist is typically destroyed. Or, if he survives, the survival itself is the victory. Rarely does the protagonist “come out on top”.

Pathways in this category:

- Noir
- Tale of Madness
- Rags to Riches to Rags

=== #2: Defeated Underdog + Subverted Journeys ===
The protagonist may confront an antagonist, but the central focus is watching the protagonist endure an extreme personal tragedy. The protagonist is often destroyed emotionally, and rarely “comes out on top”. Additionally, in this pathway, the hero's attention to personal tragedy diverts them from their original heroic journey.

Pathway in this category:

- Melodrama

=== #3: Subverted Journeys ===
The protagonist rarely returns home – literally or metaphorically.

Pathways in this category:

- Chase/Hunt
- Road Movie

=== #4: Multiple Protagonists ===
These Pathways to not use a single protagonist to carry the story. Instead, they split the story equally across multiple protagonists. Each story is shorter because each character has a full story with their own beginning, middle and end. Protagonists may or may not confront an antagonist. If they do, the antagonist is often a broad, two-dimensional character. The audience is more engaged in the emotional relationship between the various protagonists than they are in external conflicts.

Pathways in this category:

- Buddy Movie
- Screwball Comedy
- Reuniting the Gang
- Unlikely Ensemble

=== #5: Multiple Protagonists + Unknowing Audience ===
These pathways do not use a single protagonist to carry the story. Instead, they split the story equally across multiple protagonists. Protagonists may or may not confront a specific antagonist. Often the story revolves around an event that the group must endure, or a mission that the group must accomplish. Each character serves as the antagonist in their colleague's story. What sets this pathway apart from the simple “Multi-Protagonist” pathway is how the backstory is provided to the audience. In this pathway, the audience is perpetually playing “catch up”. The protagonists know each other, and have known each other for some time. However, the audience joins the characters’ story already in progress.

Pathways in this category:

- Reunion Films
- Gang Falls Apart

=== #6: All-Knowing Audience ===
In these pathways, the audience knows more than the protagonist. The audience doesn't learn information as much as they remember information. Enjoyment comes from reminiscence, and the central pay-off comes from watching the protagonist go through an awakening, not from battling a powerful antagonist.

Pathways in this category:

- Coming of Age
- Lost Innocence

=== #7: Non-Character Antagonists ===
In most stories, the protagonist battles an antagonist: another flesh-and-blood sentient being. These pathways diverge from this expectation by telling stories of a protagonist's battle against something non-sentient. These are stories of circumstance, where the “antagonist” does not set out to willfully engage and destroy the protagonist. Yet, the protagonist's life or livelihood is in danger, nonetheless.

Pathways in this category:

- Fish Out of Water
- Human vs. Nature
- Human vs. Self
- Human vs. Society
- Human vs. Technology

Ken Dancyger notes that this sort of multilayer approach to storytelling provides nearly infinite possibilities for the screenwriter.

== Point of View ==
From the outset of any story, the screenwriter must decide how much information the audience will have. Point of View (POV) as a decision tree with three central questions.

1. Will the storyteller limit what the audience can see, or will storyteller allow them to be omniscient?
2. Will the story be told from a primary or secondary character's perspective?
3. Is this story being told objectively, or is there a subjective element to the events?

By finding the answers that best help to tell their story, screenwriters determine a POV for their screenplay. The Screenwriters Taxonomy boils the answers to these questions down into the five most common POVs:

=== Filmmaker Omniscient ===
The characters are unaware that a film is being made, and so have no narrative voice. Instead, the filmmaker crafts a story by taking us on an omniscient tour of characters and events, designed to intrigue and entertain the audience by showing the perfect piece of the story at the most impactful time. This type of filmmaking is usually objective, since the very nature of watching a movie is predicated on the filmmaking being truthful.

=== Primary Omniscient ===
The story is viewed through the main character's perspective. The story is often biased, and the actions told in retrospect – in order to tell the “bigger story” in which the primary character has been caught. Alan Ball used this technique in his final draft of American Beauty.

=== Primary Limited ===
A greater sense of objectivity is created when the protagonist's POV is limited. Although the story is told from a single person's subjective interpretation of events, this POV may seem more authentic and objective in certain situation.

=== Secondary Limited ===
Secondary limited is unusual, but not out of the question. In fact, some of the most famous stories of all time – like the tales of Sherlock Holmes – are told from a secondary, limited perspective. Of course, the story is about the primary character (Sherlock Holmes), but it is told from the perspective of a secondary character (Dr. Watson). Sir Arthur Conan Doyle, as the author, reveals only what Watson would logically know or be able to infer about how Sherlock Holmes solved the crime.

=== Secondary Omniscient ===
Secondary omniscient is even more unusual, and typically occurs when the character is reflecting back on her life or has some sort of special power that causes omniscience. The Coen Brothers used this POV in No Country for Old Men, with sheriff Bell reflecting back on a particular case.

== Case Studies ==
As with the Linnaean taxonomy, Williams claims that each “narrative Hollywood film” utilizes each category: type, super genre, macro genre, micro genre, voice, pathway, and point of view. Each category further defines the film and allows for more specific discussion, analysis and/or creative decision making.

An example of eight films and their categorization according to the Screenwriters Taxonomy:

CASE STUDIES OF EIGHT FILMS USING THE SCREENWRITERS TAXONOMY
	12 Years a Slave	Argo	Shrek	Butch Cassidy & the Sundance Kid	Imitation Game	Casablanca	The Godfather	The Godfather II
Type	Drama Docudrama	Drama Docudrama	Comedy Satire	Drama Light drama	Drama Docudrama	Drama Hyper-drama	Drama Dark drama	Drama Tragedy
Super Genre	Day in the life	Thriller	Fantasy	Western + Crime	Crime	Action	Crime	Crime
Macro: Micro Genres	Biography: Historical Survival: Captivity	Historical: Modern Mission: Tale	Adventure: Quest Bro-mance: Traditional Love: Non-traditional	Historical: Period Bro-mance: Stronger bond Epic: Events	Biography: Historical Workplace: Worker story Military: Historical	Love: Traditional Workplace: Company story Identity: Loss of...	Historical: Period Gangster: Anti-hero Family: Family bond	Historical: Period Gangster: Anti-hero Family: Rift
Voice	Traditional voice except written for an adult audience.	Traditional voice except written for an adult audience.	An animated film filled with modern pop music that helps guide the story.	Traditional Voice that occasionally uses sepia tones, title cards and photographs to remind us of its historic nature.	Non-linear narrative	Non-linear narrative.	Traditional voice except that it is written for an adult audience.	A non-linear narrative written for an adult audience.
Pathway	Fish out of water	Unlikely ensemble	Buddy movie	Buddy movie Chase/hunt	Unlikely ensemble Lost innocence Man vs. society Man vs. technology	Noir Reunion films Man vs. self	Lost innocence	Coming of age
POV	Primary limited	Filmmaker omniscient	Filmmaker omniscient	Filmmaker omniscient	Faux Primary omniscient Filmmaker omniscience	Filmmaker omniscience	Filmmaker omniscient	Filmmaker omniscient
