= Eric R. Williams =

American screenwriter

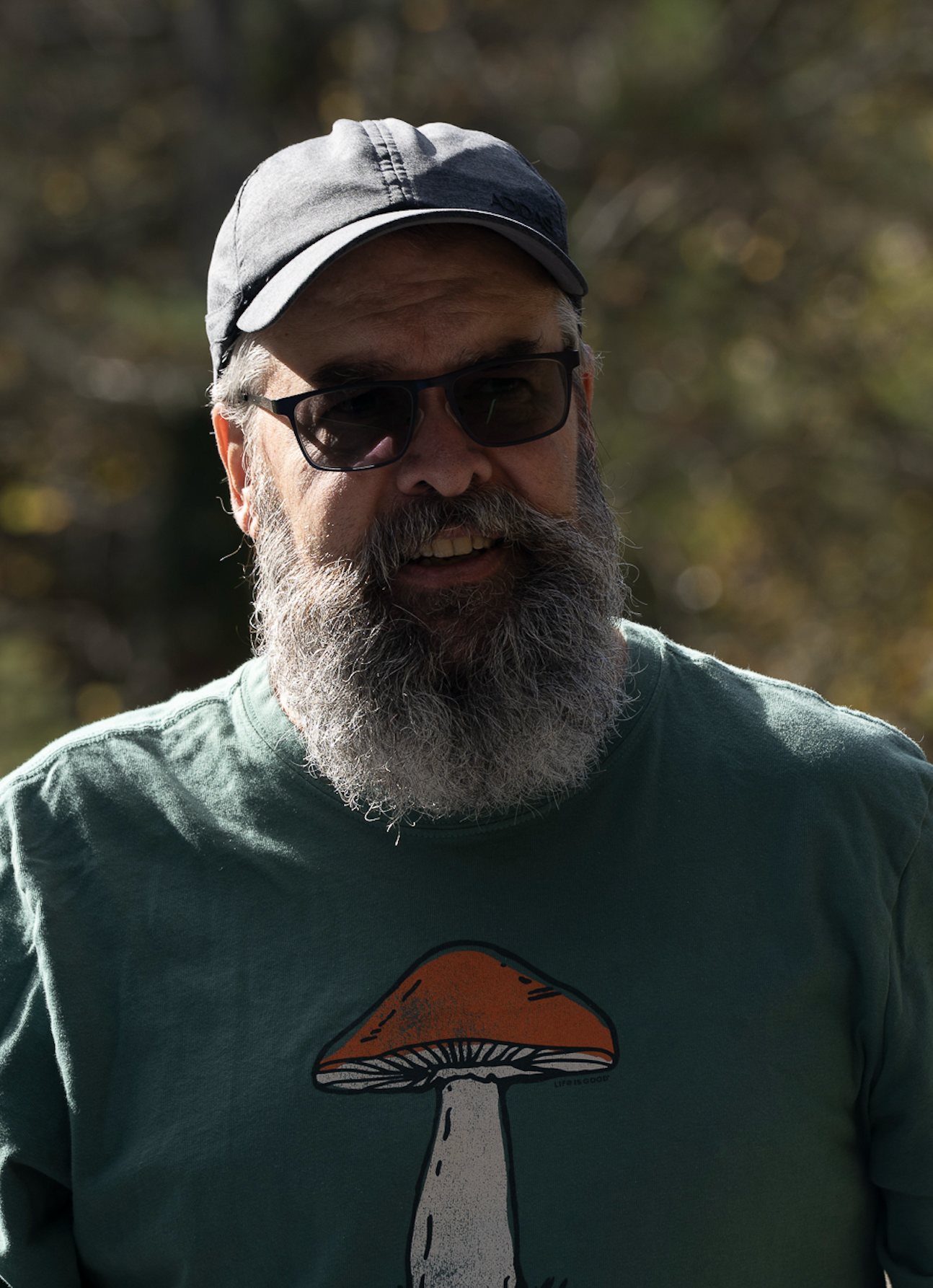
- Williams in Flagstaff Arizona, 2021
- Education: Columbia University
- Occupations: Screenwriter, professor and new media storyteller
- Employer: Ohio University
- Notable work: Screenwriters Taxonomy (book); Imagining Tomorrow’s Entertainment (series)
- Television: Imagining Tomorrow’s Entertainment, How to Appreciate Great Movies, Breaking News: the Collision of Journalism and Consumerism in a Democracy
- Awards: Writers Guild of America Best New Work Emmy Award for Interactive Media FBI National Academy Science and Innovation Award
- Website: williamsonstory.com

Eric R. Williams is an American screenwriter, professor, cinematic virtual reality director, and new media storyteller. He is known for developing alternative narrative and documentary techniques that take advantage of digital technologies.

Williams's narrative research emphasizes collaboration between storytellers and their audience. While teaching at Ohio University, Williams began combining aspects of traditional film, theater, and literature with emerging communication technologies such as virtual reality and 360-degree video. In 2020, he and his colleagues wrote a book explaining their techniques, naming this new medium "virtual reality cinema" (or cine-VR).

He developed the film classification system called the Screenwriters Taxonomy.

== Early life ==
Williams graduated from Northwestern University in 1990 with a bachelor's degree in radio/television/film and a minor in education. He earned his MFA in film from Columbia University, directing the feature film Snakes and Arrows as his thesis. Williams chose Columbia so that he could study writing and producing from James Schamus, Richard Brick, David Shaber and Terry Southern.

== Career ==
=== Film and television ===
Williams' first feature film, Snakes and Arrows, opened the door for him to meet Peter Falk, who hired him to write a Columbo made-for-TV murder mystery for Universal Pictures / Universal Studios in 1998. He later developed and co-produced a pilot for American Movie Classics called Don't Try This At Home.

In the 2000s, Williams worked as a freelance screenwriter and was often hired to write adaptations. Notably, he adapted Luis Alberto Urrea's anthology Across the Wire in 2003; Bill Littlefield's novel The Prospect in 2005; and the anthology Voices from the Heartland in 2008. Williams' work on Voices received the "Ohio Arts Council Award of Individual Excellence in Screenwriting" in 2009. These scripts are shared as examples in his book Screen Adaptation: Beyond the Basics.

By 2010, Williams co-directed and co-produced two documentary television series (Redefining Appalachia and Guyana Pepperpot) as well as the documentary Breaking News (featuring Dianne Rehm, Walter Cronkite and Terry Anderson).

Over the course of ten years as a professor, Williams developed three unique concepts for film and television, publishing two books on the topics:

1. Screenwriters taxonomy
2. Kortlander-Williams Theme Matrix
3. Triangle of knowledge

=== Academic career ===
After working as a screenwriter, director and producer for eight years, Williams joined the faculty of Ohio University's Scripps College of Communication in 2005. In addition to a variety of domestic media projects, Williams used his faculty position to work on international media projects in Ukraine, Guyana and Ecuador.

Williams currently develops virtual reality cinema techniques at Ohio University's Game Research and Immersive Design (GRID) Lab, where he continues to collaborate on a wide variety of non-fiction and narrative-based projects.

In 2022, Williams collaborated with visual journalist, and graphic designer Adonis Durado, to create the award-winning interactive story Dating Forward. The following year, he wrote and hosted the television series Imagining Tomorrow’s Entertainment interviewing emerging media artists across the country. Each episode was based at the GRID Lab and started with a discussion of Williams’ various immersive media projects and collaborators. The show was runner up for the prestigious World Congress of Science and Factual Producers’ award for “Most Innovative Factual Project of the Year”.

Imagining Tomorrow’s Entertainment
Episode	Title	Topic	Guest(s)
1	Down the Rabbit Hole	Immersive Storytelling	Stephanie Riggs
2	Billion Dollar Industry	Esports	Alyssa "Allycxt" Parker
3	Audience Becomes Director	Interactive Filmmaking	Sandeep Parikh Paul Raschid
4	Through the Looking Glass	Cinematic Virtual Reality	Espii Proctor Jordan Herron
5	The Spacetime Continuum	Digital Physicality	Jessie Schell Tyler Blust
6	Metatools for a Metaverse	Immersive Content Creation	Elena Piech Christina Heller
7	Bridging the Phygital Divide	Augmented Reality	Aiman Akhtar Lorne Svarc
8	Digital Doors of Perception	Cyberdelics	Joakim Vindenes
9	Rebooting Athletics	Mixed Reality	Chris Olimpo
10	Curiouser New Ways	Extended Realities	Ethan Shaftel

In 2025, Williams began working as a writer for video games, helping to create the online RPG “Centauri: Bloomtar Region”, the virtual reality detective game “CSI: The Red House”, and the satirical mixed reality game “Operation Big Missile”. At the same time, his work in cine-VR expanded from law enforcement into the public sphere. The GRID Lab collaborated with the Voinovich Academy for Excellence in Public Service to create OHIO360 – an immersive media production facility dedicated to developing high-quality, immersive soft-skill VR experiences to train public service professionals working on the challenging frontlines of safety, security, and health care. Their first clients were the Forensic Nursing Network, human resources training, and the Ohio Department of Health.

== Cinematic virtual reality ==
Williams began writing, directing and producing virtual reality experiences at Ohio University's Game Research and Immersive Design Lab in 2016. Williams' first narrative virtual reality project was Re:Disappearing, which he wrote and directed that same year.

In collaboration with cinematographer/editor Matt Love and producer/director Carrie Love, Williams developed 360-degree video into a new medium called they deemed cinematic virtual reality (or cine-VR, for short). They used cine-VR techniques on the Medicaid Educational Simulation Project. Their cine-VR approach was said to improve cultural self-efficacy in healthcare providers. After three years of research at Ohio University's Game Research and Immersive Design Lab, Williams and the Loves subsequently wrote the book Virtual Reality Cinema: Narrative Tips and Techniques identifying at least four new concepts for telling stories using cine-VR:

1. Persona Gap
2. Story Engagement Matrix
3. Directorial Control vs Audience Agency
4. Blocking, Framing and Editing unique to cine-VR

The authors explain that cine-VR synthesizes concepts from film, theater, literature, virtual reality and video games. Between 2020 and 2021, Williams wrote and/or directed more than half a dozen cine-VR pieces using these techniques, including For the Love of God and Lost Broken Alone. The latter was a finalist for "Best Use of Sound & Music in XR" at the 2020 Real World XR Awards. Music for the piece was provided by Moby; Jordan Herron was the immersive sound designer. In 2021, For the Love of God won the "Best Virtual Reality Award" in the New York Nil Gallery International Media Festival and "First Place: Outstanding Virtual Reality Film" in the Short Sweet Film Festival.

Williams co-developed the concept of "PRE-ality" (a portmanteau of "prepare" and "reality") while working with emergency room doctors and physical therapists, with whom he worked in Columbus, Ohio and San Francisco, California to implement a training experience for medical students. Williams furthered this research in collaboration with Dr. Petra Williams, Northern Arizona University professor of Physical Therapy, and subsequently introduced the concept of PRE-ality at the Virtual Reality and Healthcare Symposium in Washington, D.C. in 2017.

PRE-ality uses virtual reality cinema to evoke a sense of déjà vu in the viewer to better prepare them for a reality they have yet to experience. This discovery led to the implementation of a virtual reality training experience for healthcare education.

== Works ==
Williams authored three books: Virtual Reality Cinema (Routledge, 2021 with Matt and Carrie Love), Screen Adaptation (Focal Press, 2017), and The Screenwriters Taxonomy (Routledge, 2017), and edited two others, The Power of Virtual Reality Cinema for Healthcare Training (Routledge, 2021, with John Bowditch) and Media and the Creative Process (Cognella, 2014, with Beth Novak). Williams also wrote and directed for a variety of traditional and new media platforms:

=== Cine-VR ===
1. What Happened on Peach Tree Ridge? (FNN, 2026) – co-writer / director
2. Armed Man on Oberlin Way (OPOTA, 2026) – co-writer / director
3. Death in D-Block (OPOTA, 2026) – co-writer / director
4. Isolated Incident on Sunset Trail? (OPOTA, 2026) – co-writer / director
5. Six Stops around Latona (OPOTA, 2026) – co-writer / director
6. Tragedy at Home (OPOTA, 2026) – co-writer / director
7. From Buddy to Boss (OHIO 360, 2025) – co-writer / director
8. Choices on the One Bus (OPOTA, 2025) – co-writer / director
9. Fireworks on Oak Street (OPOTA, 2025) – co-writer / director
10. Knock & Talk at the Red House (OPOTA, 2025) – co-writer / director
11. Protest at City Hall (OPOTA, 2025) – co-writer / director
12. Stolen Vehicle on Route 16 (OPOTA, 2025) – co-writer / director
13. Traffic Stop at Butcher Street Storage (OPOTA, 2025) – co-writer / director
14. Jumper on High Plains Bridge (OPOTA, 2024) – co-writer / director
15. Oak Street: Domestic in Progress (OPOTA, 2024) – co-writer / director
16. Pink Slip Issued on Runway Drive (OPOTA, 2024) – co-writer / director
17. Shots Fired at CW High (OPOTA, 2024) – co-writer / director
18. Thieves in Harding Park (OPOTA, 2024) – co-writer / director
19. Wild Bill's Brawl in Indian Hills (OPOTA, 2024) – co-writer / director
20. The Chet Story (GRID Lab, 2021) – writer / director
21. The Dion Story (GRID Lab, 2021) – writer / director
22. For the Love of God (GRID Lab, 2021) – director
23. He Loves Me (not) (GRID Lab, 2021) – director
24. Moving in Moving On (GRID Lab, 2021) – director
25. Diabetes in Appalachia (GRID Lab, 2020) – co-writer / co-director
26. Living with Addiction (GRID Lab, 2020) – co-writer / associate producer
27. Lost Broken Alone (GRID Lab, 2020) – writer / director
28. Re: Disappearing (GRID Lab, 2016) – writer / director

=== Film and television ===
1. Imagining Tomorrow's Entertainment (Wondrium, 2023) – head writer / host
2. Guyana Pepperpot (Blue Arm Productions, 2010) – series producer / segment director
3. Breaking News (Blue Arm Productions, 2009) – writer / director
4. Redefining Appalachia (WOUB-TV, 2009) – series producer
5. Don't Try This at Home [TV pilot] (American Movie Classics, 2002) – creator / co-producer
6. Colombo and the Curse of Sorcery Circus [un-produced] (Universal Studios, 1998) – writer
7. Snakes & Arrows (Blue Arm Productions, 1996) – co-writer / director

=== Audio Series ===
1. TV's New Golden Age (Audible Original, 2021) – writer / host
2. How to Appreciate Great Movies (Audible, 2020) – writer / host
3. Falling in Love with Romance Films (Audible Original, 2019) – writer / host
4. How to View and Appreciate Great Movies (Great Courses, 2018) – writer / host

=== Video Games ===
1. Operation Big Missile (GRID Lab, 2026) – co-writer
2. CSI: The Red House (OHIO 360, 2026) co-writer
3. Centauri: The Bloomtar Region (GRID Lab, 2025) – co-writer / co-producer

=== Books ===
1. The Power of Virtual Reality Cinema for Healthcare Training (Routledge, 2021)
2. Virtual Reality Cinema: Tips and Techniques (Routledge, 2021)
3. Screen Adaptation (Focal Press, 2017)
4. The Screenwriters Taxonomy (Routledge, 2017)
5. Media and the Creative Process (Cognella, 2014)

== Awards ==
=== Award Nominations and Results ===
Year	Nominating Organization	Award	Project	Role	Result
2024	Urban Media Makers Film Festival	Best Virtual Reality Training	Police Dispatch	Writer/director	Winner
2023	World Congress of Science and Factual Producers	Most Innovative Factual Project of the Year	Imagining Tomorrow’s Entertainment	Writer/host	Finalist
2023	FBI National Academy	Science and Innovation Award	ALEI Cine-VR Series	Writer/director	Winner
2022	Graphic Design USA	Best-of-Year Award Winner	Dating Forward	Co-producer	Winner
2022	Academy of Interactive and Visual Arts	Davey Award for Interactive Film	Dating Forward	Co-producer	Silver
2021	New York International Media Festival	Best Virtual Reality Award	For the Love of God	Writer/director	Winner
2021	Short Sweet Film Festival	Outstanding Virtual Reality Film	For the Love of God	Writer/director	Winner
2020	Real World XR Awards	Best Use of Sound & Music in XR	Lost Broken Alone	Writer/director	Finalist
2009	Ohio Arts Council	Award of Individual Excellence in Screenwriting	Voices From the Heartland	Screenwriter	Winner
2008	National Academy of Television Arts & Sciences	Emmy Award for Interactive Media (regional)	What’s the Problem?	Head writer, co-director	Winner
2000	Writers’ Guild of America	Best New Work Award	Crystal Messiah	Screenwriter	Winner
