= W. J. Watt & Co. =

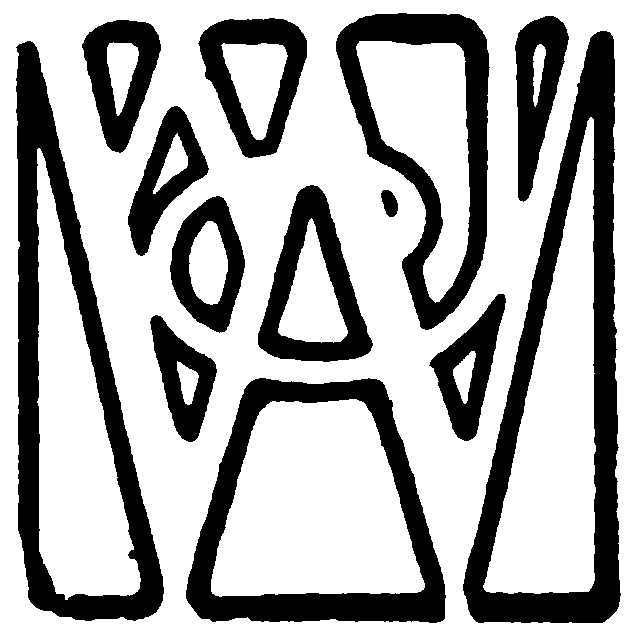
Logo

W. J. Watt & Co. was a publisher in New York. It published about a dozen novels a year from 1908 to 1925, with some emphasis upon Westerns and mysteries.

It published several books by Pearl Doles Bell. It published the novel The Little Nugget by P. G. Wodehouse in New York and his The Intrusion of Jimmy and The Prince and Betty. It copyrighted Destiny by Charles Neville Buck. It also published one of George Bronson Howard's novels about detective Yorke Norroy.

The company's agents included W. J. Watt, Howard Watt, and W. W. Wachob.

== Bibliography ==
- The Last Woman (1909) by Ross Beeckman, W. J. Watt and Company, New York, frontispiece with tissue guard by Howard Chandler Christy and 2 black and white illustrations by Bert Knight
- The Intrusion of Jimmy (May 1910) by P. G. Wodehouse
- The Wilderness Trail (1913) by Francis William Sullivan W. J. Watt & Company New York
- The Little Nugget (1914), a novel by P. G. Wodehouse
- The Heart of the Blue Ridge by Waldron Baily, W.J. Watt and Co., New York City (1915), illustrated by Douglas Duer
- Silver Sandals (1916) by Clinton H. Stagg, W. J. Watt & Company, New York
- Ostrander, Isabel (1917). The Clue in the Air: A Detective Story. W. J. Watt & Co.
- The Single Track (1919) by Douglas Grant
- The Twenty-Six Clues (1919) by Isabel Ostrander
- The Valley of Content by Blanche Upright
