= Argosy (magazine) =

American magazine

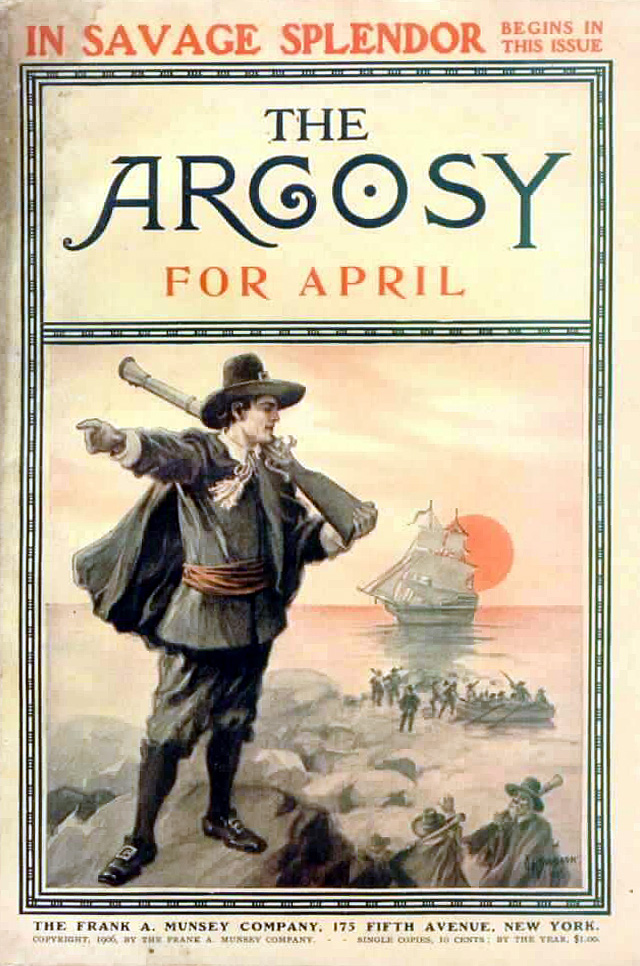
- Cover of the April 1906 issue
- Founder: Frank Munsey
- Founded: 1882
- Final issue: 2016

Argosy was an American magazine, founded in 1882 as The Golden Argosy, a children's weekly, edited by Frank Munsey and published by E. G. Rideout. Munsey took over as publisher when Rideout went bankrupt in 1883, and after many struggles made the magazine profitable. He shortened the title to The Argosy in 1888 and targeted an audience of men and boys with adventure stories. In 1894 he switched it to a monthly schedule and in 1896 he eliminated all non-fiction and started using cheap pulp paper, making it the first pulp magazine. Circulation had reached half a million by 1907, and remained strong until the 1930s. The name was changed to Argosy All-Story Weekly in 1920 after the magazine merged with All-Story Weekly, another Munsey pulp, and from 1929 it became just Argosy.

In 1925 Munsey died, and the publisher, the Frank A. Munsey Company, was purchased by William Dewart, who had worked for Munsey. By 1942, circulation had fallen to no more than 50,000, and after a failed effort to revive the magazine by including sensational non-fiction, it was sold that year to Popular Publications, another pulp magazine publisher. Popular converted it from pulp to slick format, and initially attempted to make it a fiction-only magazine, but gave up on this within a year. Instead, it became a men's magazine, carrying fiction and feature articles aimed at men. Circulation soared and by the early 1950s was well over one million.

Early contributors included Horatio Alger, Oliver Optic, and G. A. Henty. During the pulp era, many famous writers appeared in Argosy, including O. Henry, James Branch Cabell, Albert Payson Terhune, Edgar Rice Burroughs, Erle Stanley Gardner, Zane Grey, Robert E. Howard, and Max Brand. Argosy was regarded as one of the most prestigious publications in the pulp market, along with Blue Book, Adventure and Short Stories. After the transition to slick format, it continued to publish fiction, including science fiction by Robert Heinlein, Arthur Clarke, and Ray Bradbury. From 1948 to 1958 it published a series by Gardner called "The Court of Last Resort" which examined the cases of dozens of convicts who maintained their innocence, and succeeded in overturning many of the convictions. NBC adapted the series for television in 1957.

Popular sold Argosy to David Geller in 1972, and in 1978 Geller sold it to the Filipacchi Group, which closed it at the end of the year. The magazine has been revived several times, most recently in 2016.

== Publication history ==
=== The Golden Argosy ===
In the late 1870s, Frank Munsey was working in Augusta, Maine, as the manager of the local Western Union office. He helped a friend get a job at a publisher in Augusta, and after a couple of years, his friend moved to New York City to work for another publishing company. Munsey was becoming more familiar with the publishing industry during this time, and decided he wanted to launch a magazine of his own. He had some difficulty in getting anyone to agree to invest, but eventually persuaded a stockbroker he knew to put in $2,500 ($83,000 in 2025), of which $500 was a loan to Munsey. Munsey invested $500 of his own, and his friend in New York City added another $1,000, making a total of $4,000 ($133,000 in 2025) in capital. Munsey resigned from Western Union, and moved to New York on September 23, 1882, bringing with him manuscripts he had bought for the magazine before leaving Augusta.

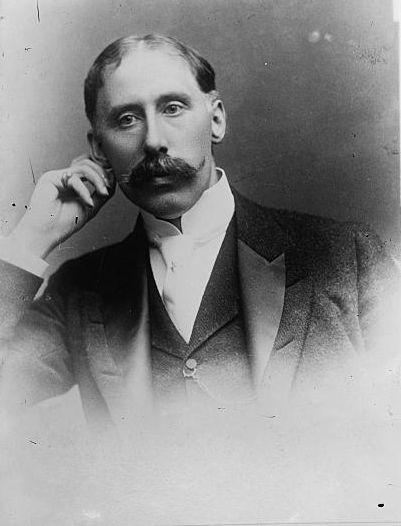
Frank Munsey

Once in New York, Munsey quickly realized that the cost estimates he had made, based on what he had been able to learn while in Maine, were unrealistically low. His original plan for the magazine had been to make it a close copy of Golden Days, a weekly paper for children published in Philadelphia by James Elverson, and to include lithographed covers and internal illustrations. He abandoned these ideas and came up with a simplified approach, still based on Golden Days, that he believed could be made profitable. He wrote to the stockbroker who had promised $2,500 to get the funds sent to him, but received no reply, and since this made it impossible to start the magazine as planned, Munsey released his New York friend from his promise of investment. This left Munsey with only about $40 ($1,330 in 2025), along with the manuscripts he had in hand, which had cost over $500 to acquire. He began looking for a publisher who would back the new magazine, and eventually persuaded E. G. Rideout to take it on. The first issue, titled The Golden Argosy, with Munsey as editor and manager, was dated December 9, 1882; it was eight pages long and cost five cents ($1.67 in 2025). Subscribers were offered a set of colored chromolithographs along with their subscription.

Five months later, Rideout went bankrupt. Munsey had not drawn all his salary, and Rideout had borrowed money from him as well, so he was owed about $1,000 ($35,000 in 2025) by the bankrupt company. He claimed the magazine's title and subscription list in return for his debt, succeeding over a competing claim from a publisher who would have merged the magazine's subscriptions into those of his own publication. The first issue with Munsey as publisher was dated September 8, 1883. Munsey again was reduced to a few dollars, but he was able to borrow $300 ($10,400 in 2025) from Oscar Holway, a banker in Augusta who was a friend. At about this time he bought some stories from Malcolm Douglas, but when Douglas came to collect his payment Munsey offered him the job of editor, at $10 ($300 in 2025) per week, in lieu of payment for the stories. Douglas accepted.

Issue data for The Golden Argosy and The Argosy up to 1894
		January	February	March	April	May	June	July	August	September	October	November	December
1882	Dates:												9,16,23,30
1882	Volume:												1/1 to 1/4
1882	Issue:												1 to 4
1883	Dates:	6,13,20,27	3,10,17,24	3,10,17,24,31	7,14,21,28	5,12,19,26	2,9,16,23,30	7,14,21,28	4,11,18,25	1,8,15,22,29	6,13,20,27	3,10,17,24	1,8,15,22,29
1883	Volume:	1/5 to 1/8	1/9 to 1/12	1/13 to 1/17	1/18 to 1/21	1/22 to 1/25	1/26 to 1/30	1/31 to 1/34	1/35 to 1/38	1/39 to 1/43	1/44 to 1/47	1/48 to 1/51	1/52, 2/1 to 2/4
1883	Issue:	5 to 8	9 to 12	13 to 17	18 to 21	22 to 25	26 to 30	31 to 34	35 to 38	39 to 43	44 to 47	48 to 51	52 to 56
1884	Dates:	5,12,19,26	2,9,26,23	1,8,25,22,29	5,12,19,26	3,10,17,23,31	7,14,21,28	5,12,19,26	1,9,26,23,30	6,13,20,27	4,11,18,25	1,8,15,22,29	6,13,20,27
1884	Volume:	2/5 to 2/8	2/9 to 2/12	2/13 to 2/17	2/18 to 2/21	2/22 to 2/26	2/29 to 2/30	2/31 to 2/34	2/35 to 2/39	2/40 to 2/43	2/44 to 2/47	2/48 to 2/52	3/1 to 3/4
1884	Issue:	57 to 60	61 to 64	65 to 69	70 to 73	74 to 78	79 to 82	83 to 86	87 to 91	92 to 95	96 to 99	100 to 104	105 to 108
1885	Dates:	3,10,17,24,31	7,14,21,28	7,14,21,28	4,11,18,25	2,9,16,23,30	6,13,20,27	4,11,18,25	1,8,15,22,29	5,12,19,26	3,10,17,24,31	7,14,21,28	5,12,19,26
1885	Volume:	3/5 to 3/9	3/10 to 3/13	3/14 to 3/17	3/18 to 3/21	3/22 to 3/26	3/27 to 3/30	3/31 to 3/34	3/35 to 3/39	3/40 to 3/43	3/44 to 3/48	3/49 to 3/52	4/1 to 4/4
1885	Issue:	109 to 113	114 to 117	118 to 121	122 to 125	126 to 130	131 to 134	135 to 138	139 to 143	144 to 147	148 to 152	153 to 156	157 to 160
1886	Dates:	2,9,16,23,30	6,13,20,27	6,13,20,27	3,10,17,24	1,8,15,22,29	5,12,19,26	3,10,17,24,31	7,14,21,28	4,11,18,25	2,9,16,23,30	6,13,20,27	4,11,18,25
1886	Volume:	4/5 to 4/9	4/10 to 4/13	4/14 to 4/17	4/18 to 4/21	4/22 to 4/26	4/27 to 4/30	4/31 to 4/35	4/36 to 4/39	4/40 to 4/43	4/44 to 4/48	4/49 to 4/52	5/1 to 5/4
1886	Issue:	161 to 165	166 to 169	170 to 173	174 to 177	178 to 182	183 to 186	187 to 191	192 to 195	196 to 199	200 to 204	205 to 208	209 to 212
1887	Dates:	1,8,15,22,29	5,12,19,26	5,12,19,26	2,9,16,23,30	7,14,212,28	4,11,18,25	2,9,16,23,30	6,13,20,27	3,10,17,23	1,8,15,22,29	5,12,19,26	3,10,17,24,31
1887	Volume:	5/5 to 5/9	5/10 to 5/13	5/14 to 5/17	5/18 to 5/22	5/23 to 5/26	5/27 to 5/30	5/31 to 5/35	5/36 to 5/39	5/40 to 5/43	5/44 to 5/48	5/49 to 5/52	6/1 to 6/5
1887	Issue:	213 to 217	218 to 221	222 to 225	226 to 230	231 to 234	235 to 238	239 to 243	244 to 247	248 to 251	252 to 256	257 to 260	261 to 265
1888	Dates:	7,14,21,28	4,11,18,25	3,10,.17,24,31	7,14,21,28	5,12,19,26	2,9,16,23,30	7,14,21,28	4,11,18,25	1,8,15,22,29	6,13,20,27	3,10,17,24	1,8,15,22,29
1888	Volume:	6/6/ to 6/9	6/10 to 6/13	6/14 to 6/18	6/19 to 6/22	6/23 to 6/26	6/27 to 6/31	6/32 to 6/35	6/36 to 6/39	6/40 to 6/44	6/45 to 6/48	6/49 to 6/52	7/1 to 7/5
1888	Issue:	266 6o 269	270 to 273	274 to 278	279 to 282	283 to 286	287 to 291	292 to 295	296 to 299	300 to 304	305 to 308	309 to 312	313 to 317
1889	Dates:	5,12,19,26	2,9,16,23	2,9,16,23,30	6,13,20,27	4,11,18,25	1,8,15,22,29	6,13,20,27	3,10,17,24,31	7,14,21,28	5,12,19,26	2,9,16,23,30	7,14,21,28
1889	Volume:	7/6 to 7/9	7/10 to 7/13	7/14 to 7/18	7/19 to 7/22	7/23 to 7/26	8/1 to 8/5	8/6 to 8/9	8/10 to 8/14	8/15 to 8/18	8/19 to 8/22	8/23 to 89/1	9/2 to 9/5
1889	Issue:	318 to 321	322 to 325	326 to 330	331 to 334	335 to 338	339 to 343	344 to 347	348 to 352	353 to 356	357 to 360	361 to 365	366 to 369
1890	Dates:	4,11,18,25	1,8,15,22	1,8,15,22,29	5,12,19,26	3,10,17,24,31	7,14,21,28	5,12,19,26	2,9,16,23,30	6,13,20,27	4,11,18,25	1,8,15,22,29	6,13,20,27
1890	Volume:	9/6 to 9/9	9/10 to 9/13	9/14 to 9/18	9/19 to 9/22	9/23 to 10/1	10/2 to 10/5	10/6 to 10/9	10/10 to 10/14	10/15 to 10/18	10/19 to 10/22	10/23 to 11/1	11/2 to 11/5
1890	Issue:	370 to 373	374 to 377	378 to 382	383 to 386	387 to 391	392 to 395	396 to 399	400 to 404	405 to 408	409 to 412	413 to 417	418 to 421
1891	Dates:	3,10,17,24,31	7,14,21,28	7,14,21,28	4,11,18,25	2,9,16,23,30	6,13,20,27	4,11,18,25	1,8,15,22,29	5,12,19,26	3,10,17,24,31	7,14,21,28	5,12,19,26
1891	Volume:	11/6 to 11/10	11/11 to 11/14	11/15 to 11/18	11/19 to 11/22	11/23 to 12/1	12/2 to 12/5	12/6 to 12/9	12/10 to 12/14	12/15 to 12/18	12/19 to 12/23	12/24 to 13/1	13/2 to 13/5
1891	Issue:	422 to 426	427 to 430	431 to 434	435 to 438	439 to 443	444 to 447	448 to 451	452 to 456	457 to 460	461 to 465	466 to 469	470 to 473
1892	Dates:	2,9,16,23,30	6,13,20,27	5,12,19,26	2,9,16,23,30	7,14,21,28	4,11,18,25	2,9,16,23,30	6,13,20,27	3,10,17,24	1,8,15,22,29	5,12,19,26	3,10,17,24,31
1892	Volume:	13/6 to 13/10	13/11 to 13/14	13/15 to 13/18	13/19 to 13/22	13/23 to 14/1	14/2 to 14/5	14/6 to 14/10	14/11 to 14/14	14/15 to 14/18	14/19 to 14/23	14/24 to 15/1	15/2 to 15/6
1892	Issue:	474 to 478	479 to 482	483 to 486	487 to 491	492 to 495	496 to 499	500 to 504	505 to 508	509 to 512	513 to 517	518 to 521	522 to 526
1893	Dates:	7,14,21,28	4,11,18,25	4,11,18,25	1,8,15,22,29	6,13,20,27	3,10,17,24	1,8,15,22,29	5,12,19,26	2,9,16,23,30	7,14,21,28	4,11,18,25	2,9,16,23,30
1893	Volume:	15/7 to 15/10	15/11 to 15/14	15/15 to 15/18	15/19 to 15/23	15/24 to 16/1	16/2 to 16/5	16/6 to 16/10	16/11 to 16/14	16/15 to 16/19	16/20 to 16/23	16/24 to 17/1	17/2 to 17/6
1893	Issue:	527 to 530	531 to 534	535 to 538	539 to 543	544 to 547	548 to 551	552 to 556	557 to 560	561 to 565	566 to 569	570 to 573	574 to 578
1894	Dates:	6,13,20,27	3,10,17,24	3,10,17,24									
1894	Volume:	17/7 to 17/10	17/11 to 17/14	17/15 to 17/18									
1894	Issue:	579 to 582	583 to 586	587 to 590									
Frank A. Munsey Malcolm Douglas Matthew White; Not all bibliographic sources include Douglas, but Munsey's biographer, George Britt, gives details of Douglas's hire, and he is described in J. Randolph Cox's The Dime Novel Companion as "the real editor of Golden Argosy". Douglas's first issue was dated September 8, 1883, and White took over with the December 4, 1886 issue. (Note: Richard Titherington was hired by Munsey in September 1886, and recalls White being hired in December of that year, but adds that in his recollection he, Munsey and White worked together on the magazine without specific titles, and that it was not until 1889 that White could be said to have definitely taken over as editor.)

A friend from Augusta, John Fogler, who had become cashier of Augusta's First National Bank, was able to arrange another loan for Munsey, of $1,000. Munsey managed to maintain the regular weekly schedule but the financial pressure on him was enormous. Rideout had set up Munsey in an office on Barclay Street in what is now known as Tribeca, in Manhattan; Munsey moved to an office on Warren Street nearby to reduce the rent, and he and Douglas would eat in a German beer saloon where they could get a free lunch. Munsey and Douglas assembled free material by rewriting items from English boys' papers. One week, Douglas was unable to find enough material to fill an issue. Munsey wrote a short story that night: "Harry's Scheme, or Camping Among the Maples", about two boys in the Maine woods, and turned it in to Douglas the next morning. (Note: This is how Munsey's biographer recounts the events, citing Douglas as his source, but "Harry's Scheme" appeared in the February 3, 1883 issue of The Golden Argosy, before Rideout went bankrupt, so Douglas may not have been editor at the time, or he may have been hired before Munsey took control of the magazine.) Douglas twice saw Munsey write a letter to Elverson, offering the subscription list of The Golden Argosy in return for a job at $50 per week, but Munsey did not mail either letter.

In 1884 James Blaine was the Republican candidate for President. Blaine knew of Munsey from Augusta, and his campaign needed help with publicity: Munsey proposed a new magazine, Munsey's Illustrated Weekly, to carry campaign news. It only lasted two months, from September 6 to November 8, 1884, but it helped Munsey by giving him an official-seeming presence in publishing that made it much easier for him to obtain credit for paper and other supplies. Before the campaign he had been unable to get credit; after it he was $8,000 ($267,000 in 2025) in debt to his suppliers. Ten years later Munsey recalled the change, and said "That debt made me. Before, I had no credit and had to live from hand to mouth. But when I owed $8,000 my creditors didn't dare drop me. They saw their only chance of getting anything was to keep me going." Munsey had a bank account in New York, but kept two more, in Maine and Chicago, moving funds between them constantly: "I kept thousands of dollars in the air between these three banks. It was a dizzy, dazzling, daring game, a game to live for, to die for, a royal glorious game". Munsey told a story of being unable to meet payroll because the New York bank would not give him credit. He went to the bank, upbraided the president for his "effrontery", and left without letting the man speak. When his employee went to the bank again that day, he was able to cash the payroll check.

The fact that The Golden Argosy never missed an issue also helped Munsey persuade the businesses he worked with to extend him credit, which in turn helped him invest in the business. In the winter of 1885/1886 he wrote a serial, Afloat in a Great City, with the intention of using it as the basis for an advertising campaign to increase subscriptions. Munsey owed $5,000 at this point, and went into debt by about another $10,000 to advertise the story, distributing 100,000 sample copies of the March 13, 1886 issue containing the first installment of the serial in Manhattan, Brooklyn, and the surrounding areas. The campaign was a success, and from being a more-or-less breakeven concern, The Golden Argosy began to net Munsey about $100 a week in profit, not counting the cost of the campaign. This convinced Munsey to invest further in building circulation. A new editor, Matthew White, took over from Douglas at the end of the year; White had been the founder and editor of The Boys' World, which Munsey bought in 1887, merging the subscriptions with The Golden Argosy. At the same time Munsey doubled the page count and increased the price from five cents to six. In 1887 he began a national advertising campaign, with traveling representatives as far west as Nebraska, and a mail campaign for points further west. He wrote another story, The Boy Broker, for serialization, beginning in the February 5, 1887 issue, and credited it with adding 20,000 to The Golden Argosy's circulation. Over five months the campaign gave away 11,500,000 sample issues: his debt ballooned to $95,000 ($3.4 million in 2025), but he was now clearing $1,500 ($54,000 in 2025) a week in profit, and circulation reached 115,000 in May 1887. (Note: Britt quotes a circulation of 150,000, but this appears to be an error as Munsey twice cites a circulation peak of 115,000 in his own account of events.)

=== The Argosy ===
Monthly issue data for The Argosy from 1894 to 1917
	Jan	Feb	Mar	Apr	May	Jun	Jul	Aug	Sep	Oct	Nov	Dec
1894				18/1	18/2	18/3	18/4	18/5	18/6	19/1	19/2	19/3
1895	19/4	19/5	19/6	20/1	20/2	20/3	20/4	20/5	20/6	21/1	21/2	21/3
1896	21/4	21/5	21/6	22/1	22/2	22/3	22/4	22/5	22/6	23/1	23/2	23/3
1897	23/4	23/5	23/6	24/1	24/2	24/3	24/4	25/1	25/2	25/3	25/4	26/1
1898	26/2	26/3	26/4	27/1	27/2	27/3	27/4	28/1	28/2	28/3	28/4	29/1
1899	29/2	29/3	29/4	30/1	30/2	30/3	30/4	31/1	31/2	31/3	31/4	32/1
1900	32/2	32/3	32/4	33/1	33/2	33/3	33/4	34/1	34/2	34/3	34/4	35/1
1901	35/2	35/3	35/4	36/1	36/2	36/3	36/4	37/1	37/2	37/3	37/4	38/1
1902	38/2	38/3	38/4	39/1	39/2	39/3	39/4	40/1	40/2	40/3	40/4	41/1
1903	41/2	41/3	41/4	42/1	42/2	42/3	42/4	43/1	43/2	43/3	43/4	44/1
1904	44/2	44/3	44/4	45/1	45/2	45/3	45/4	46/1	46/2	46/3	46/4	47/1
1905	47/2	47/3	47/4	48/1	48/2	48/3	48/4	49/1	49/2	49/3	49/4	50/1
1906	50/2	50/3	50/4	51/1	51/2	51/3	51/4	52/1	52/2	52/3	52/4	53/1
1907	53/2	53/3	53/4	54/1	54/2	54/3	54/4	55/1	55/2	55/3	55/4	56/1
1908	56/2	56/3	56/4	57/1	57/2	57/3	57/4	58/1	58/2	58/3	58/4	59/1
1909	59/2	59/3	59/4	60/1	60/2	60/3	60/4	61/1	61/2	61/3	61/4	62/1
1910	62/2	62/3	62/4	63/1	63/2	63/3	63/4	64/1	64/2	64/3	64/4	65/1
1911	65/2	65/3	65/4	66/1	66/2	66/3	66/4	67/1	67/2	67/3	67/4	68/1
1912	68/2	68/3	68/4	69/1	69/2	69/3	69/4	70/1	70/2	70/3	70/4	71/1
1913	71/2	71/3	71/4	72/1	72/2	72/3	72/4	73/1	73/2	73/3	73/4	74/1
1914	74/2	74/3	75/4	76/1	76/2	76/3	76/4	77/1	77/2	77/3	77/4	78/1
1915	78/2	78/3	78/4	79/1	79/2	79/3	79/4	80/1	80/2	80/3	80/4	81/1
1916	81/2	81/3	81/4	82/1	82/2	82/3	82/4	83/1	83/2	83/3	83/4	84/1
1917	84/2	84/3	84/4	85/1	85/2	85/3	85/4	86/1	86/2	86/3		
Matthew White; Matthew White was editor throughout this period, though Mott reports that he spent a year or more in London working for Munsey during 1913–1914, and according to Moskowitz the editorial duties for The Argosy were handled by Bob Davis, the editor of All-Story Weekly, during this time.

The improvement in Munsey's finances in 1887 was temporary, though before Munsey realized it he had given up his cheap rooms and moved to the Windsor Hotel on Fifth Avenue. Another advertising campaign was launched; it cost $20,000 ($717,000 in 2025) but produced no results, and Munsey began to experiment with the magazine, trying to find a profitable approach. He shortened the title to just The Argosy with the December 1, 1888 issue to make it sound more like an adventure magazine and less like a children's paper. He later commented that he had not realized the problems attendant on magazines for children—they grew up quickly and dropped their subscriptions, so circulation was very difficult to maintain, and because they had little spending power it was hard to interest advertisers. He reduced the page size and increased the page count, and added illustrated covers, and cut the price, and then reversed all these changes, but nothing worked. In 1890 circulation dropped to the point where it no longer covered its own costs. The expenses Munsey had taken on after the successful campaign in 1887 were now a drain, and when his friend Fogler visited, and was impressed that Munsey was living at the Windsor, he told Fogler, "I can't afford it ... but it is a means to an end. It gives me standing to have the acquaintance of the men I meet here." Fogler also discovered on that visit that Munsey had a personal pew in a popular church, which cost him $1,000 ($90,000 in 2025) a year.

Munsey launched two more periodicals, hoping that they would establish themselves as profitable before The Argosy failed completely. The first was Munsey's Weekly, launched on February 2, 1889; the second was a newspaper, the Daily Continent, which he took over in February 1891 and gave up on four months later. The Weekly was not a success either, and in late 1891 Munsey converted it into a monthly, Munsey's Magazine, priced at twenty-five cents ($8.96 in 2025). Fogler, now working for a bank in Kansas, arranged a loan for Munsey that grew to $8,000 ($287,000 in 2025), with half Munsey's stock as collateral. During the Panic of 1893 the bank called in the loan, and Munsey offered Fogler the stock if he would take over the loan. Fogler declined, and Munsey had to arrange for another loan at 18% interest to cover the repayment. In October 1893 Munsey cut the price of Munsey's Magazine to ten cents ($3.34 in 2025). He had to struggle to distribute it at this price, since the American News Company had a monopoly on magazine distribution and had little interest in a low-priced magazine. By the February issue Munsey was printing 200,000 copies, and it soon became successful enough to guarantee his financial security.

The Argosy did not share in the success of Munsey's Magazine; circulation continued to decline, but Munsey kept it going, as he later said, "as a matter of sentiment", and to see what could be made of it. From a high of 115,000 the circulation fell to 9,000 for the March 24, 1894 issue, which was the last one as a weekly. Munsey switched it to monthly publication with the April issue, and circulation jumped to 40,000 immediately, but went no higher for over two years. With the October 1896 issue Munsey changed it to carry fiction only, targeted at adults rather than children. Starting with the December issue he began printing it on cheap wood-pulp paper, making The Argosy the first pulp magazine. The all-fiction format brought about another jump in circulation to 80,000. In 1898, with circulation still at around 80,000, Munsey bought Peterson's Magazine and merged it into The Argosy. A year or so later circulation began to climb again: Munsey spent nothing on advertising, but circulation reached 300,000 in 1902, and hit half a million in 1907, 25 years after it was launched. The magazine absorbed two other Munsey publications, The Puritan and Junior Munsey, in 1902, and Munsey credited some of the increase in circulation to the mergers.

Weekly issue data for The Argosy from 1917 to 1942
		January	February	March	April	May	June	July	August	September	October	November	December
1917	Dates:										6,13,20,27	3,10,17,24	1,8,15,22,29
1917	Volume:										87/1 to 87/4	88/1 to 88/4	89/1 to 90/1
1918	Dates:	5,12,19,26	2,9,16,23	2,9,16,23,30	6,13,20,27	4,11,18,25	1,8,15,22,29	6,13,20,27	3,10,17,24,31	7,14,21,28	5,12,19,26	2,9,16,23,30	7,14,21,28
1918	Volume:	90/2 to 91/1	91/2 to 92/1	92/2 to 93/2	93/3 to 94/2	94/3 to 95/2	95/3 to 96/3	96/4 to 97/3	97/4 to 98/4	99/1 to 99/4	100/1 to 100/4	101/1 to 102/1	102/2 to 103/1
1919	Dates:	4,11,18,25	1,8,25,22	1,8,15,22,29	5,12,19,26	3,10,17,24,31	7,14,21,28	5,12,19,26	2,9,16,23,30	6,13,20,27	4,11,18,25	1,8,15,22,29	6,13,20,27
1919	Volume:	103/2 to 104/1	104/2 to 105/1	105/2 to 106/2	106/3 to 107/2	107/3 to 108/3	108/4 to 109/3	109/4 to 110/3	110/4 to 111/4	112/1 to 112/4	113/1 to 113/4	114/1 to 115/1	115/2 to 116/1
1920	Dates:	3,10,17,24,31	7,14,21,28	6,13,20,27	3,10,17,24	1,8,15,22,29	5,12,19,26	3,10,17,24,31	7,14,21,28	4,11,18,25	2,9,16,23,30	6,13,20,27	4,11,18,25
1920	Volume:	116/2 to 117/2	117/3 to 118/2	118/3 to 199/2	119/3 to 120/2	120/3 to 121/3	121/4 to 122/3	122/4 to 123/4	124/1 to 124/4	125/1 to 125/4	126/1 to 127/1	127/2 to 128/1	128/2 to 129/1
1921	Dates:	1,8,15,22,29	5,12,19,26	5,12,19,26	2,9,16,23,30	7,14,21,28	4,11,18,25	2,9,16,23,30	6,13,20,27	3,10,17,24	1,8,15,22,29	5,12,19,26	3,10,17,24,31
1921	Volume:	129/2 to 130/2	130/3 to 131/2	131/3 to 132/2	132/3 to 133/3	133/4 to 134/3	134/4 to 135/1	135/2 to 135/6	136/1 to 136/4	136/4 to 137/2	137/3 to 138/1	138/2 to 138/5	138/6 to 139/4
1922	Dates:	7,14,21,28	4,11,18,25	4,11,18,25	1,8,15,22,29	6,13,20,27	3,10,17,24	1,8,15,22,29	5,12,19,26	2,9,16,23,30	7,14,21,28	4,11,18,25	2,9,16,23,30
1922	Volume:	139/5 to 140/2	140/3 to 140/6	141/1 to 141/4	141/5 to 142/3	142/4 to 143/1	143/2 to 143/5	143/6 to 144/4	144/5 to 145/2	145/3 to 146/1	146/2 to 146/5	146/6 to 147/3	147/4 to 148/2
1923	Dates:	6,13,20,27	3,10,17,24	3,10,17,24,31	7,14,21,28	5,12,19,26	2,9,16,23,30	7,14,21,28	4,11,18,25	1,8,15,22,29	6,13,20,27	3,10,17,24	1,8,15,22,29
1923	Volume:	148/3 to 148/6	149/1 to 149/4	149/5 to 150/3	150/4 to 151/1	151/2 to 151/5	151/6 to 152/4	152/5 to 153/2	153/3 to 153/5	153/6 to 154/5	154/6 to 155/3	155/4 to 156/1	156/2 to 156/6
1924	Dates:	5,12,19,26	2,9,16,23	1,8,15,22,29	5,12,19,26	3,10,17,24,31	7,14,21,28	5,12,19,26	2,9,16,23,30	6,13,20,27	4,11,18,25	1,8,15,22,29	6,13,20,27
1924	Volume:	157/1 to 157/4	157/5 to 158/2	158/3 to 159/1	159/2 to 159/5	159/6 to 160/4	160/5 to 161/2	161/3 to 161/6	162/1 to 162/5	162/6 to 163/3	163/4 to 164/1	164/2 to 164/6	165/1 to 165/4
1925	Dates:	3,10,17,24,31	7,14,21,28	7,14,21,28	4,11,18,25	2,9,16,23,30	6,13,20,27	4,11,18,25	1,8,15,22,29	5,12,19,26	3,10,17,24,31	7,14,21,28	5,12,19,26
1925	Volume:	165/5 to 166/3	166/4 to 167/1	167/2 to 167/5	167/6 to 168/3	168/4 to 169/2	169/3 to 169/6	170/1 to 170/4	170/5 to 171/3	171/4 to 172/1	172/2 to 172/6	173/1 to 173/4	173/5 to 174/2
1926	Dates:	2,9,16,23,30	6,13,20,27	6,13,20,27	3,10,17,24	1,8,15,22,29	5,12,19,26	3,10,17,24,31	7,14,21,28	4,11,18,25	2,9,16,23,30	6,13,20,27	4,11,18,.25
1926	Volume:	174/3 to 175/1	175/2 to 175/5	175/6 to 176/3	176/4 to 177/1	177/2 to 177/6	178/1 to 178/4	178/5 to 179/3	179/4 to 180/1	180/2 to 180/5	180/6 to 181/4	181/5 to 182/2	182/3 to 182/6
1927	Dates:	1,8,15,22,29	5,12,19,26	5,12,19,26	2,9,16,23,30	7,14,21,28	4,11,18,25	2,9,16,23,30	6,13,20,27	3,10,17,24	1,8,15,22,29	5,12,19,26	3,10,17,24,31
1927	Volume:	183/1 to 183/5	183/6 to 184/3	184/4 to 185/1	185/2 to 185/6	186/1 to 186/4	186/5 to 187/2	187/3 to 188/1	188/2 to 188/5	188/6 to 189/3	189/4 to 190/2	190/3 to 190/6	191/1 to 191/5
1928	Dates:	7,14,21,28	4,11,18,25	3,10,17,24,31	7,14,21,28	5,12,19,26	2,9,16,23,30	7,14,21,28	4,11,18,25	1,8,15,22,29	6,13,20,27	3,10,17,24,31	1,8,15,22,29
1928	Volume:	191/6 to 192/3	192/4 to 193/1	193/2 to 193/6	194/1 to 194/4	194/5 to 195/2	195/3 to 196/1	196/2 to 196/5	196/6 to 197/3	197/4 to 198/2	198/3 to 198/6	199/1 to 199/4	199/5 to 200/3
1929	Dates:	5,12,19,26	2,9,16,23	2,9,26,23,30	6,13,20,27	4,11,18,25	1,8,15,22,29	6,13,20,27	3,10,17,24,31	7,14,21,28	5,12,19,26	2,9,16,23,30	7,14,21,28
1929	Volume:	200/4 to 201/1	201/2 to 201/5	201/6 to 202/4	202/5 to 203/2	203/3 to 203/6	204/1 to 204/5	204/6 to 205/3	205/4 to 206/2	206/3 to 206/6	207/1 to 207/4	207/5 to 208/3	208/4 to 209/1
1930	Dates:	4,11,18,25	1,8,15,22	1,8,15,22,29	5,12,19,26	3,10,17,24,31	7,14,21,28	5,12,19,26	2,9,16,23,30	6,13,20,27	4,11,18,25	1,8,15,22,29	6,13,20,27
1930	Volume:	209/2 to 209/5	209/6 to 210/3	201/4 to 211/2	211/3 to 211/6	212/1 to 212/5	212/6 to 213/3	213/4 to 214/1	214/2 to 214/6	215/1 to 215/4	215/5 to 216/2	216/3 to 217/1	217/2 to 217/5
1931	Dates:	3,10,17,24,31	7,14,21,28	7,14,21,28	4,11,18,25	2,9,16,23,30	6,13,20,27	4,11,18,25	1,8,15,22,29	5,12,19,26	3,10,17,24,31	7,14,21,28	5,12,19,26
1931	Volume:	217/6 to 218/4	218/5 to 219/2	219/3 to 219/6	220/1 to 220/4	220/5 to 221/3	221/4 to 222/1	222/2 to 222/5	222/6 to 223/4	223/5 to 224/2	224/3 to 225/1	225/2 to 225/5	225/6 to 226/3
1932	Dates:	2,9,16,23,30	6,13,20,27	5,12,19,26	2,9,16,23,30	7,14,21,28	4,11,18,25	2,9,16,23,30	6,13,20,27	3,10,17,24	1,8,15,22,29	5,12,19,26	3,10,17,24,31
1932	Volume:	226/4 to 227/2	227/3 to 227/6	228/1 to 228/4	228/5 to 229/3	229/4 to 230/1	230/2 to 230/5	230/6 to 231/4	231/5 to 232/2	232/3 to 232/6	233/1 to 233/5	233/6 to 234/3	234/4 to 235/2
1933	Dates:	7,14,21,28	4,11,18,25	4,11,18,25	1,8,15,22,29	6,13,20,27	3,10,17,24	1,8,15,22,29	5,12,19	2,9,16,23,30	7,14,21,28	4,11,18,25	2,9,16,23,30
1933	Volume:	235/3 to 235/6	236/1 to 236/4	236/5 to 237/2	237/3 to 238/1	238/2 to 238/5	238/6 to 239/3	239/4 to 240/2	240/3 to 240/5	240/6 to 241/4	241/5 to 242/2	242/3 to 242/6	243/1 to 243/5
1934	Dates:	6,13,20,27	3,10,17,24	3,10,17,24,31	7,14,21,28	5,12,19,26	2,9,16,23,30	7,14,21,28	4,11,18,25	1,8,15,22,29	6,13,20,27	3,10,17,24	1,8,15,22,29
1934	Volume:	243/6 to 244/3	244/4 to 245/1	245/2 to 245/6	246/1 to 246/4	246/5 to 247/2	247/3 to 248/1	248/2 to 248/5	248/6 to 249/3	249/4 to 250/2	250/3 to 250/6	251/1 to 251/4	251/5 to 252/3
1935	Dates:	5,12,19,26	2,9,16,23	2,9,16,23,30	6,13,20,27	4,11,18,25	1,8,15,22,29	6,13,20,27	3,10,17,24,31	7,14,21,28	5,12,19,26	2,9,16,23,30	7,14,21,28
1935	Volume:	252/4 to 253/1	253/2 to 253/5	253/6 to 254/4	254/5 to 255/2	255/3 to 255/6	256/1 to 256/5	256/6 to 257/3	257/4 to 258/2	258/3 to 258/6	259/1 to 259/4	259/5 to 260/3	260/4 to 261/1
1936	Dates:	4,11,18,25	1,8,15,22,29	7,14,21,28	4,11,18,25	2,9,16,23,30	6,13,20,27	4,11,18,25	1,8,15,22,29	5,12,19,26	3,10,17,24,31	7,14,21,28	5,12,19,26
1936	Volume:	261/2 to 261/5	261/6 to 262/4	262/5 to 263/2	263/3 to 263/6	264/1 to 264/5	264/6 to 265/3	265/4 to 266/1	266/2 to 266/6	267/1 to 267/4	267/5 to 268/3	268/4 to 269/1	269/2 to 269/5
1937	Dates:	2,9,16,23,30	6,13,20,27	6,13,20,27	3,10,17,24	1,8,15,22,29	5,12,19,26	3,10,17,24,31	7,14,21,28	4,11,18,25	2,9,16,23,30	6,13,20,27	4,11,18,25
1937	Volume:	269/6 to 270/4	270/5 to 271/2	271/3 to 271/6	272/1 to 272/4	272/5 to 273/3	273/4 to 274/1	274/2 to 274/6	275/1 to 275/4	275/5 to 276/2	276/3 to 277/1	277/2 to 277/5	277/6 to 278/3
1938	Dates:	1,8,15,22,29	5,12,19,26	5,12,19,26	2,9,16,23,30	7,14,21,28	4,11,18,25	2,9,16,23,30	6,13,20,27	3,10,17,24	1,8,15,22,29	5,12,19,26	3,10,17,24,31
1938	Volume:	278/4 to 279/2	279/3 to 279/6	280/1 to 280/4	280/5 to 281/3	281/4 to 282/1	282/2 to 282/5	282/6 to 283/4	283/5 to 284/2	284/3 to 284/6	285/1 to 285/5	285/6 to 186/3	286/4 to 287/2
1939	Dates:	7,14,21,28	4,11,18,25	4,11,18,25	1,8,15,22,29	6,13,20,27	3,10,17,24	1,8,15,22,29	5,12,19,26	2,9,16,23,30	7,14,21,28	4,11,18,25	2,9,16,23,30
1939	Volume:	287/3 to 287/6	288/1 to 288/4	288/5 to 289/2	289/3 to 290/1	290/2 to 290/5	290/6 to 291/3	291/4 to 292/2	292/3 to 292/6	293/1 to 293/5	293/6 to 294/3	294/4 to 295/1	295/2 to 295/6
1940	Dates:	6,13,20,27	3,10,17,24	2,9,16,23,30	6,13,20,27	4,11,18,25	1,8,15,22,29	6,13,20,27	3,10,17,24,31	7,14,21,28	5,12,19,26	2,9,16,23,30	7,14,21,28
1940	Volume:	296/1 to 296/4	296/5 to 297/2	297/3 to 298/1	298/2 to 298/5	298/6 to 299/3	299/4 to 300/2	300/3 to 300/6	301/1 to 301/5	301/6 to 302/3	302/4 to 303/1	303/2 to 303/6	304/1 to 304/4
1941	Dates:	4,11,18,25	1,8,15,22	1,8,15,22,29	5,12,19,26	3,10,17,24,31	7,14,21,28	5,12,19,26	2,9,16,23,30	6,13,20,27	4	1,15,29	13,27
1941	Volume:	304/5 to 305/2	305/3 to 305/6	306/1 to 306/5	306/6 to 307/3	307/4 to 308/2	308/3 to 308/6	309/1 to 309/4	309/5 to 310/3	310/4 to 311/1	311/2	311/3 to 311/5	311/6 to 312/1
1942	Dates:	10,24	7,21	7,15	1,15								
1942	Volume:	312/2 to 312/3	312/4 to 312/5	312/6 to 313/1	313/2 to 313/3								
Matthew White A. H. Bittner (June 1928 – June 1931 Don Moore (July 1931 – July 1934) Frederick Clayton (August 1934 – April 1936) Jack Byrne (May 1936 – June 1937) Chandler H. Whipple (July 1937 – June 1939) George W. Post (July 1939 – February 1942 Harry Gray (March 1942 – August 1942)

The Argosy's circulation fell from this peak, and it returned to a weekly schedule in 1917. In 1906 Munsey had started The Railroad Man's Magazine, which carried both fiction and non-fiction; after the January 18, 1919 issue it was merged into The Argosy, which was briefly retitled Argosy and Railroad Man's Magazine, reverting to just Argosy with the May 31 issue. Paper shortages caused by World War I forced a reduction in the page count of both The Argosy and All-Story Weekly, another Munsey fiction magazine, and costs continued to go up after the war. Most of the other major fiction magazines of the day increased their price to twenty cents ($6.43 in 2025). At fifteen cents, Top-Notch Magazine was an exception, but Munsey kept both Argosy and All-Story at only ten cents. In 1920 he merged All-Story Weekly into The Argosy, explaining that this let him keep the price of the combined magazine at ten cents, while saving "all the cost of stories in one magazine, all the cost of the editorial force, all the cost of typesetting, all the cost of making electrotype plates, and many other minor costs". Sam Moskowitz, a magazine historian, argues that the low price, sustained through most of the 1920s, must have been a strong benefit to circulation, which is reported to have reached half a million when the combined magazine, now titled Argosy All-Story Weekly, debuted. Circulation stayed at about 400,000 during the following decade. The first issue of the new magazine added pages to allow it to carry continuations of the serials that had been running in each of the two magazines before the merger, and Moskowitz comments that this approach "was such that it is doubtful that a single nonduplicating reader was lost from either magazine". The page count gradually dropped again as the serials were completed, from 224 after the merger to 144 at the end of the year.

=== Dewart, Popular Publications, and later revivals ===
Monthly issue data for The Argosy from 1942 to 1970
	Jan	Feb	Mar	Apr	May	Jun	Jul	Aug	Sep	Oct	Nov	Dec
1942					313/4	313/5	313/6	314/1	314/2	314/3	314/4	314/5
1943	314/6	315/1	315/2	315/3	315/4	315/5	315/6	316/1	316/2	316/3	316/4	317/1
1944	317/2	317/3	317/4	318/1	318/2	318/3	318/4	419/1	319/2	319/3	319/4	
1945	320/1	320/2	320/3	320/4	321/1	321/2	321/3	321/4	211/1			
1946					322/2	322/3	322/4		323/1	323/2	323/3	323/4
1947	324/1	324/2	324/3	324/4	324/5	324/6	325/1	325/2	325/3	325/4	325/5	325/6
1948	326/1	326/2	326/3	326/4	326/5	326/6	327/1	327/2	327/3	327/4	327/5	327/6
1949	328/1	328/2	328/3	328/4	328/5	328/6	329/1	329/2	329/3	329/4	329/5	329/6
1950	330/1	330/2	330/3	330/4	330/5	330/6	331/1	331/2	331/3	331/4	331/5	331/6
1951	332/1	332/2	332/3	332/4	332/5	332/6	333/1	333/2	333/3	333/4	333/5	333/6
1952	334/1	334/2	334/3	334/4	334/5	334/6	335/1	335/2	335/3	335/4	335/5	335/6
1953	336/1	336/2	336/3	336/4	336/5	336/6	337/1	337/2	337/3	337/4	337/5	337/6
1954	338/1	338/2	338/3	338/4	338/5	338/6	339/1	339/2	339/3	339/4	339/5	339/6
1955	340/1	340/2	340/3	340/4	340/5	340/6	341/1	341/2	341/3	341/4	341/5	341/6
1956	342/1	342/2	342/3	342/4	342/5	342/6	343/1	343/2	343/3	343/4	343/5	343/6
1957	344/1	344/2	344/3	344/4	344/5	344/6	345/1	345/2	345/3	345/4	345/5	345/6
1958	346/1	346/2	346/3	346/4	346/5	346/6	347/1	347/2	347/3	347/4	347/5	347/6
1959	348/1	348/2	348/3	348/4	348/5	348/6	349/1	349/2	349/3	349/4	349/5	349/6
1960	350/1	350/2	350/3	350/4	350/5	350/6	351/1	351/2	351/3	351/4	351/5	351/6
1961	352/1	352/2	352/3	352/4	352/5	352/6	353/1	353/2	353/3	353/4	353/5	353/6
1962	354/1	354/2	354/3	354/4	354/5	354/6	355/1	355/2	355/3	355/4	355/5	355/6
1963	356/1	356/2	356/3	356/4	356/5	356/6	357/1	357/2	357/3	357/4	357/5	357/6
1964	358/1	358/2	358/3	358/4	358/5	358/6	359/1	359/2	359/3	359/4	359/5	359/6
1965	360/1	360/2	360/3	360/4	360/5	360/6	361/1	361/2	361/3	361/4	361/5	361/6
1966	362/1	362/2	362/3	362/4	362/5	362/6	363/1	363/2	363/3	363/4	363/5	363/6
1967	364/1	364/2	364/3	364/4	364/5	364/6	365/1	365/2	365/3	365/4	365/5	365/6
1968	366/1	366/2	366/3	366/4	366/5	366/6	367/1	367/2	367/3	367/4	367/5	367/6
1969	368/1	368/2	368/3	368/4	368/5	368/6	369/1	369/2	369/3	369/4	369/5	369/6
1970	370/1	370/2	370/3	370/4	370/5	370/6	371/1	371/2	371/3	371/4	371/5	371/6
Harry Gray (May – August 1942) Burroughs Mitchell (September – October 1942) Rogers Terrill (November 1942 – Feb 1944) Harry Steeger (Mar 1944 – Jul 1949 and Jun 1955 – April 1970) Jerry Mason (Aug 1949 – Jun 1953) Howard J. Lewis (Jul 1953 – Sep 1954) James B. O'Connell (Oct 1954) Ken W. Purdy (Nov 1954 – May 1955) Hal Steeger (May 1970 – Dec 1970)

In December 1925 Munsey had appendicitis, and never recovered; he died, aged 71, on December 22. The Frank A. Munsey Corporation, which continued as the publisher, was sold to William Dewart, who had been working for Munsey. Matthew White, who had been editor since 1886, was finally replaced by A. H. Bittner in 1928. Bittner stayed as editor for three years; and his successors throughout the 1930s each lasted between one and three years. In October 1929 Munsey's Magazine and Argosy All-Story Weekly were combined and immediately split again into two magazines: one was titled All-Story Combined with Munsey's, and the other continued as Argosy.

In 1932 Don Moore, who had become editor in July 1931, bought two stories from Frank Morgan Mercer that turned out to have been copied from earlier stories by H. Bedford-Jones and James Francis Dwyer. Up to this point Argosy paid on acceptance; because of the plagiarism the policy was changed to pay new authors only after publication, to allow plagiarism to be detected. (Note: Bedford-Jones tracked down Mercer's address and went to see him, taking a police officer with him in the hope of taking him to court. To his surprise he discovered that Mercer had been quite unaware that plagiarism was illegal, and had thought only that he had come up with a clever way of making money. The police officer commented to Bedford-Jones that Mercer "didn't belong in jail, but in the bughouse".)

Moore left to work at Cosmopolitan in mid-1934, and was replaced by Frederick Clayton, who had been associate editor. In 1936 Clayton was hired by Liberty, and Jack Byrne, who had been working at Fiction House, took over as editor for a year before being replaced by Chandler Whipple. Another Munsey magazine, All-American Fiction, was merged into Argosy in 1938. In 1939 Whipple resigned and George Post, who had been part of Whipple's editorial team, became editor.

Argosy remained a weekly until the October 4, 1941 issue, then switched to an irregular schedule with two issues a month. Post left in early 1942, and was briefly replaced by Harry Gray and then for two issues by Burroughs Mitchell.

In September 1942 Popular Publications, a pulp magazine publisher, bought all the Munsey pulp magazine titles from Dewart, including Argosy, which by this time had a circulation of only 40,000 to 50,000. (Note: Peterson gives a circulation of 11,500 at the time of the acquisition, and Newsweek gives it variously as 40,000 and 47,000. Moonan gives a figure of 40,000.) The new editor was Rogers Terrill. Argosy ceased to use pulp paper from 1943, becoming a slick magazine. In early 1944 Harry Steeger, the owner of Popular, took over the editorship for five years, hiring Jerry Mason away from This Week in 1949 to replace himself as editor. Mason stayed for four years; when he left in mid-1953 Howard Lewis was promoted to editor from executive editor. Lewis resigned in 1954, and was replaced for one issue (October 1954) by James O'Connell, who had been fiction editor of Argosy since 1948. Ken Purdy, the editor of Argosy's main rival, True, was hired, but stayed less than a year. Steeger later said that hiring Purdy was the most expensive mistake he ever made; Argosy ran at a substantial loss under his editorship. Steeger then took the editing chair again. Circulation prospered under Popular, reaching 600,000 in June 1948, and 1.25 million by 1954. This growth was aided by some lucky publicity, broadcast to millions of radio listeners: after the acquisition by Popular, Argosy was the subject of a question on the popular Take It or Leave It radio show, which referred to it as a pulp magazine. Two weeks later the show's host apologized, and asked the studio audience to chant "Argosy is a slick" on the air.

Argosy's circulation remained over a million until at least 1973, and the advertising revenue this provided made the magazine an attractive acquisition target. Steeger sold Popular Publications to David Geller's Brookside Publications in 1972. In early January 1978 Geller sold the company to the Filipacchi Group. The last issue from Popular was dated November/December 1978.

=== Special issues, associated magazines, and revivals ===
Monthly issue data for The Argosy from 1971 to 1979
	Jan	Feb	Mar	Apr	May	Jun	Jul	Aug	Sep	Oct	Nov	Dec
1971	372/1	372/2	372/3	372/4	372/5	372/6	373/1	373/2	373/3	373/4	373/5	373/6
1972	374/1	374/2	374/3	374/4	374/5	374/6	375/1	375/2	375/3	375/4	375/5	375/6
1973	376/1	376/2	376/3	376/4	376/5	376/6	377/7	377/8	377/9	377/10	377/11	377/12
1974	379/1	379/2	379/3	379/4	379/5	379/6	380/1	380/2	380/3	280/4	280/5	280/6
1975	281/1	281/2	281/3	281/4	281/5	281/6	282/1	282/2	282/3	282/4	282/5	382/6
1976		383/1	383/2	383/3	383/4	383/5	384/1	384/2	384/3	384/4	384/5	384/6
1977		384/7	384/8	385/3	385/4	385/5	385/6	386/1	386/2	386/3	386/4	386/5
1978		386/6	387/1	387/2	387/3	387/4	387/5	387/6	388/1	388/2	338/3	
1979								339/1	339/2	339/3	339/4	
Hal Steeger (Jan 1971 – Jan 1972) Milt Machlin (Feb 1972 – Mar 1973) Gil Paust (Apr 1973 – Feb 1974) Randolph Sugar (Mar 1974 – Apr 1975) Ernest Baxter (May 1975 – Jun 1976) Lou Sahadi (July 1976 – Nov/Dec 1978) Garrik Roen (Aug 1979 – Nov 1979)

In addition to the monthly issues, between 1975 and 1978 Argosy published about fifty special issues on specific topics such as sharks, basketball, guns, or treasure hunting. There were also two associated magazines: Argosy UFO appeared in July 1976 and ceased publication with its eighth issue, dated Winter 1977/1978. Argosy Gun produced four issues dated from Fall 1977 and Summer 1978, and may have published more.

Argosy has been revived four times. Four monthly issues appeared starting in August 1979, published by Lifetime Wholesalers, Inc. The last issue was dated November 1979. Between 1989 and 1994, six issues were produced by Richard Kyle, at irregular intervals. Three more issues, dated in 2004 and 2005, appeared from Lou Anders and James A. Owen, with the third issue edited by Owen alone, and retitled Argosy Quarterly. One more issue, from Altus Press, appeared in 2016, edited by Matthew Moring.

== Contents and reception ==
=== Early years ===
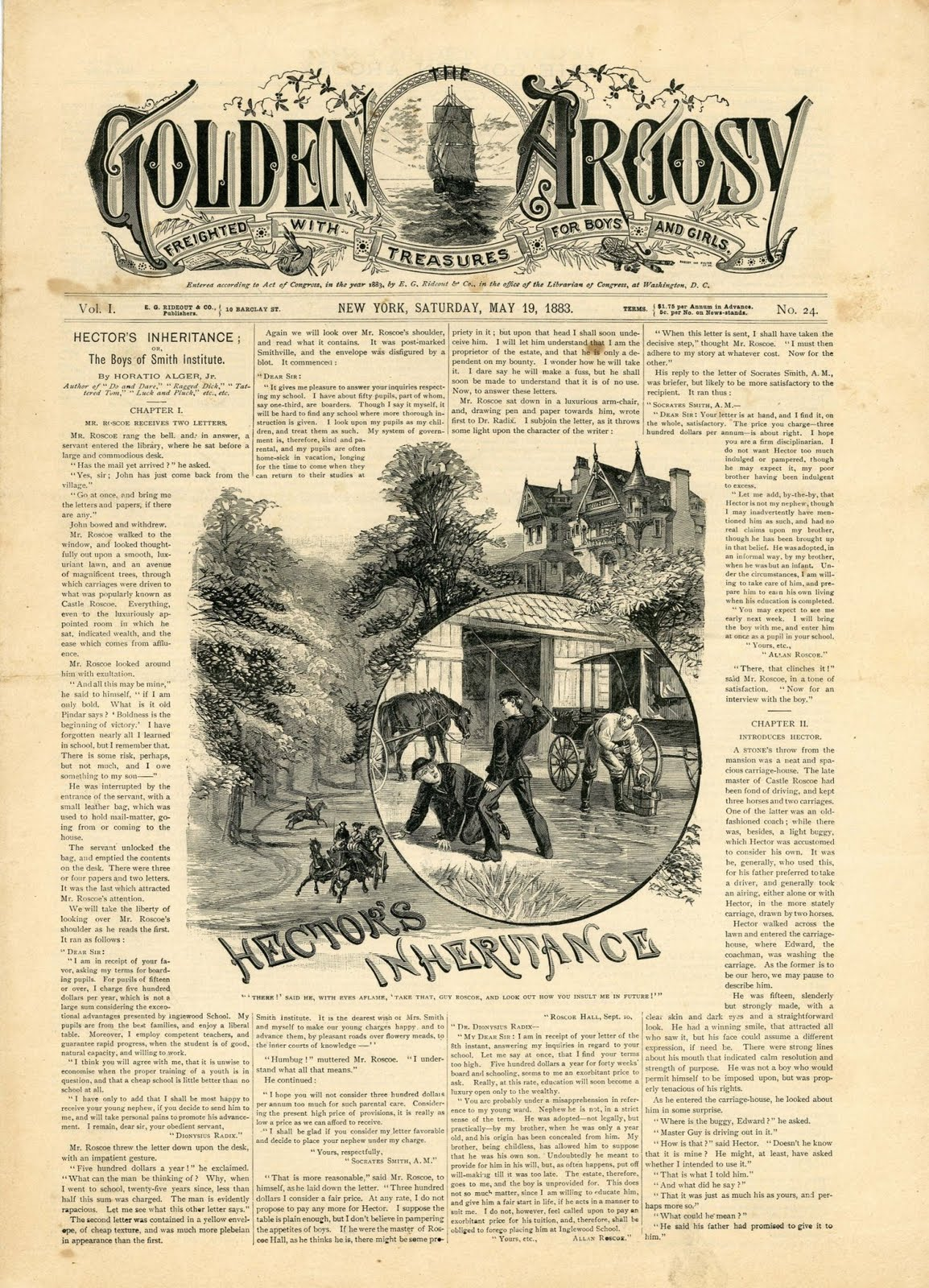
Cover of The Golden Argosy for May 19, 1883, featuring the first installment of Hector's Inheritance by Horatio Alger

The first issue of The Golden Argosy included the first installment of two novels: Do and Dare, or a Brave Boy's Fight for a Fortune, by Horatio Alger, which took the cover page, and Nick and Nellie, or God Helps them that Helps Themselves, by Edward S. Ellis. There were also short stories and some non-fiction. The target audience was both boys and girls, from ten to twenty years old. When Munsey began to write serialized novels for the magazine, starting with Afloat in a Great City in 1886, he used the same basic plot that Alger had been successful with: rags to riches stories of boys succeeding against the odds. Other early serials were boys' adventure tales, occasionally with science fiction ideas such as lost races. Multiple serials often ran simultaneously. Early contributors included Harry Castlemon, whose Don Gordon's Shooting-Box began serialization in the March 3, 1883 issue; Frank H. Converse, who in addition to an early serial (A Voyage to the Gold Coast, or Jack Bond's Quest, beginning in the March 24, 1883 issue) had several short stories in the first couple of years of the magazine; Oliver Optic, (Making a Man of Himself, beginning in the October 20, 1883 issue); and G. A. Henty (Facing Peril: A Tale of the Coal Mines, from September 5, 1885).

The magazine's subtitle, Freighted with Treasures for Boys and Girls, was dropped in 1886, though the contents were still aimed at the same youthful readers as before. P. T. Barnum's Dick Broadhead: a Story of Wild Animals and the Circus was serialized from May to August 1887. There was little science fiction in the early years; one exception was The Conquest of the Moon, by Andre Laurie, which began serialization in The Argosy in 1889; another was William Murray Graydon's The River of Darkness; or, Under Africa (1890). "When the Redcoats Came to Bennington", an early story by Upton Sinclair, appeared in the December 1895 issue.

=== Pulp era ===
==== Editorial policy ====
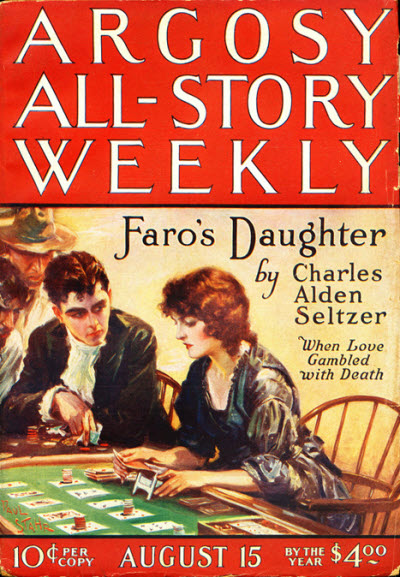
Cover of the August 15, 1925 issue

After the change to an all-fiction monthly format in 1896, The Argosy was a men's and boy's adventure magazine, though The Encyclopedia of Science Fiction describes many of the serials in the first decade or so after the change as "still only a little above juvenile adventure stories". In 1926, Albert William Stone, a fairly prolific pulp author, visited Manhattan to meet with the editors of the various magazines he had been selling to, and find out more about what their requirements were for submissions. Stone had sold several stories to Bob Davis, the editor of All-Story Weekly, before its merger with The Argosy, but had never sold to Matthew White, who had been editor of The Argosy since before the change to pulp format. White had sent Stone an encouraging note in reply to an early submission of his: "Two things I like about this story are its Western atmosphere, and its brevity—two thousand five hundred words ... If those hints are of any value to you, try us again." In the interview with Stone, White expanded upon what he was looking for. "I require yarns ... that violate the traditions relative to 'logical development'. By this I mean that I do not want the story developed in what is commonly called the 'natural' way. I require unexpected development—surprises at every turn it is possible to have them without destroying the convincingness of the story ... In other words, stories that are a constant challenge to the author's inventive ability, one situation after another, and that keep the writer perspiring freely."

Ed Hulse, a historian of pulp magazines, while generally praising the quality of the fiction in Argosy during the pulp era, comments that during the 1920s some "bland, conventional dramas" appeared in the magazine, by writers such as Edgar Franklin, Isabel Ostrander, and E. J. Rath. Hulse suggests that this editorial policy was aimed at attracting more women readers to the magazine.

After White's editorship, and for the next fifteen years, the requirements that Argosy's editors sent to writers' magazines such as Writer's Digest and Author & Journalist emphasized that they were looking for stories focused on action, with a masculine point of view. Bittner's comments in 1928 asked for "any good clean story with sound plot, rapid-fire action and strong masculine appeal", and gave a long list of genres all of which were acceptable—even romance so long as "the love element is not unduly stressed". In 1931 Moore outlined the stories to be excluded: "love or domestic tales, sex stories, stories with a predominant woman interest or told from a woman’s viewpoint". In 1935 Clayton provided a list of hackneyed plots to be avoided, including escaping convicts, an underwater adventure in which the hero fights an octopus and a giant clam as well as the villain, and a legionnaire who "dies gloriously for Dear Old France". The policy of action stories told from a male viewpoint continued through the rest of the decade.

==== New writers ====
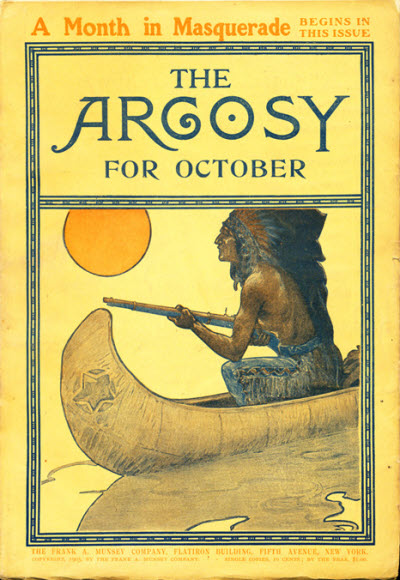
Cover of the October 1905 issue

Many writers who later became well-known sold to The Argosy early in their careers. William MacLeod Raine's first story, "The Luck of Eustace Blount", appeared in the March 1899 issue. William Wallace Cook contributed numerous serials in the first decade of the 20th century, beginning with The Spur of Necessity in the September 1900 issue after half-a-dozen sales to other markets. Cook wrote adventure fiction with elements of satire, an unusual combination for the pulps. James Branch Cabell's first sale was to The Argosy; his "An Amateur Ghost" appeared in the February 1902 issue. William Hamilton Osborne's first sale was also to The Argosy, but after paying for it White returned the story to Osborne as the plot was too similar to other stories that had appeared elsewhere. It did eventually appear in the New York Daily News, but Osborne's first appearance in print was in The Argosy with "Turner's Luck with Rouge et Noir", in the September 1902 issue. Louis Joseph Vance, the creator of the character The Lone Wolf, published most of his fiction in The Popular Magazine, but his first two sales were to Munsey, including The Coil of Circumstance, a serial that began in the November 1903 Argosy. Albert Payson Terhune, later the author of Lad: A Dog, frequently published in the Munsey magazines early in his career. His first sale to The Argosy was "The Fugitive", a novella that began serialization in the August 1905 issue, and he sold a dozen more stories to the magazine over the next few years. An early story by Mary Roberts Rinehart, "The Misadventures of a Pearl Necklace", appeared in February the following year.

==== Science fiction and fantasy ====
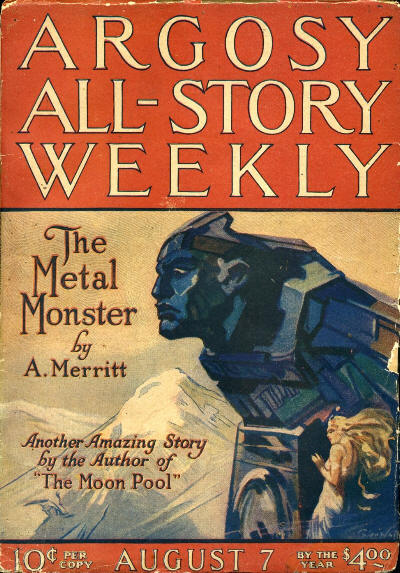
Cover for the story "The Metal Monster" by A. Merritt (August 7, 1920)

The first pulp issue, in December 1896, included a science fiction story, "Citizen 504", by C. H. Palmer, and science fiction featured regularly thereafter. Five science fiction adventure novels by William Wallace Cook appeared, starting in 1903 with A Round Trip to the Year 2000, or A Flight Through Time. Lost race stories continued to appear, such as Frank Aubrey's A Queen of Atlantis (1899), Frank Savile's Beyond the Great South Wall (1899–1900), and Perley Poore Sheehan's The Abyss of Wonders (1915), described by Hulse as "arguably the finest lost race novel ever to appear in a Munsey magazine". Francis Stevens contributed another lost world novel, The Citadel of Fear, in 1918.

Humorous stories about scientific inventions were another theme. Howard Rogert Garis began selling to Argosy in 1904; his "Professor Jonkin" stories were lighthearted examples of the genre, and other examples came from H.D. Smiley, whose "Bagley's Coagulated Cyclone" and "Bagley's Rain-Machine" appeared in the September 1906 and February 1907 issues. Some more sophisticated science fiction also appeared, including "Finis", an end of the world story by Frank Lillie Pollock, in June 1906. George Griffith, an important early science fiction writer from the UK, published almost none of his work in the US in his lifetime. An exception was The Lake of Gold, serialized in The Argosy from December 1902 to July 1903, in which a group of Britons and Americans use the riches from a lake of gold in Patagonia to enforce peace across Europe. (Note: The other work of Griffith's to appear in the US was Stories of Other Worlds, in 1900, in the US edition of Pearson's Magazine, which at the time carried the same material as the UK edition. Thus, while two of Griffith's serials were published in the US, only The Lake of Gold was published in a magazine that was both edited and published in the US.)

The Argosy's sister magazine, All-Story Weekly, was the venue for most of the science fiction in the Munsey magazines, but Argosy printed Murray Leinster's first science fiction story, "The Runaway Skyscraper", in 1919. (Note: The story had been written at White's request, after Leinster had mentioned in a letter he was working on a story that started "The whole thing began when the clock on the Metropolitan Tower began to run backwards". Once White asked to see it, Leinster "had to write it or admit I was lying".) Leinster's first sale, "The Atmosphere", had appeared in The Argosy the previous year. Edgar Rice Burroughs's Barsoom series had begun in All-Story Weekly, as had his Tarzan novels; when the two magazines merged in 1920 later episodes of each series appeared in the combined magazine, Argosy All-Story Weekly. Abraham Merritt's The Metal Monster began serialization in the August 7 issue, the third one after the merger, and many more science fiction and fantasy stories followed in the next two decades by authors such as Ray Cummings, Ralph Milne Farley, Otis Adelbert Kline, Victor Rousseau, Eando Binder, Donald Wandrei, Manly Wade Wellman, Jack Williamson, Arthur Leo Zagat, and Henry Kuttner. Merritt's The Ship of Ishtar, which was serialized in 1924, was voted Argosy's most popular story in a reader poll in 1938. In 1940 and 1941 Frederick C. Painton published a series of stories in Argosy about Joel Quaite, a time detective who travels into the past to solve mysteries.

Erle Stanley Gardner, later famous for his Perry Mason detective stories, sold "Rain Magic", his first science fiction short story, to Argosy in 1928, and went on to write several more. Gardner combined science fiction with detective plots in some of these stories, and he was not the only writer to do so: Garret Smith's "You've Killed Privacy!" in the July 7, 1928 Argosy was about using CCTV to catch criminals, and Leinster's "Darkness on Fifth Avenue", in the November 30, 1929 Argosy, about a device that can bring artificial darkness to an area, was originally intended for the detective pulps.

==== Other genres ====
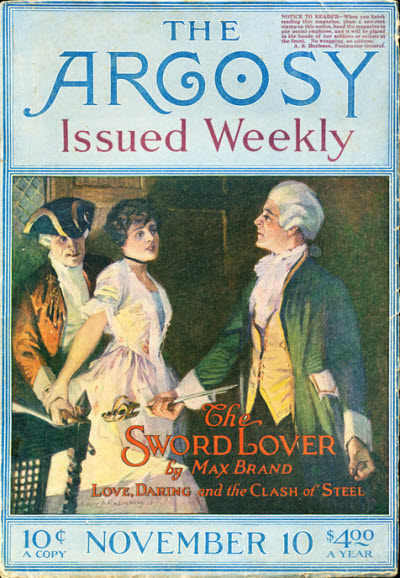
Cover of the November 10, 1917 issue

Argosy's Western fiction included Zane Grey's Last of the Duanes, which appeared in the September 1914 Argosy, and Walt Coburn's first story, "The Peace Treaty of the Seven Up", in the July 8, 1922 issue. Max Brand, a very prolific Western writer, sold his first pulp stories to All-Story in 1917, but by the end of the year had begun selling to Argosy too. Clarence Mulford was the creator of the character Hopalong Cassidy; the first few stories in the series appeared in other magazines, but many were published in Argosy in the early 1920s. Robert E. Howard, best known for his stories about Conan the Barbarian, also wrote Westerns, several of which were published in Argosy in the mid-1930s.

O. Henry appeared in the March 1904 Argosy with "Witches Loaves". H. Bedford-Jones, a popular author with over 1,000 stories published in the pulps over his career, sold his first story, "Out of a Stormy Sky", to The Argosy in 1910, and appeared in its pages regularly for the next four decades. Bedford-Jones's series about adventurer John Solomon began with The Gate of Farewell, serialized in the January and February 1914 issues, and continued in The Argosy and elsewhere for over twenty years. George Worts published the first of his "Peter the Brazen" series, about an "expert wireless operator and dauntless adventurer", in Argosy in the October 5, 1918 issue; it became one of the most popular series in the magazine, with all twenty stories appearing in Argosy into the mid-1930s. Under his own name and a pseudonym, Loring Brent, Worts contributed scores of other stories to Argosy over the same period. Johnston McCulley had launched his Zorro series in All-Story in 1919 and more episodes appeared in Argosy after the two magazines merged.

Fred MacIsaac, one of Argosy's most popular authors, first appeared in the November 1, 1924 issue with the first installment of his novel Nothing but Money. Most of MacIsaac's work was not science fiction; an exception was The Hothouse World, a serial that ran in Argosy from February 21 to March 28, 1931. Theodore Roscoe was a frequent contributor of adventure stories set in exotic locations such as Timbuktu and Saigon. He traveled the world once his writing began to pay him well enough to allow him to do so, and used the experience to add color to his stories. Borden Chase sold his first story, "Tunnel Men", to Argosy in 1934 while he was a laborer on the tunnel being built under the East River in New York. He became a regular contributor, and his "East River", which appeared in Argosy in December 1934, was filmed the following year as Under Pressure. Ship of the Line, an early novel in C. S. Forester's stories about Horatio Hornblower, was serialized in Argosy in early 1938. Max Brand, though best known for his Westerns, wrote in many other genres as well, including historical fiction and mystery stories. He was the creator of Dr. Kildare, and four novels in the series appeared in Argosy between 1938 and 1940. Mystery contributors included Cornell Woolrich, beginning with "Hot Water" in the December 28, 1935 issue, and Norbert Davis.

==== Art ====
In 1903 Street & Smith launched The Popular Magazine, an early pulp rival to The Argosy with color art on the cover. Up to this point The Argosy had had text only on the cover, and no art, but in 1905, probably in response to The Popular Magazine, it began to run limited color art on the cover, and in 1912 it began to use full-color cover art. At the start of the 1920s the most frequent cover artists for Argosy were Modest Stein, Stockton Mulford, and P. J Monahan; by the end of the decade Paul Stahr and Robert Graef had taken over most of the covers, and remained the main cover artists until the mid-1930s. Hulse considers the artwork of this era to have been "consistently good". Towards the end of the 1930s Rudolph Belarski, Emmett Watson, and George Rozen become regular cover artists.

Virgil Finlay was a popular illustrator for the Munsey magazines at the end of the 1930s and start of the 1940s. When Argosy planned to reprint Seven Footprints to Satan, one of A. Merritt's novels, in 1939, Merritt persuaded the editor, G. W. Post, to use Finlay as the interior illustrator.

=== Men's magazine era ===
==== Transition from pulp format ====
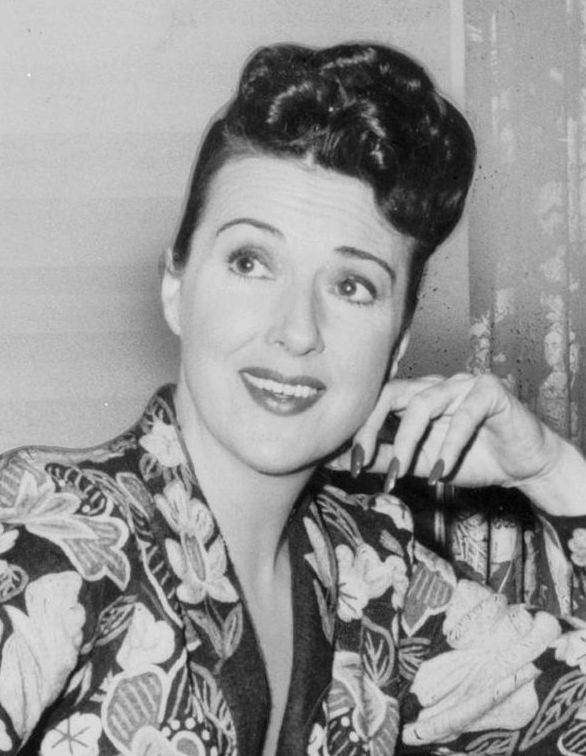
Gypsy Rose Lee, the author of The G-String Murders, which were part of Argosy's citation for obscenity in 1942

In 1942, in an attempt to revive the magazine's fortunes, the all-fiction format was abandoned and articles about World War II and "sensationalized" news stories were added. The cover was redesigned starting with the March 7, 1942, issue, with the outline of a jet plane replacing the galleon behind the title, and a picture of the film star Dorothy Lamour on the cover instead of the usual adventure-themed cover art. The title was changed to The New Argosy, though this change was reversed with the August issue. The publication frequency was changed to monthly starting in May.

The new version of Argosy was almost immediately caught in a crackdown by Frank Walker, the Postmaster General. The Post Office declared that publishers should consider "decency and good morals" in deciding what could be included in a mailed magazine, and promptly notified dozens of publishers that they had to attend a hearing in Washington or lose their permits. Argosy's citation from the Post Office listed stories considered to be obscene; the list included The G-String Murders, a serial by Rose Louise Hovick (better known as the burlesque performer Gypsy Rose Lee) that began in May 1942, and "How Paris Apaches Terrorize Nazis in Girl Orgies" and "Sex Outrages by Jap Soldiers", articles in the July and August 1942 issues. The hearings were thought by most publishers to be pointless, and nobody from Munsey attended. Argosy briefly lost its permit as a result, (Note: First-class mail was much more expensive than a second-class mailing permit, so the permanent loss of a permit meant the death of the magazine.) but did not miss any issues.

When Popular Publications acquired Argosy at the end of 1942, they announced that it would immediately return to a fiction-only format. Richard Abbott, the editor of Writer's Digest, commented that Popular were "again making Argosy the fine old book it was", and that when they acquired Argosy it had "recently been degraded by wretched editing". In September 1943, the format changed from pulp to slick, but Popular still planned to print only fiction. Rogers Terrill, the editor, announced that "we have stepped out of the pulp field entirely ... We felt there was room in the country for an all-fiction slick, and we're it."

==== Slick men's magazine era ====
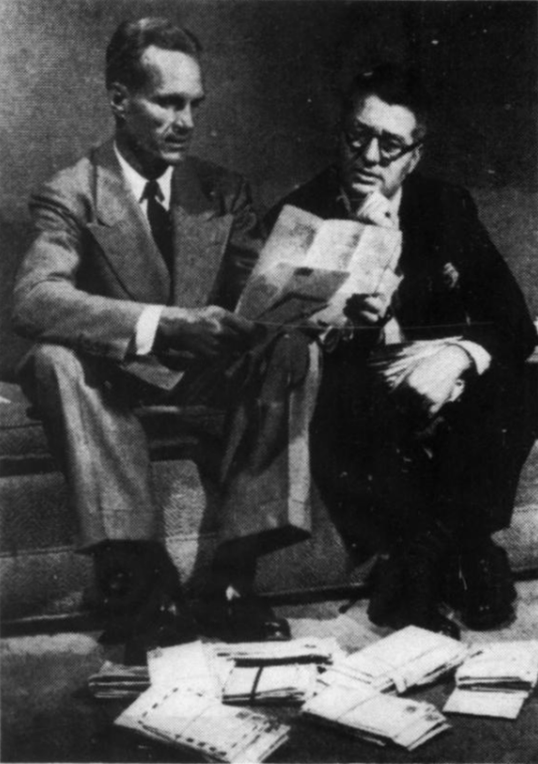
Harry Steeger, the founder of Popular Publications, and Jerry Mason, from 1949 to 1953 the editor of Argosy

By the end of 1943, the policy had changed back to include feature articles again as well as fiction. This made Argosy a competitor with slick general men's magazines such as True. The publisher, Harry Steeger, later explained the reason for the change of focus, arguing that women had been the primary target for advertisers before World War II, but afterwards "new buying pursuits were adopted by the male and it began to be recognized by the advertising agencies that the male was an individual to be reckoned with in the purchase of all types of products ...". The non-fiction material was mostly written in-house; in 1950 Argosy rejected over 99% of the unsolicited non-fiction manuscripts it received.

After Argosy was acquired by Popular Publications, less science fiction appeared for a couple of years. Exceptions included some of Walter R. Brooks' Mr. Ed stories. The late 1940s saw more science fiction again, with stories by Nelson Bond, A. Bertram Chandler, and Robert A. Heinlein, whose "Gentlemen, Be Seated!" appeared in the May 1948 issue, and in the 1950s Argosy published work by Ray Bradbury, Arthur C. Clarke, and Philip José Farmer. In 1977 one of Argosy's special issues was devoted to science fiction; the stories in it were all reprinted from Popular's Super Science Stories, rather than from earlier issues of Argosy.

In September 1948 Erle Stanley Gardner began a true-crime column in Argosy called "The Court of Last Resort". Gardner enlisted assistance from professional experts to examine the cases of dozens of convicts who maintained their innocence after their appeals were exhausted. The column ran for ten years, ending in October 1958, and was adapted for television as a 26-episode series by NBC. Many of the convictions were eventually overturned.

== Assessment ==
John Clute, discussing the American pulp magazines in the first two decades of the twentieth century, has described The Argosy and its companion The All-Story as "the most important pulps of their era." In the era before the Second World War, Argosy was regarded as one of the "Big Four" pulp magazines, along with Blue Book, Adventure and Short Stories. In the early 1960s Theodore Peterson, a magazine historian, considered the slick incarnation of Argosy, along with True, to be "the best magazines of their kind". Peterson suggests that it was the success of these two magazines that led to the expansion of the men's magazine market during the 1950s.

== Additional bibliographic details ==
=== Titles ===
Argosy's title changed many times, either in an attempt to attract more readers, or because of mergers with other magazines.

Title	Issue dates	Notes
The Golden Argosy	December 9, 1882 – November 24, 1888	
The Argosy	December 1, 1888 – January 18, 1919	Shortened to avoid the implication that it was a children's magazine.
The Argosy and Railroad Man's Magazine	January 25, 1919 – May 24, 1919	Merged with The Railroad Man's Magazine.
Argosy	May 31, 1919 – July 17, 1920	
Argosy All-Story Weekly	July 24, 1920 – September 28, 1929	Merged with All-Story Weekly.
Argosy	October 5, 1929 – February 21, 1942	Often Argosy Weekly on the cover, but just Argosy on the masthead.
The New Argosy	March 7, 1942 – July 1942	Part of an attempt to improve circulation.
Argosy	August 1942 – March/April 2004	
Argosy Quarterly	Spring 2005	
Argosy	Fall 2016	

=== Reprint magazines and anthologies ===
The long history of Argosy meant that by the 1930s there were many stories readers had heard of but could no longer obtain. In response to reader requests, Munsey launched Famous Fantastic Mysteries in 1939 to reprint old stories from both Argosy and All-Story Weekly. The following year Munsey launched Fantastic Novels, another reprint magazine, to make longer stories available without needing to serialize them in Famous Fantastic Mysteries. Fantastic Novels lasted only five issues before being discontinued in 1941, but Famous Fantastic Mysteries lasted for 81 issues, ceasing publication with the June 1953 issue. Popular brought back Fantastic Novels for another 20 issues between 1948 and 1951, and also produced five issues of A. Merritt's Fantasy Magazine, also as a reprint venue for stories from the old Munsey magazines, between 1949 and 1950.

In 1976 Popular published two anthology magazines of stories, mostly science fiction and fantasy, titled The Best of Argosy Annual, though only some of the stories included had originally appeared in Argosy. A collection of science fiction stories from the early years of The Argosy was edited by Gene Christie and published in 2010, titled The Space Annihilator and Other Early Science Fiction From the Argosy.

There was a Canadian reprint edition; the first and last known issues were dated April 21, 1924, and July 1960.

== See also ==
- Works originally published in Argosy

== Sources ==
- Abbott, Richard (December 1942). "Editor's note". Writer's Digest. XXIII (2): 6.
- Anonymous (November 29, 1882). "Home Personals: Here and There About Home Folks". Sun-Journal. Lewiston, Maine. p. 3.
- Anonymous (December 31, 1925). "Museum Gets Bulk of Munsey Estate; Papers to be Sold". The New York Times. pp. 1, 5.
- Anonymous (July 1931). "The Author & Journalist's Literary Market Tips Gathered Monthly from Authoritative Sources". The Author & Journalist. 16 (3): 18–24.
- Anonymous (August 1934). "The Author & Journalist's Literary Market Tips Gathered Monthly from Authoritative Sources". The Author & Journalist. 19 (8): 16–20.
- Anonymous (July 1937). "Writer's Market". Writer's Digest. XVII (8): 56–64.
- Anonymous (January 5, 1942). "A Recommissioned Argosy". Newsweek. XIX (1): 50.
- Anonymous (September 28, 1942). "Advertising News". The New York Times.
- Anonymous (July 1943). "'You'll Be Sorry!': The 'Take It or Leave It' audience acclaims the sixty-four dollar question" (PDF). Tune In. pp. 23–25.
- Anonymous (August 23, 1943). "All-Fiction Slick". Newsweek. XXII (8): 91.
- Anonymous (September 1943). "Writer's Market". Writer's Digest. XXIII (7): 7.
- Anonymous (June 14, 1948). "The Golden Fleece". Newsweek. XXXI (24): 61.
- Anonymous (September 19, 1949). "For Men Only". Newsweek. XXXIV (12): 58.
- Anonymous (May 1953). "New York Market Letter". Writer's Digest. 33 (6): 42–49.
- Anonymous (May 17, 1954). "New Argosy Crew". Newsweek. XLIII (20): 62.
- Anonymous (June 1954). "NYC Markets Popping Hot and Cold Stop Big News at Both Ends!". Writer's Digest. 34 (7): 13–23.
- Ashley, Mike (1985). "The Argosy and All-Story". In Tymn, Marshall B. & Ashley, Mike (eds.). Science Fiction, Fantasy and Weird Fiction Magazines. Westport, Connecticut: Greenwood Press. pp. 103–108. ISBN 0-313-21221-X.
- Ashley, Mike (2000). The Time Machines: The Story of the Science-Fiction Pulp Magazines from the beginning to 1950. Liverpool: Liverpool University Press. ISBN 0-85323-865-0.
- Barbas, Samantha (December 1, 2018). "The Esquire Case: A Lost Free Speech Landmark". William and Mary Bill of Rights Journal. 27 (2): 287–361.
- Bedford-Jones, H. (December 1932). "The Plagiarist". Writer's Digest. XIII (1): 35–36.
- Bittner, A.H. (July 1928). "The Writer's Market: Literary Publications: Argosy All-Story Weekly". Writer's Digest. VIII (8): 39, 42.
- Bradfield, Harriet A. (May 1936). "New York Market Notes". Writer's Digest. XVI (6): 20–23.
- Bradfield, Harriet A. (March 1937). "New York Market Notes". Writer's Digest. XVII (4): 19–23.
- Bradfield, Harriet A. (June 1939). "New York Market Letter". Writer's Digest. 19 (7): 35–37, 48–49.
- Bradfield, Harriet A. (July 1939). "New York Market Letter". Writer's Digest. 19 (8): 17–22.
- Bradfield, Harriet A. (March 1942). "New York and Boston Market Letters". Writer's Digest. XXII (4): 26–31.
- Bradfield, Harriet A. (December 1943). "New York Market Letters". Writer's Digest. XXIV (1): 20–24, 61–62.
- Bradfield, Harriet A. (September 1942). "New York Market Letter". Writer's Digest. XXII (10): 13–18.
- Bradfield, Harriet A. (September 1948). "New York Market Letter". Writer's Digest. 28 (10): 40–45.
- Britt, George (1972) [1935]. Forty Years—Forty Millions. Port Washington, New York: Kennikat Press. ISBN 0-8046-1513-6.
- Byrne, John F. (March 1937). "Writer's Market: Pulp Paper Magazines: Argosy". Writer's Digest. XVII (4): 60.
- Deutsch, Keith Alan (2010). "Introduction". In Penzler, Otto (ed.). The Black Lizard Big Book of Black Mask Stories. San Diego, California: Vintage Books. pp. xi–xix. ISBN 978-0-307-45543-7.
- Clareson, Thomas D. (1985a). "Famous Fantastic Mysteries". In Tymn, Marshall B. & Ashley, Mike (eds.). Science Fiction, Fantasy and Weird Fiction Magazines. Westport, Connecticut: Greenwood Press. pp. 211–216. ISBN 0-313-21221-X.
- Clareson, Thomas D. (1985b). "Fantastic Novels". In Tymn, Marshall B. & Ashley, Mike (eds.). Science Fiction, Fantasy and Weird Fiction Magazines. Westport, Connecticut: Greenwood Press. pp. 241–244. ISBN 0-313-21221-X.
- Clute, John (1995). Science Fiction: The Illustrated Encyclopedia. New York: Dorling Kindersley Publishing, Inc. ISBN 0-7894-0185-1.
- Compaine, Benjamin M. (1982). The Business of Consumer Magazines. Purchase, New York: Knowledge Industry Publications. ISBN 978-0-86729-020-2.
- Cox, J. Randolph (2000). The Dime Novel Companion: A Source Book. Westport, Connecticut: Greenwood Press. ISBN 0-313-25674-8.
- Deutsch, Keith Alan (2010). "Introduction". In Penzler, Otto (ed.). The Black Lizard Big Book of Black Mask Stories. San Diego, California: Vintage Books. pp. xi–xix. ISBN 978-0-307-45543-7.
- Dougherty, Philip H. (October 25, 1977). "Advertising: Challenging the F.T.C.'s Taboos". The New York Times. p. 74.
- Dougherty, Philip H. (January 13, 1978). "Advertising: Publishers and Revenues". The New York Times. p. 74.
- Ellis, Douglas (2017a). "Introduction: The Birth of the Pulps". In Ellis, Douglas; Hulse, Ed & Weinberg, Robert (eds.). The Art of the Pulps: An Illustrated History. San Diego, California: Elephant Book Company. pp. 8–11. ISBN 978-1-68405-091-8.
- Freeman, Nick (2016). "Cabell, James Branch". In Hughes, William; Punter, David & Smith, Andrew (eds.). The Encyclopedia of the Gothic. Chichester, UK: John Wiley and Sons Ltd. pp. 103–105. ISBN 978-1-119-06460-2.
- Hardin, Nils (July 1977). "An Interview with Henry Steeger". Xenophile (33): 3–18.
- Hulse, Ed (2013). The Blood 'N' Thunder Guide to Pulp Fiction. Morris Plains, New Jersey: Murania Press. ISBN 978-1-4910-1093-8.
- Ingham, John N. (1983). Biographical Dictionary of American Business Leaders: Volume 2. Westport, Connecticut: Greenwood Press. ISBN 0-313-23908-8.
- Lewis, Howard J. (May 1953). "Letter". Writer's Digest. 33 (6): 1.
- Litvag, Irving (1977). The Master of Sunnybank, a Biography of Albert Payson Terhune. New York: Harper & Row. ISBN 978-0-06-126350-7.
- Mayer, Geoff (2012). Historical Dictionary of Crime Films. Lanham, Maryland: The Scarecrow Press. ISBN 978-0-8108-6769-7.
- Moonan, Willard (1990). "Argosy". In Nourie, Alan; Nourie, Barbara (eds.). American Mass-Market Magazines. Westport, Connecticut: Greenwood Press. pp. 29–32. ISBN 0-313-25254-8.
- Moore, Don (July 1931). "Letter". Writer's Digest. XI (8): 5.
- Moore, Don (July 1932). "The Writer's Market: General, Literary and Fiction: Argosy". Writer's Digest. XII (8): 54.
- Moore, Don (February 1933). "Letter". Writer's Digest. XIII (3): 47.
- Moring, Matthew (Fall 2016). "Masthead". Argosy. 389 (5): 2. ISBN 9781618272843.
- Moskowitz, Sam (1968). "Introduction: A History of Science Fiction in the Popular Magazines, 1891–1911". In Moskowitz, Sam (ed.). Science Fiction by Gaslight: A History and Anthology of Science Fiction in the Popular Magazines, 1891–1911. Cleveland, Ohio: The World Publishing Company. pp. 15–50. OCLC 1330798369.
- Moskowitz, Sam (1970). "A History of the Scientific Romance in the Munsey Magazines, 1912–1920". In Moskowitz, Sam (ed.). Under the Moons of Mars: A History and Anthology of the Scientific Romance in the Munsey Magazines, 1912–1920. New York: Holt, Rinehart and Winston. pp. 289–433. ISBN 0-03-081858-3.
- Moskowitz, Sam (1974) [1966]. Seekers of Tomorrow. Westport, Connecticut: Hyperion. ISBN 0-88355-158-6.
- Moskowitz, Sam (1976). Strange Horizons. New York: Charles Scribner's Sons. ISBN 0-684-14774-2.
- Mott, Frank Luther (1957a). A History of American Magazines: 1850–1865. Cambridge Massachusetts: Harvard University Press. OCLC 867369705.
- Mott, Frank Luther (1957b). A History of American Magazines: 1885–1905. Cambridge, Massachusetts: Harvard University Press. OCLC 228067774.
- Munsey, Frank A. (May 1898). "Getting On In Journalism". Munsey's Magazine. 19 (2): 214–224.
- Munsey, Frank A. (October 1902). "Impressions by the Way". Munsey's Magazine. XXVIII (1): 153–155.
- Munsey, Frank A. (1907). The Story of the Founding and Development of the Munsey Publishing-House. New York: The De Vinne Press. OCLC 7003678.
- Osborne, William Hamilton (1921). "William Hamilton Osborne". In Burgess, Gelett (ed.). My Maiden Effort: Being the Personal Confessions of Well-known American Authors as to Their Literary Beginnings. Garden City, New York: Doubleday, Page & Company. pp. 185–188. OCLC 407763.
- Peterson, Theodore (1972) [1964]. Magazines in the Twentieth Century (2nd ed.). Urbana, Illinois: University of Illinois Press. ISBN 0-252-72537-9.
- Raine, William MacLeod (1921). "William MacLeod Raine". In Burgess, Gelett (ed.). My Maiden Effort: Being the Personal Confessions of Well-known American Authors as to Their Literary Beginnings. Garden City, New York: Doubleday, Page & Company. pp. 200–201. OCLC 407763.
- Sanders, Joe (1985). "A. Merritt's Fantasy Magazine". In Tymn, Marshall B. & Ashley, Mike (eds.). Science Fiction, Fantasy and Weird Fiction Magazines. Westport, Connecticut: Greenwood Press. pp. 3–6. ISBN 0-313-21221-X.
- Server, Lee (1993). Danger is My Business. San Francisco: Chronicle Books. ISBN 0-8118-0112-8.
- Server, Lee (2002). Encyclopedia of Pulp Fiction Writers. New York: Checkmark Books. ISBN 0-8160-4578-X.
- Stone, Albert William (2007). "Meeting the Editors in Person". In Locke, John (ed.). Pulpwood Days Volume 1: Editors You Want to Know. Elkhorn, California: Off-Trail Publications. pp. 15–53. ISBN 978-0-9786836-2-7.
- Terrill, Rogers (December 1942). "Letter". Writer's Digest. XXIII (2): 6.
- Thomas, Ward (October 1935). "Mice or Men?". Writer's Digest. XV (11): 31–35.
- Weinberg, Robert (1988). A Biographical Dictionary of Science Fiction and Fantasy Artists. Westport, Connecticut: Greenwood Press. ISBN 0-313-24349-2.
- Whitman, Alden (April 28, 1970). "Gypsy Rose Lee Memorial Service Tomorrow". The New York Times. p. 41.
- Whipple, Chandler (July 1939). "Letter". Writer's Digest. 19 (8): 2.
