= Isabel Ostrander =

American writer

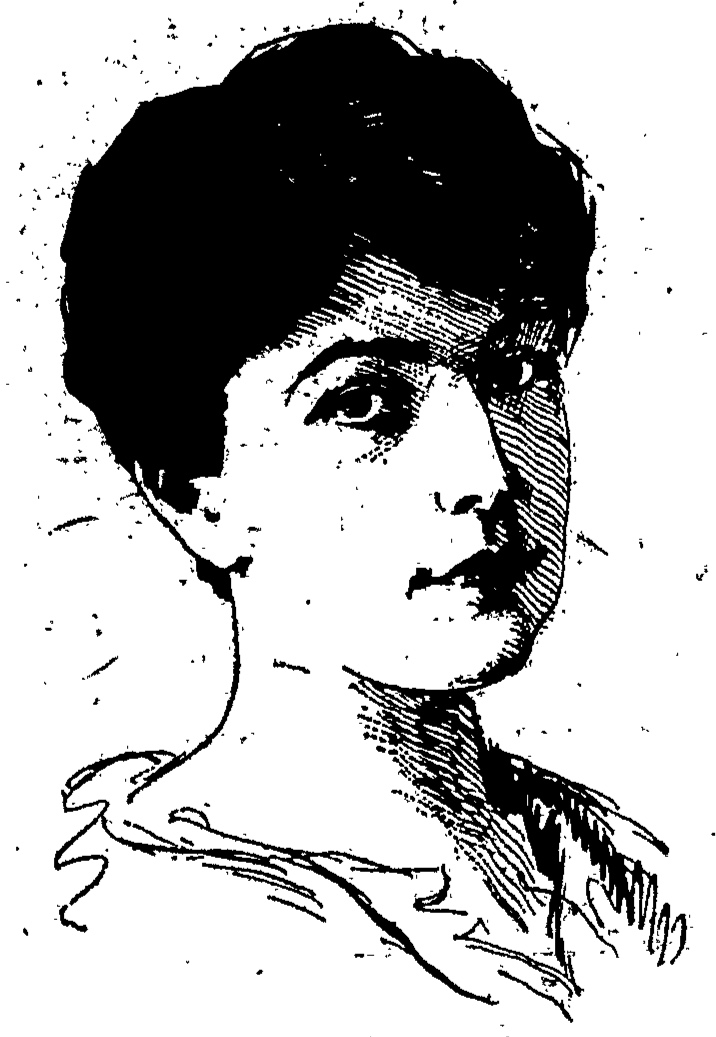
- Born: Isabel Egenton Ostrander; 1883
- Died: 1924 (aged 40–41)

Isabel Egenton Ostrander (1883–1924) was an American mystery writer of the early twentieth century who used her own name and the pseudonyms Robert Orr Chipperfield, David Fox, and Douglas Grant. Christopher B. Booth is falsely credited as a pseudonym of hers.

== Early life ==
She was born in New York City to Thomas E Ostrander and Harriet Elizabeth Bradbrook. Her Ostrander pedigree goes back to seventeenth-century Kingston, New York.

== First Blind Detective ==
In the discussions of which writer invented the blind detective, Ostrander is one of the candidates.

The first book publication of her Damon Gaunt is a 1915 novel At One-Thirty, but there might be a misplaced earlier short story: periodical publication of many mystery short story writers is often lost or partial. For example, blind detective Thornley Colton appeared in some short stories in People's Ideal Fiction Magazine in early 1913 that weren't collected in book form until 1915, while Max Carrados by Ernest Bramah reached the periodicals in 1913, but anthologization in 1914. In no case is bibliography complete for periodicals, and either might be the first, though Max Carrados was the first in book publication.

== Agatha Christie parodies ==
In the 1920s, Ostrander was notable enough that Agatha Christie parodied Ostrander's work in Christie's Tommy and Tuppence short stories, anthologized in Partners in Crime. We find Tommy and Tuppence modeling their detective skills after Ostrander's characters, ex-Roundsman Timothy McCarty and his friend Dennis Riordan.

== Personal life ==
Ostrander married songwriter Arthur J. Lamb in June 1907 and filed for divorce 11 months later.

Ostrander died of heart disease in Long Beach, NY, on April 26, 1924.

== Works ==
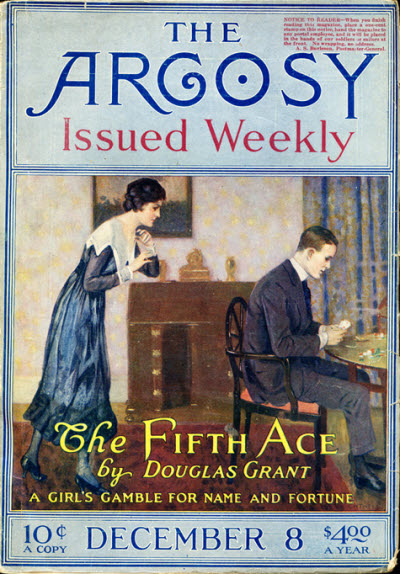
The "Douglas Grant" novel The Fifth Ace was serialized in The Argosy in 1917

- "The One Who Knew," The All-Story, Oct, Nov, Christmas 1911, Jan, Feb 1912
- "The Heritage of Cain," The Cavalier, Mar 30, Apr 6, Apr 13, Apr 20, Apr 27, May 4, May 11, 1912
- "The Affair Across the Street," The Cavalier, Sep 13, Sep 20 1913
- "Eyes That Saw Not" [Damon Gaunt], The Cavalier, Feb 14, Feb 21, Feb 28, Mar 7 1914
- "The Man Who Died," All-Story Cavalier Weekly, Dec 12 1914
- At One-Thirty, a Damon Gaunt novel, Grosset, 1915
- Ostrander, Isabel (1915). The Primal Law. Mitchell Kennerley – via Google Books.
- The Clue in the Air: A Detective Story. W. J. Watt & Co. 1917 – via Google Books.
- "The Crevice" [with William J. Burns], The Blue Book Magazine, Jan, May, Jun, Jul 1915
- "Mystery of the Poison Pen," All-Story Weekly, May 5, May 12, 1917
- "Between Heaven and Earth," All-Story Weekly, Jun 9, Jul 7 1917
- "The Fifth Ace," The Argosy, Dec 15 1917 as Douglas Grant
- "Suspense, " All-Story Weekly, Apr 6, Apr 13, Apr 20, Apr 27 1918
- "Booty," The Argosy, Nov 16 1918 as Douglas Grant
- The Island of Intrigue, novel, 1918, basis for the 1919 film, The Island of Intrigue
- Ostrander, Isabel (1918). The Red Glove. Grosset & Dunlap., basis for the 1919 film serial, The Red Glove, directed by J. P. McGowan, written by Isabel Ostrander and Hope Loring
- "The Twenty-Six Clues", novel, Grosset & Dunlap, 1919,
- "The Single Trace, Argosy, Sep 13 1919 as Douglas Grant
- Ostrander, Isabel (1919). The Single Track. Grosset & Dunlap – via Google Books.
- "Ashes to Ashes," All-Story Weekly, Sep 27, Oct 4, Oct 18, Oct 25, Nov 1 1919
- "Anything Once," Argosy, Apr 10 1920 as Douglas Grant
- "The Shadowers / 1: The Man Who Convicted Himself," All-Story Weekly, May 1, May 8, 1920 as David Fox.
- Unseen Hands. Robert M. McBride & Company. 1920 – via Google Books.
- "How Many Cards?," Argosy All-Story Weekly, Aug 7 1920
- The Crimson Blotter. Robert M. McBride. 1921.
- The Man in the Jury Box. Robert M. McBride. 1921 – via Google Books.
- McCarty Incog. Robert M. McBride. 1922 – via Google Books.
- "Two-Gun Sue," Argosy All-Story Weekly, Mar 4 1922 as Douglas Grant
- "Above Suspicion," Argosy All-Story Weekly, Nov 11, Nov 18, Nov 25, Dec 2, Dec 9, Dec 16 1922 as Robert Orr Chipperfield
- "The Doom Dealer," Argosy All-Story Weekly, Mar 24 1923 as David Fox.
- "Annihilation," Argosy All-Story Weekly, Nov 17, Nov 24, Dec 22, Dec 29 1923
- "Bright Lights," Argosy All-Story Weekly, Dec 22, Dec 29 1923 as Robert Orr Chipperfield
- "Liberation, " Argosy All-Story Weekly, Jul 19 1924
- Ostrander, Isabel (1924). Dust to Dust. Robert M. McBride – via Google Books.
- Ostrander, Isabel (1925). The Neglected Clue. Robert M. McBride – via Google Books.
- Ostrander, Isabel (1925). Impulse. Hurst & Blackett – via Google Books.
- The Sleeping Cat, A. L. Burt, 1926. Coachwhip Publications, 2024.
- The Mathematics of Guilt, McBride, 1926
