= William Dewart =

William Dewart may refer to:

- William Lewis Dewart (1821–1888), American politician
- William Thompson Dewart (1875–1944), American publisher
