= Golden Days for Boys and Girls =

- Categories: Children's
- Frequency: Weekly
- First issue: March 6, 1860
- Final issue: May 11, 1907
- Country: United States
- Based in: Pennsylvania
- Language: English

Golden Days for Boys and Girls was a late 19th-century children's story paper, distributed weekly as an accompaniment to the paper Saturday Night. Running from March 6, 1880, to May 11, 1907, Golden Days cost subscribers $3 a year. It was the brainchild of newspaperman James Elverson (1838–1911), who later owned the Philadelphia Inquirer.

The first printing of this paper had an output of three million copies, and by the second number, had 52,000 subscribers. According to a newspaper advertisement in 1885, the 16 page weekly had a circulation above 70,000 by this year. Another ad circa 1888 puts the number somewhere between 110,000 and 120,000 weekly sales, being distributed from coast to coast in the United States.

Golden Days featured stories, activities and lessons which were mostly gender-specific, with separate stories appealing to boys and girls. Many of the stories were serialized over several issues; a measure designed to drive increased weekly sales. The themes largely involved school, athletics, westerns and the frontier, travel, exploration, adventure, the sea, and success stories. The paper also included a weekly puzzle page, Puzzledom; a section for advice and responses to the young readers, the Letter Box; and a weekly Bible lesson and devotional titled "International Lessons", provided by such persons as Rev. D. P. Kidder, D. D. and Rev C. E. Strobridge, D. D. Certainly, this paper's contents catered to parents and clergymen, offering alternative material to the violence and debauchery of the 'blood and thunder' dime novels, such as those published by Frank Tousey and Norman Munro.

== List of authors ==
This is not a fully comprehensive list of authors.

- Horatio Alger, Jr.
- L. E. Bailey
- William Perry Brown
- Wilton Burton
- Harry Castlemon
- William Pendleton Chipman
- Frank H. Converse
- George H. Coomer
- John Russell Coryell
- John W. Davidson
- Edward S. Ellis
- W. Bert Foster
- William Murray Graydon
- Edward Greey
- Charles H. Heustis
- Fred E. Janette
- Dr. Willard Mackenzie
- L.M. Montgomery
- Emma A. Opper
- Oliver Optic
- James Otis Kaler
- Celia Pearse
- St. George Rathborne
- Evelyn Raymond
- Victor St. Clair
- Edward Shippen, M.D.
- James H. Smith
- Frank R. Stockton
- Edward Stratemeyer
- Rose Hartwick Thorpe
- Mary T. Waggaman
- Matthew White, Jr.
- John H. Whitson
- Fannie Williams
- Ernest A. Yong
