= The Island of Intrigue =

1919 silent film directed by Henry Otto

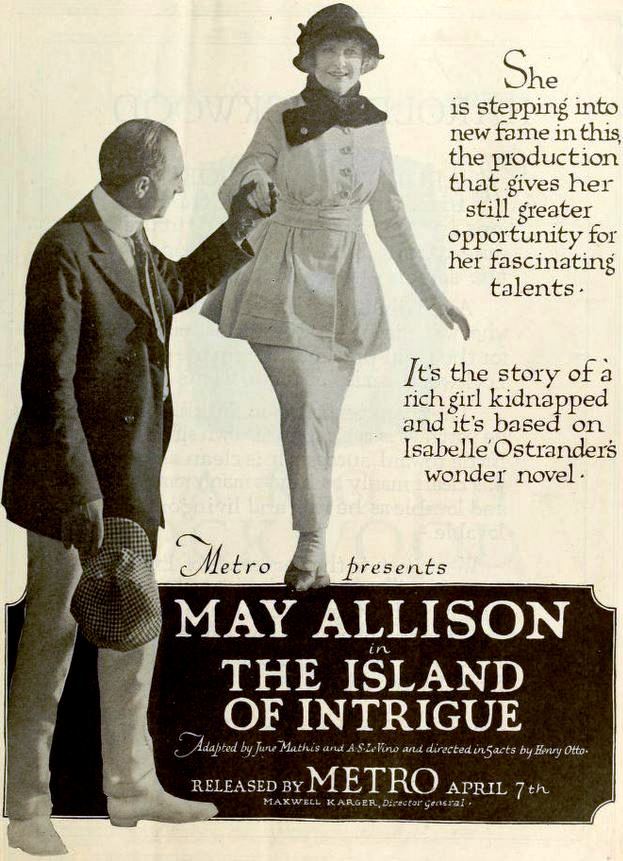
- Advertisement
- Directed by: Henry Otto
- Written by: A. S. Le Vino; June Mathis
- Based on: the novel, The Island of Intrigue by Isabel Ostrander
- Produced by: Maxwell Karger
- Starring: May Allison; Jack Mower; Frederick Vroom
- Cinematography: William E. Fildew
- Production company: Metro Pictures
- Release date: April 7, 1919 (US)
- Running time: 5 reels
- Country: United States
- Language: Silent (English intertitles)

The Island of Intrigue is a lost 1919 American silent drama film, directed by Henry Otto. It stars May Allison, Jack Mower, and Frederick Vroom, and was released on April 7, 1919.

== Cast list ==
- May Allison as Maida Waring
- Jack Mower as Gilbert Spear
- Frederick Vroom as Thomas Waring
- Lucille Ward as Mrs. Juliet Smith
- Gordon Marr as Alaric Smith
- Lillian West as Yorna Smith
- Hector Sarno as Count Pellessier
- Tom Kennedy as Jackson, the butler
- Chance Ward as Mr. Gobel
- Edward Alexander as Jones, a sailor
