= Garret Smith =

Science fiction writer and journalist

Garret Smith (1878–1954) was an American journalist and science fiction writer. Most of his works were short stories or magazine novels. Many of his works appeared in the Argosy.

During his lifetime one of his serialized novels was released as book (Between Worlds, 1929, originally serialized in 1910). Between Worlds, a book about women from dystopian Venus attempting to conquer Earth, is not considered his best work by modern critics (it has been described as "a semi-juvenile tale" and "one of his weakest" in The Encyclopedia of Science Fiction). Instead, another novel he wrote received more recognition (The Treasures of Tantalus, 2017, originally serialized in 1920). That story featured a relatively novel concept of a device to see through time and space, and some discussion of morality of their use. The Encyclopedia noted that The Treasures of Tantalus, was "of more interest", and Michael Ashley called it "praiseworthy".

Other of his works included "On the Brink of 2000" (1910) and "You've Killed Privacy" (1928), also featuring the devices for seeing through time and space; Flammarion-inspired "After a Million Years" (1919) tackling the topic of the extinction of humanity, "The Girl in the Moon" (1928) about a runaway rocket ship, and "Thirty Years Late" (1928), the latter called by Brian M. Stableford "a transfiguration of the tale of Rip van Winkle".

Summing up his career as a writer, Stableford said that Smith's "ventures into sf were sometimes enterprising", while The Encyclopedia noted that he "was a sometimes capable writer whose ideas tended to outclass his fiction".
