= Jerry Mason (editor) =

American pulp magazine editor

Jerry Mason (born April 6, 1913) was a pulp magazine editor. He was born in Baltimore, and attended Baltimore City College in 1930. He attended Johns Hopkins, graduating in 1933. He worked in advertising and as a writer, and then became associate editor of This Week. He was hired by Popular Publications in April 1949 and edited Argosy and Adventure.

He married Rees Finger, a ballet teacher, in about 1935. They had a son, Mike, born in about 1940.

== Sources ==
- Galanoy, I. T. (February 1952). "Jerry Mason of Argosy and Adventure". Writer's Digest. 33: 13–21, 70.
