= Waldron Baily =

American novelist

Dykeman Waldron Baily (July 1, 1871 - 1953) was a businessman and writer. His novel The Heart of the Blue Ridge was adapted into a silent film. Baily established Baily Manufacturing Company, a locust wood pin and cross arm manufacturing business in Elkin, North Carolina. He also owned the Baily Chair Company. Many of his books are set in North Carolina locations including Bogue Banks, North Carolina's Piedmont region and Wilkes County, North Carolina.

Baily was born in Mount Kisco, New York. He served as mayor of Elkin.

== Bibliography ==
- Heart of the Blue Ridge, W.J. Watt and Co., New York City (1915), illustrated by Douglas Duer
- The Homeward Trail (1916), illustrated by George William Gage
- When the Cock Crows, Bedford Publishing Co., New York City (1918), illustrated by George W. Gage
- June Gold, W. J. Watt and Co., New York City (1922), frontispiece by Paul Stahr
- Autobiography; the Life of the Novelist and Politician from North Carolina (1958)
