= Clinton H. Stagg =

American novelist

- Born: Clinton Holland Stagg; November 1888; Newark, New Jersey, United States
- Died: May 3, 1916 (aged 27); Santa Monica, California, United States
- Occupations: Author, Screenwriter
- Writing career
- Genre: Mystery fiction
- Notable works: Silver Sandals (1916); High Speed (1916); Thornley Colton, Blind Reader of Hearts (1915)

Clinton Holland Stagg (November 1888 – May 3, 1916) was an American screenwriter, journalist, and author.

== Career as an author ==
Stagg created the fictional sleuth Thornley Colton, known as Problemist, the genre's first blind detective living in New York City in the early 20th century. The independently wealthy Colton relies on his intelligence and superb senses, honed due to his blindness, and takes only the most difficult cases for the sheer pleasure of solving mysteries, often clashing with the NYPD along the way.

The Problemist series includes 8 short stories and the novel Silver Sandals (New York : W. J. Watt & Company, 1916). The short stories were published in Thornley Colton, Blind Reader of Hearts (London: Simpkin, Marshall, Hamilton, Kent & Company: 1915.) Stagg also authored the novel High Speed (New York : W. J. Watt & Company, 1916.)

Stagg was employed by a newspaper in Newark, New Jersey, wrote numerous short stories and magazine articles, and later became a screenwriter of 'photoplays' during Hollywood's early era.

== Career as a screenwriter ==
In Hollywood, Stagg was employed by the Famous Players–Lasky Corporation and the Thanhouser Company (later the Thanhouser Film Corporation, which operated until 1918).

Stagg's filmography includes:

1916 A Gutter Magdalene (scenario / as Clinton H. Stagg)

1916 The Carriage of Death (short) (scenario / as Clinton H. Stagg)

1916 The Race (scenario / as Clinton Stagg)

1916 The Fifth Ace (short) (scenario / as Clinton H. Stagg)

1916 The Whispered Word (short) (story / as Clinton H. Stagg)

1916 The Reunion (short) (story / as Clinton H. Stagg)

1916 The Spirit of the Game (short) (scenario / as Clinton H. Stagg)

1916 The Knotted Cord (short) (scenario / as Clinton H. Stagg)

1916 The Burglars' Picnic (short) (scenario / as Clinton H. Stagg)

1916 In the Name of the Law (short) (scenario / as Clinton H. Stagg)

Two of Stagg's works, the novel High Speed (1916) and his short story "Teeth" (published posthumously in the defunct People's Magazine, 22:1-74, February 1917), were dramatized after his death in the films High Speed (1920) and the Tom Mix vehicle Teeth (1924).

== Death ==
Stagg was killed along with his friend, writer Malcolm Strong, when the automobile he was driving overturned on a rural road in Santa Monica, California, near Los Angeles. According to The New York Times of May 5, 1916: "The loss of a front tire caused the accident. The automobile ran into a pole and overturned, pinning Strong and Stagg under it." Stagg's friend, Thanhouser director George Foster Platt, was hospitalized after the wreck, but survived.
