= The Wilderness Trail =

1919 film

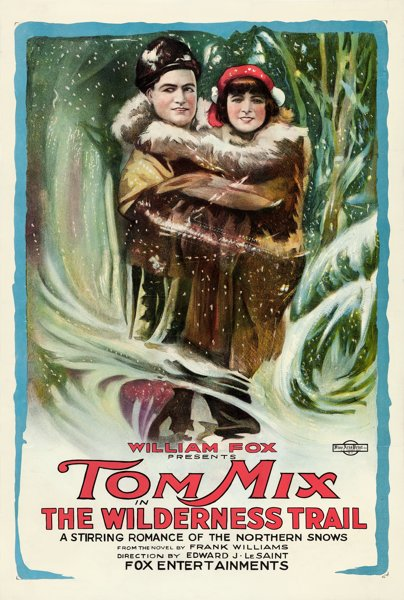
- Directed by: Edward J. Le Saint
- Written by: Charles Kenyon (scenario)
- Based on: The Wilderness Trail by Francis William Sullivan
- Starring: Tom Mix; Colleen Moore; Frank Clark
- Cinematography: Friend F. Baker
- Distributed by: Fox Film Corporation
- Release date: July 6, 1919
- Running time: 50 minutes
- Country: United States
- Languages: Silent; English intertitles

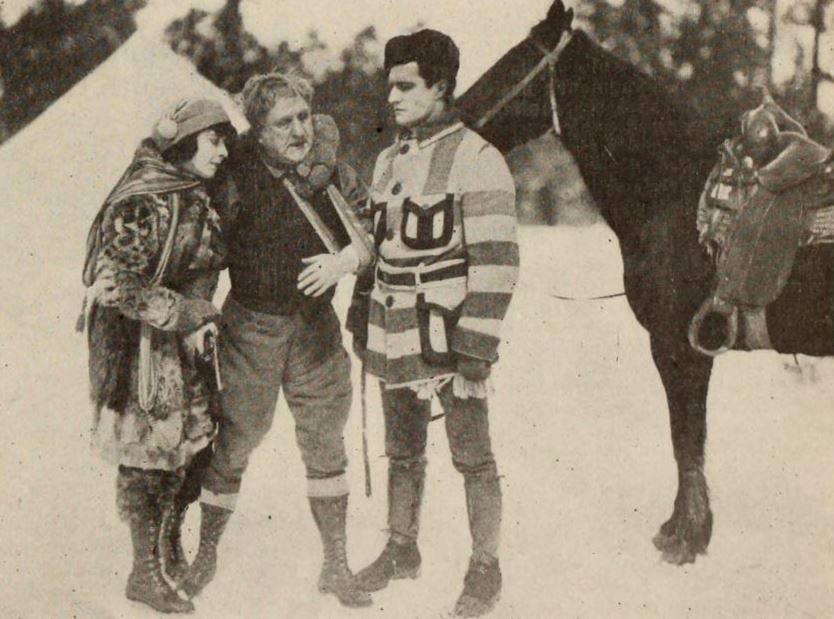
Still with Colleen Moore, Frank Clark, and Tom Mix

The Wilderness Trail is a 1919 American silent Western film directed by Edward J. Le Saint and starring Tom Mix and Colleen Moore. It was one of the first of two films that featured Mix and Moore. The Wilderness Trail is based on the 1913 Western novel of the same name by Francis William Sullivan and was adapted for the screen by Charles Kenyon.

No prints of The Wilderness Trail are known to exist and the film is now presumed lost.

== Plot ==
Set in the Northwoods of Canada, Tom Mix stars as Donald MacTavish, the newly appointed head commissioner of the Hudson's Bay Company. This promotion infuriates MacTavish's rival Angus Fitzpatrick (Frank Clark) who wanted the job. Angus Fitzpatrick takes his anger and resentment out on MacTavish then sets out to get MacTavish fired. Fitzpatrick accuses MacTavish of stealing furs that were actually stolen by a group of thieving traders led by Sergius (Sid Jordan). To complicate matters, both MacTavish and Sergius are in love with Fitzpatrick's young daughter Jeanne (Moore). After Sergius kidnaps Jeanne, Angus Fitzpatrick attempts to rescue his daughter but is injured by the thieving traders. MacTavish rescues Jeanne and the two return home to Angus Fitzpatrick. Fitzpatrick forgives MacTavish and the two work together to catch the group of thieving traders who kidnapped Jeanne.

== Cast ==
- Tom Mix as Donald MacTavish
- Colleen Moore as Jeanne Fitzpatrick
- Frank Clark as Angus Fitzpatrick
- Lule Warrenton as Old Mary
- Sid Jordan as Sergius
- Pat Chrisman as Indian
- Jack Nelson as Half-Breed

== Production ==
The Wilderness Trail was shot in and around Flagstaff, Arizona from February 3 to February 24, 1919. Interior shots were filmed in Los Angeles.

== Reception ==
Variety's review was positive, praising Friend F. Baker's cinematography for the fights and beautiful exterior shots. The reviewer found the plot to be "clear and reasonable" and the acting adequate.

== See also ==
- Tom Mix filmography
