= Lee Server =

American writer (1953–2021)

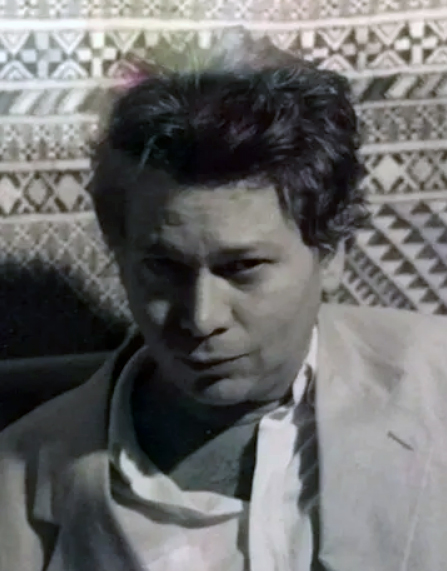
- Server's dust jacket photo
- Born: May 27, 1953; Springfield, Massachusetts, U.S.
- Died: December 28, 2021 (aged 68); Palm Springs, California, U.S.
- Education: New York University
- Occupations: Author; biographer; screenwriter
- Years active: 1987–2021
- Spouse: Terri Hardin

Lee Server (May 27, 1953 – December 28, 2021) was an American writer. He was a graduate of New York University Film School. Server wrote several books about Hollywood cinema and pulp fiction.

== Personal life ==
Server was born on May 27, 1953, in Springfield, Massachusetts. He was married to Terri Hardin. Server died on December 28, 2021, in Palm Springs, California, at the age of 68.

== Career ==
In the mid-1980s, Server set out to interview as many Golden Age Hollywood screenwriters as he could locate. After talking to 23 all-but-forgotten writers about working inside the studio system during the 1930s and '40s, Server selected 12 of the interviews to be published as his first book, Screenwriter: Words Become Pictures. Disgruntled with his contemporaries' tendency to emphasize the director's contributions to the filmmaking process, Server felt that "the time has come to shine a bit more light in the direction of the neglected screenwriter." The Black List's official screenwriting blog has saluted Server's effort, citing Words Become Pictures as one of the 10 most essential books about screenwriting from the perspective of working screenwriters.

Server's book on Ava Gardner, Love is Nothing (2006) was described as an "excellent biography" by Peter Bogdanovich.

On March 20, 2019, Server joined George Noory on the Coast to Coast radio program to discuss his most recent book, Handsome Johnny: The Life and Death of Johnny Rosselli: Gentleman Gangster, Hollywood Producer, CIA Assassin.

== Books ==
- Handsome Johnny: The Life and Death of Johnny Rosselli: Gentleman Gangster, Hollywood Producer, CIA Assassin (2018)
- Ava Gardner: "Love is Nothing" (2006)
- Encyclopedia of Pulp Fiction Writers (2002)
- Robert Mitchum: "Baby, I Don't Care" (2001)
- Encyclopedia of Pulp Fiction Writers (2001)
- Asian Pop Cinema: Bombay to Tokyo (1999)
- The Big Book of Noir (1998)
- Over My Dead Body: The Sensational Age of the American Paperback: 1945-1955 (1994)
- Sam Fuller: Film is a Battleground: A Critical Study, with Interviews, A Filmography, and a Bibliography (1994)
- Danger is My Business: An Illustrated History of the Fabulous Pulp Magazines: 1896-1953 (1993)
- Screenwriter: Words Become Pictures (1987)
