= The Heart of the Blue Ridge =

1915 novel by Dyckman Waldron Baily

The Heart of the Blue Ridge is a novel published in 1915 by Dyckman Waldron Baily, who was a businessman and author in North Carolina. It was adapted into a silent film the same year. The film was directed by James Young and starred his wife Clara Kimball Young and Chester Barnett. Robert W. Cummings and Edwin L. Hollywood were also cast in the film. The film was reissued in 1917 as The Savage Instinct.
