= Francis William Sullivan =

American novelist

Francis William Sullivan (16 February 1887 - 5 March 1963), who wrote with the nom de plume Frank Williams, was an American author. He wrote The Wilderness Trail, published in 1913, a novel about the Hudson Bay area that was illustrated by Douglas Duer. It was made into the film The Wilderness Trail starring Tom Mix. The story was originally published in Photoplay Magazine as Glory Road and was followed by a sequel titled Star of the North.

Norval MacGregor directed the 1919 film version of Sullivan's 1914 novel Child of Banishment.

Sullivan's story The Godson of Jeanette Gontreau was adapted into the 1918 film The Flames of Chance directed by Raymond Wells and starring Margery Wilson.

== Bibliography ==
- The Wilderness Trail illustrated by G. W. Gage (1913)
- Children of Banishment (1914)
- The Free Range
- Harbor of Doubt (1915) Grosset & Dunlap
- Alloy of Gold (1915)
- Star of the North (1916) illustrated by D. C. Hutchison
- The Godson of Jeanette Gontreau in War Stories
