= Douglas Duer =

American painter and illustrator

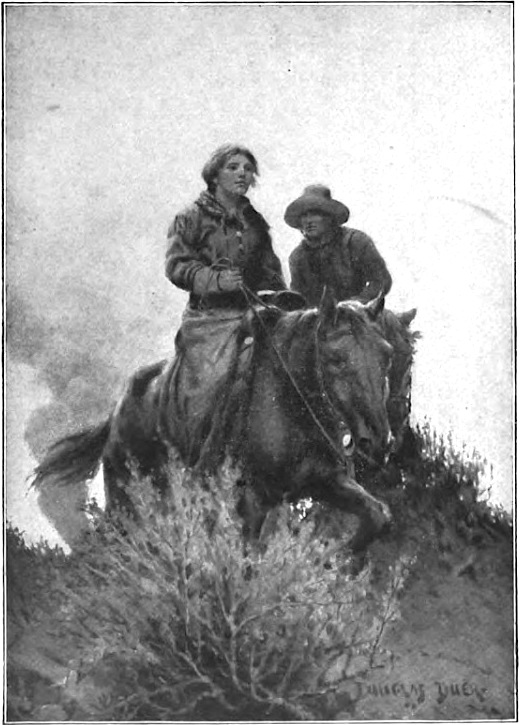
Illustration from Zane Grey's Riders of the Purple Sage

Douglas Duer (October 4, 1887 – 1964) was a painter and illustrator in the United States. He studied with William Merritt Chase and Howard Pyle. Duer worked for various newspapers, illustrated books, did Works Progress Administration assignments during the Great Depression, and created artwork for greeting cards.

Publications with stories he illustrated include Scribners, Harper's, Everybody's Magazine, The American Magazine and Boy's Life.

He exhibited in Wilmington, Delaware in 1917.

Some of his poetry was published.

== Work as illustrator ==
- Told in the Hills (1891) by Marah Ellis Ryan
- Desert Gold (novel) by Zane Grey
- The Wilderness Trail by Frank Williams
- Riders of the Purple Sage by Zane Grey
- Keep the Wagons Moving by West Lathrop, pseudonym for Dorothy West Lathrop
- A siren of the snows by Stanley Shaw
- Two Arabian Knights by Donald McGibeny
- Lizette by Samuel Raphaelson in Everybody's Magazine
- The Great White Wall: A Narrative Poem by William Rose Benét
- The Vanished World by Douglas Duer, Sherman, French & Co. (1916)
- Frontispiece of The Single Track by Douglas Grant (author).
- Walter Reed: Doctor in Uniform by L.N. Wood
