= William Thompson Dewart =

American publisher

William Thompson Dewart (January 29, 1875 – January 27, 1944) was an American publisher.

== Life ==
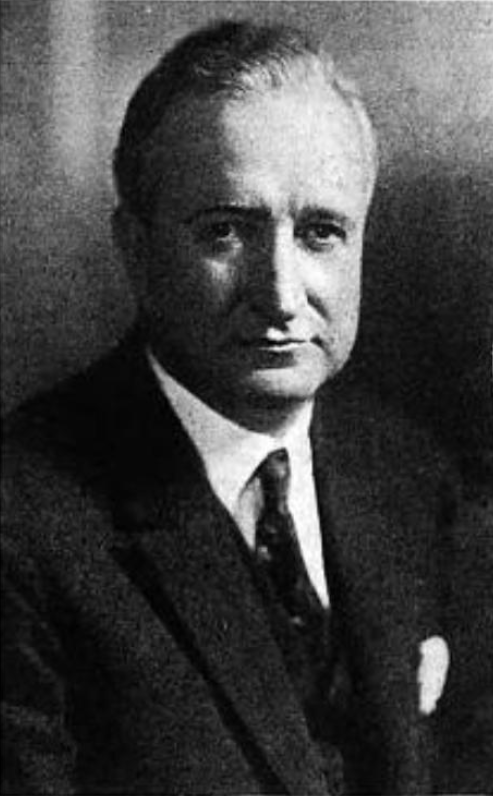
William Dewart

Dewart was born in Fenelon Falls, Ontario, on January 29, 1875, to William Dewart and Jessie Graham. The family moved to Rochester, New York in about 1881. When he was fourteen he began work in a button factory, and later worked in the railroad business, on a wrecking train and later in the machine shops. In 1898 he was hired by Frank Munsey as an office manager, at a wage of $12 per week, at his New London, Connecticut offices, and within eighteen months was made head book-keeper of Munsey's distribution company, The Red Star News Company, and assistant superintendent of the publishing plant. He became general manager of the Frank A. Munsey company in 1903.

When Munsey died in 1925 Dewart was one of the executors of his will, which stipulated that his assets should be turned into cash. Dewart bought the New York Sun from Munsey's estate for $13,000,000 in 1926.

== Personal life ==
Dewart married Mary Louise Wheeler on April 21, 1908, and they had three children: William, Thomas, and Mary. He died on January 27, 1944.

== Sources ==
- Anonymous (January 28, 1944). "Publisher with Alger Story Background Dies". Fort Worth Star-Telegram. p. 10.
- O'Brien, Frank M. (1928). The Story of the Sun: New York: 1833–1928. New York: D. Appleton and Company.
