= William Taylor Adams =

American author and politician (1822–1897)

William Taylor Adams Oliver Optic
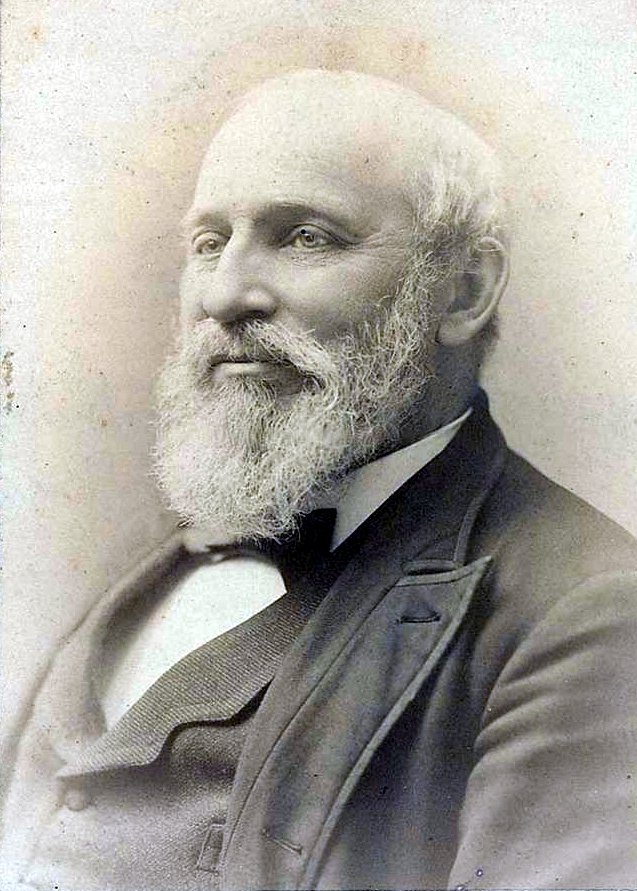
- William T. Adams by Davis & Dow of Boston

Member of the Massachusetts House of Representatives 5th Norfolk District
- In office January 6, 1869 – January 5, 1870
- Succeeded by: Samuel Atherton

Member of the School Committee of Boston, Massachusetts
- In office 1870–1870

Member of the School Committee of the Town of Dorchester, Massachusetts
- In office 1867–1870
- Succeeded by: Office abolished

Personal details
- Born: July 30, 1822 Medway, Massachusetts
- Died: March 27, 1897 (aged 74) Dorchester, Massachusetts
- Spouse: Sarah Jenkins
- Children: Alice Maria Adams, Emma Louisa Adams
- Profession: teacher, author

William Taylor Adams (July 30, 1822 – March 27, 1897), pseudonym Oliver Optic, was an academic, author, and a member of the Massachusetts House of Representatives.

== Early life and education ==
Adams was born in Medway, Massachusetts, on July 30, 1822, to tavern keeper Captain Laban Adams and Catherine Johnson Adams.

Adams was an honors student at schools in Boston and West Roxbury. After finishing public school, he attended Abel Whitney's private academy for a year.

== Teaching career ==
Adams became a teacher in the Lower Road School in Dorchester, Massachusetts, in 1843. He resigned from his position as master of the school in 1846 in order to assist his father and brother in the management of their new hotel in Boston, the Adams House hotel. Adams decided that he preferred teaching so in 1848 he returned to teaching, this time at the Boylston School in Boston. In 1860, Adams was promoted to the position of master of the Boylston School. When the Bowditch School was founded, Adams transferred to that school as its master, a position he held until he resigned from teaching in 1865. This experience naturally brought him closely into contact with boys, and he learned much of what interested them, which had a good deal to do with his eventual success as an author. Extensive travel abroad and a deep knowledge of boats, farming, and practical mechanics were other factors that gave his works reality.

== Family life ==
Adams visited Europe more than twenty times and traveled in Asia and Africa. In 1846, he married Sarah Jenkins, with whom he had two daughters, Alice Maria Adams and Emma Louisa Adams.

== School committee service ==
Adams served as a member of the Harris school board of the town of Dorchester, Massachusetts, and later of the Dwight, Boylston, and Bowditch schools in the city of Boston, for 14 years.

== Member of the Massachusetts House of Representatives ==
Adams served as a member of the Massachusetts House of Representatives, for the 5th Norfolk District, from January 6, 1869, to January 5, 1870.

== Career as an author ==
Adams first began to write at the age of 28, and his first book, Hatchie, the Guardian Slave (1853), was published under the pseudonym of Warren T. Ashton. It was only a modest success, but Adams was undaunted. In 1854 Adams produced his first real hit, the initial volume in the Boat Club series. Adams continued to write until he died in Dorchester, March 27, 1897. Among his best-known works were the two "Blue & Gray" series, which were set during the Civil War.

Adams wrote well over 100 books in total, most of them for boys, and the majority of these in series of four to six volumes published under a pseudonym. Two novels published in his own name, The Way of the World and Living Too Fast, were aimed at adult readers but fell flat. Though "Oliver Optic" was the pseudonym he used most, his work also appeared under the bylines "Irving Brown," "Clingham Hunter, M.D.," and "Old Stager." Like many children's authors of his day, he was additionally an editor, and many of his works first appeared in Oliver Optic's Magazine.

Adams' writing was criticized by Louisa May Alcott, among others. Alcott used her story Eight Cousins to deplore Adams' use of slang, his cast of bootblacks and newsboys, and his stories of police courts and saloons. Adams responded in kind, pointing out Alcott's own use of slang and improbable plot twists.

== List of works ==
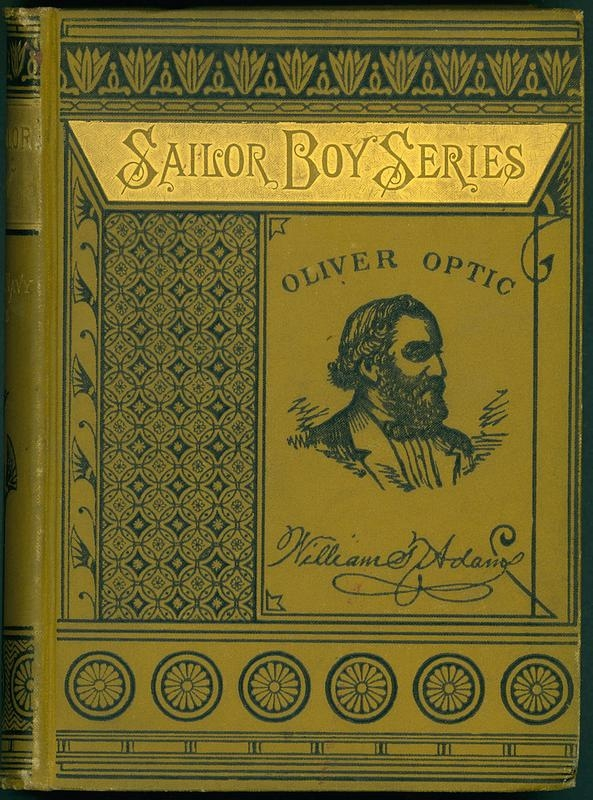
Oliver Optic's Sailor Boy, or, Jack Somers in the Navy (Boston: Lee and Shepard, 1863

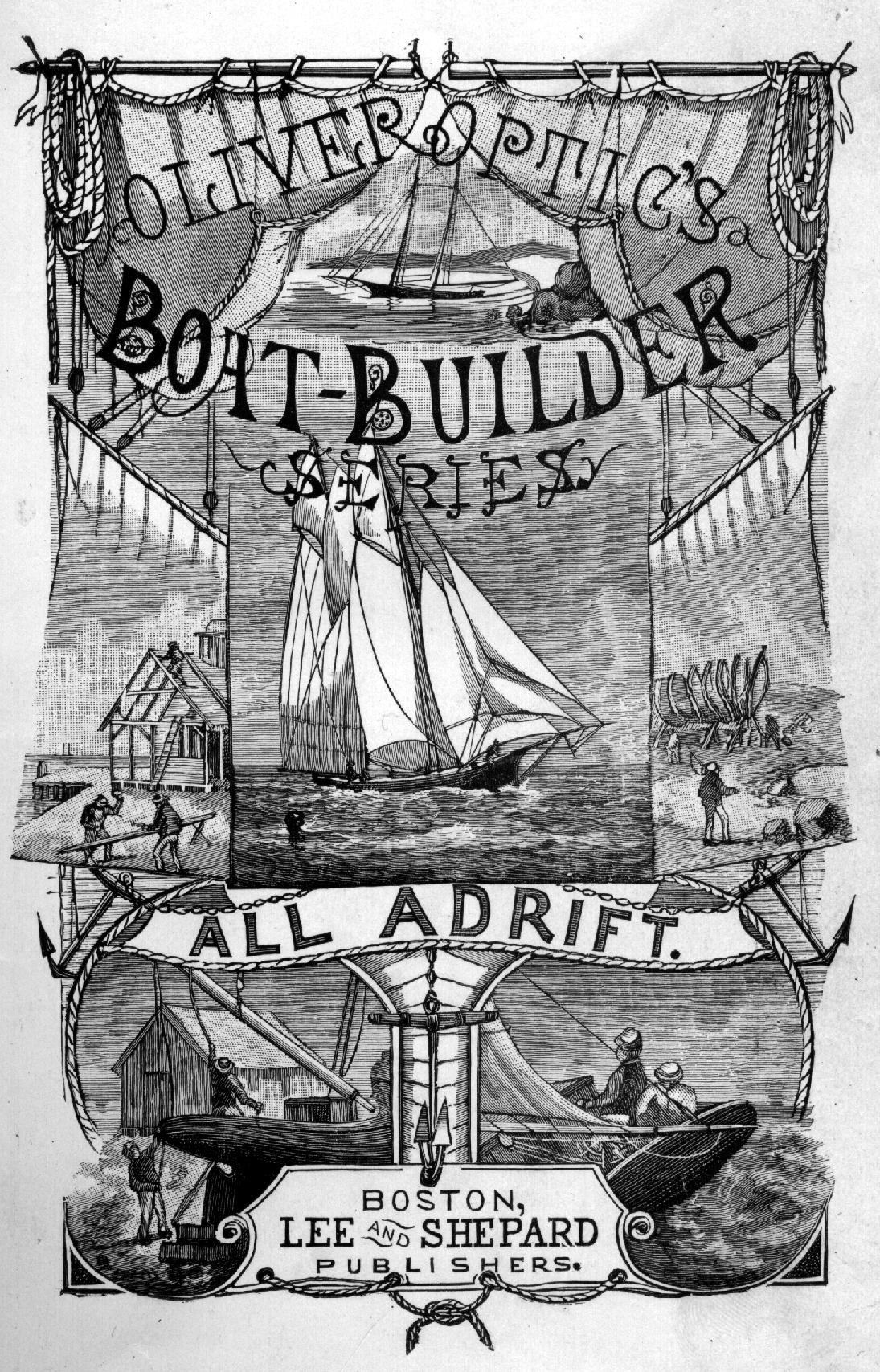
Oliver Optic's All Adrift (Boston: Lee & Shepard, 1892)

=== Books for both boys and girls ===
==== Riverdale Stories (subtitled : A Story for Little Folks, all 1862) ====
1. The Little Merchant
2. The Young Voyagers
3. The Christmas Gift
4. Dolly and I
5. Uncle Ben
6. The Birthday Party
7. Proud and Lazy
8. Careless Kate
9. Robinson Crusoe, Jr.
10. The Picnic Party
11. The Gold Thimble
12. The Do-Somethings

(Around 1864 this series was reprinted in a uniform edition of two series, the "Riverdale Story Books" and "Flora Lee Stories", each of six volumes)

==== Woodville ====
1. Rich and Humble; or, The Mission of Bertha Grant (1863)
2. In School and Out; or, The Conquest of Richard Grant (1863)
3. Watch and Wait; or, The Young Fugitives (1864)
4. Work and Win; or, Noddy Newman on a Cruise (1865)
5. Hope and Have; or, Fanny Grant Among the Indians (1866)
6. Haste and Waste; or, The Young Pilot of Lake Champlain (1866)

=== Series for boys ===
==== Boat Club ====
1. The Boat Club; or, The Bunkers of Rippleton (1854)
2. All Aboard; or, Life on the Lake (1856)
3. Now or Never; or, The Adventures of Bobby Bright (1856)
4. Try Again; or, The Trials and Triumphs of Harry West (aka The Boy Who Did Right) (1857)
5. Poor and Proud; or, The Fortunes of Katy Redburn (1858)
6. Little by Little; or, The Cruise of the Flyaway (1860)

==== Army and Navy ====
1. The Soldier Boy; or, Tom Somers in the Army (1863)
2. The Sailor Boy; or, Jack Somers in the Navy (1863)
3. The Young Lieutenant; or, The Adventures of an Army Officer (1865)
4. The Yankee Middy; or, The Adventures of a Naval Officer (1865)
5. Fighting Joe; or, The Fortunes of a Staff Officer (1865)
6. Brave Old Salt; or, Life on the Quarter Deck (1866)

(#1, 3, 5 were later republished as the Soldier Boy Series; #2, 4, 6, as the Sailor Boy series.)

==== Young America Abroad - first series ====
1. Outward Bound; or, Young America Afloat (1866)
2. Shamrock and Thistle; or, Young America in Ireland and Scotland (1867)
3. Red Cross; or, Young America in England and Wales (1867)
4. Dikes and Ditches; or Young America in Holland and Belgium (1868)
5. Palace and Cottage; or Young America in France and Switzerland (1868)
6. Down the Rhine; or, Young America in Germany (1869)

==== Young America Abroad - second series ====
1. Up the Baltic; or, Young America in Norway, Sweden and Denmark (1871)
2. Northern Lands; or, Young America in Russia and Prussia (1872)
3. Cross and Crescent; or, Young America in Turkey and Greece (1872)
4. Sunny Shores; or, Young America in Italy and Austria (1874)
5. Vine and Olive; or, Young America in Spain and Portugal (1876)
6. Isles of the Sea; or, Young America Homeward Bound (1877)

==== Starry Flag ====
1. The Starry Flag; or, The Young Fisherman of Cape Ann (1867)
2. Breaking Away; or, The Fortunes of a Student (also known as The Way to Succeed, 1867)
3. Seek and Find; or, The Adventures of a Smart Boy (1867)
4. Freaks of Fortune; or, Half Round the World (1868)
5. Make or Break; or, The Rich Man's Daughter (1868)
6. Down the River; or, Buck Bradford and His Tyrants (1868)

==== Upward and Onward ====
1. Field and Forest; or, The Fortunes of a Farmer (1870)
2. Plane and Plank; or, The Mishaps of a Mechanic (1870)
3. Desk and Debit; or, The Catastrophes of a Clerk (1871)
4. Cringle and Cross-tree; or, The Sea Swashes of a Sailor (1871)
5. Bivouac and Battle; or, The Struggles of a Soldier (1871)
6. Sea and Shore; or, The Tramps of a Traveller (1872)

==== Yacht Club ====
1. Little Bobtail; or, The Wreck of the Penobscot (1872)
2. The Yacht Club; or, The Young Boat-Builder (1873)
3. Money-Maker; or, The Victory of the Basilisk (1873)
4. The Coming Wave; or, The Hidden Treasure of High Rock (1874)
5. The Dorcas Club; or, Our Girls Afloat (1874)
6. Ocean-Born; or, The Cruise of the Clubs (1875)

==== Lake Shore ====
1. Through by Daylight; or, The Young Engineer of the Lake Shore Express (1869, vice versa 1887?)
2. Lightning Express; or, The Rival Academies (1869, repr 1998 as Duty Bound; or, The Lightning Express (1998))
3. On Time; or, The Young Captain of the Ucayga Steamer (also published as Bound to Get There, 1869; reprinted 1998 as Forgive and Forget; or, The Young Captain of the Ucayga Steamer)
4. Switch Off; or, The War of the Students (aka ..., When Danger Threatens, 1869; repr 1998 as Heaping Coals of Fire; or, The War of the Students)
5. Brake Up; or, The Young Peacemakers (aka ..., A Roving Commission, 1870)
6. Bear and Forbear; or, The Young Skipper of Lake Ucayga (1870)

==== Great Western ====
1. Going West; or, The Perils of a Poor Boy (1875)
2. Out West; or, Roughing It on the Great Lakes (1877)
3. Lake Breezes; or, The Cruise of the Sylvania (1878)
4. Going South; or, Yachting on the Atlantic Coast (1879)
5. Down South; or, Yacht Adventures in Florida (1880)
6. Up the River; or, Yachting on the Mississippi (1881)

==== Boat-Builder ====
1. All Adrift; or, The Goldwing Club (1882)
2. Snug Harbor; or, The Champlain Mechanics (1883)
3. Square and Compasses; or, Building the House (1884)
4. Stem to Stern; or, Building the Boat (1885)
5. All Taut; or, Rigging the Boat (1886)
6. Ready About; or, Sailing the Boat (1887)

==== Blue and the Gray Afloat ====
1. Taken by the Enemy (1883)
2. Within the Enemy's Lines (1889)
3. On the Blockade (1891)
4. Stand by the Union (1891)
5. Fighting for the Right (1892)
6. A Victorious Union (1893)

==== Blue and the Gray on Land ====
1. Brother against Brother; or, The War on the Border (1894)
2. In the Saddle (1895)
3. A Lieutenant at Eighteen (1895)
4. On the Staff (1896)
5. At the Front (1897)
6. An Undivided Union (1899, completed by Edward Stratemeyer after Adams's death)

==== All Over the World - first series ====
1. A Missing Million; or, The Adventures of Louis Belgrave (1891)
2. A Millionaire at Sixteen; or, The Cruise of the "Guardian-Mother" (1892)
3. A Young Knight-Errant;or, Cruising in the West Indies (1893)
4. Strange Sights Abroad; or, A Voyage in European Waters (1893)

==== All Over the World - second series ====
1. American Boys Afloat; or, Cruising in the Orient (1893)
2. The Young Navigators; or, The Foreign Cruise of the Maud (1893)
3. Up and Down the Nile; or, Young Adventurers in Africa (1894)
4. Asiatic Breezes; or, Students on the Wing (1894)

==== All Over the World - third series ====
1. Across India; or, Live Boys in the Far East (1895)
2. Half Round the World; or, Among the Uncivilized (1895)
3. Four Young Explorers; or, Sight-Seeing in the Tropics (1896)
4. Pacific Shores; or, Adventures in Eastern Seas (1897)

==== Non-series titles ====
Oliver Optic's Just his luck (Lothrop, Lee, and Shepard Co.)

- A Spelling-Book For Advanced Classes (1873)
- Always in Luck, or Working for a Living (1887)
- Among the Missing, or The Boy They Could Not Beat (1890)
- Breaking Away, or Pluck Brings Luck (1887)
- Building Himself Up, or A Fight for the Right (1881)
- The Casket of Diamonds, or Hope Everton's Inheritance (1902)
- The Coming Wave, or The Hidden Treasure of High Rock (1874)
- The Cruise of the Dandy, or Doing His Best (1880)
- Every Inch a Boy; or, Fighting for a Hold (1884)
- Freaks of Fortune, or Saved from Himself (1863)
- Getting an Indorser, and Other Stories (1875)
- The Great Bonanza: An Illustrated Narrative of Adventure and Discovery in Gold Mining, Silver Mining, Among the Raftsmen, In the Oil Regions, Whaling, Hunting, Fishing, and Fighting (1876)
- His Own Helper; or, By Sheer Pluck (1913)
- Honest Kit Dunstable, or The Boy Who Earned Money (1887)
- In Doors and Out; or, Views from the Chimney Corner (1854, 1876)
- Just his luck (1905)
- Louis Chiswick's Mission; or, Going With the Current (aka ..., Up the Ladder of Success) (1883)
- Lyon Hart's Heroism; or, Courage Wins (1883)
- Making a Man of Himself, or, Right Makes Might (1884)
- Marrying a Beggar, or The Angel in Disguise, and Other Tales (1859)
- Our Standard-Bearer; or The Life of General Ulysses S. Grant: His Youth, His Manhood, His Campaigns, and His Eminent Services in the Reconstruction of the Nation His Sword Has Redeemed (1868)
- The Prisoners of the Cave, or By Sheer Will Power (1888)
- The Professor's Son, or Against All Odds (1884)
- Royal Tarr's Pluck, or The Boy Who Fought Fair (1883)
- Sports and Pastimes for Indoors and Out (1914)
- Striving for His Own (1885)
- Three Young Silver Kings, or At Fortune's Call (aka ...In Search of Treasure, 1887)
- Tried and True, or The Young Peacemakers (1898)

=== Books for adults ===
- Hatchie, the guardian slave; or, The heiress of Bellevue. A tale of the Mississippi and the South-west (as by Warren T. Ashton, 1853)
- Living Too Fast, or The Confessions of a Bank Officer (1876)
- The Voyage of Life: An Allegory (1887)
- The Way of the World: A Novel (1867)
