= Barbara Vann =

American theatre director and actor

- Born: Barbara Kutner; December 12, 1938; Brooklyn, NY
- Died: August 26, 2015 (aged 76)
- Occupations: Theatre director, actor
- Known for: The Open Theater, Medicine Show Theatre Ensemble

Barbara Vann (December 12, 1938 - August 26, 2015) was an American theatre director and actor, best known for co-founding the Off-Off-Broadway company the Medicine Show Theater Ensemble, one of the longest continually running experimental theater companies in New York City. She was also a founding member of The Open Theater, an early, New York City-based experimental theater group.

== Biography ==
Vann was born Barbara Kutner in 1938 in Brooklyn, and graduated from Mount Holyoke College in 1959.

== The Open Theater ==
In 1962, Vann and about 20 other former students of acting teacher Nola Chilton, along with director Joseph Chaikin, founded The Open Theater, under Chaikin's direction.

== The Medicine Show Theatre ==
After The Open Theater dissolved in 1970, she founded The Medicine Show Theatre Ensemble with fellow Open Theater member, James Barbosa, who died in 2003. Vann led the Medicine Show Theatre Ensemble for 45 years until her death in August 2015.

At the Medicine Show Theatre, Vann directed Bound to Rise, based on Bound to Rise; or, Harry Walton's Motto (1873), the Horatio Alger story, which led to a 1985 Obie Award in direction. She also contributed reworkings of Alfred Jarry's Ubu plays; a stage adaption of James Joyce's Finnegans Wake; a translation of Jean Genet's The Balcony; and the original vaudeville piece, "Mr. Shakespeare and Mr. Porter", which incorporated Cole Porter songs into Shakespearean tragedies. She published a series of workshop videos demonstrating the experimental techniques developed for the Medicine Show Theatre Ensemble. Vann directed a 1991 production of E. E. Cummings' play Him starring John McIlveen, Cori Thomas, and Norton Banks.

== Film ==
Vann, with Rao Rampilla, directed the live action short, Gandhi, Untouchables and Me, in 2015 and provided voice talent in the 2014 animated short, Privy.

== Teaching ==
Vann taught at Smith College, Amherst College, Yale University and Colgate University. She also taught and led master classes at more than 80 universities in North America and on five European tours.

== Personal life ==
Barbara Vann died on August 26, 2015. She was survived by her daughter, Regan and two grandchildren.

== Awards ==
Barbara Vann was the recipient of the 1985 Obie Award for Direction, which she received for her work on the production, Bound to Rise, based on the Horatio Alger story, Bound to Rise; or, Harry Walton's Motto (1873).
