= Sink or Swim =

Sink or Swim may refer to:

== Film and television ==
=== Film ===
- Sink or Swim (1920 film) an American film of 1920
- Sink or Swim (1963 film) a Japanese film featuring Kumi Mizuno
- Sink or Swim (1990 film), an American experimental film by Su Friedrich
- Sink or Swim (2018 film), a French comedy drama film

=== Television ===
==== Series ====
- Sink or Swim (TV series), a 1980–1982 British sitcom

==== Episodes ====
- "Sink or Swim" (9-1-1), 2019
- "Sink or Swim" (Below Deck Mediterranean), 2023
- "Sink or Swim" (Black-ish), 2016
- "Sink or Swim" (CSI: Miami), 2009
- "Sink or Swim" (Hell's Kitchen), 2021
- "Sink or Swim" (Holby City), 2013
- "Sink or Swim" (Kim Possible), 2002
- "Sink or Swim" (Odd Man Out), 1977
- "Sink or Swim" (Real Housewives of Miami), 2024
- "Sink or Swim" (The Suite Life of Zack & Cody), 2007

== Music ==
=== Albums ===
- Sink or Swim (The Gaslight Anthem album), 2007
- Sink or Swim (The Waifs album) or the title song, 2000
- Sink or Swim, by Over My Dead Body, 2003

=== Songs ===
- "Sink or Swim" (song), by Bad Lieutenant, 2009
- "Sink or Swim", by Chicosci from Revenge of the Giant Robot, 2000
- "Sink or Swim", by Craig David from Following My Intuition, 2016
- "Sink or Swim", by Ella Mai from Heart on My Sleeve, 2022
- "Sink or Swim", by Falling in Reverse from The Drug in Me Is You, 2011
- "Sink or Swim", by OneRepublic from Artificial Paradise, 2024

== Other media ==
- Sink or Swim (video game), a 1993 puzzle game
- Sink or Swim; or, Harry Raymond's Resolve, an 1870 novel by Horatio Alger Jr.

== See also ==
- "Sink or Swim Team", a 2022 episode of Craig of the Creek
