= John Eliot Historic District =

Historic district in Massachusetts, United States

- U.S. National Register of Historic Places
- U.S. Historic district
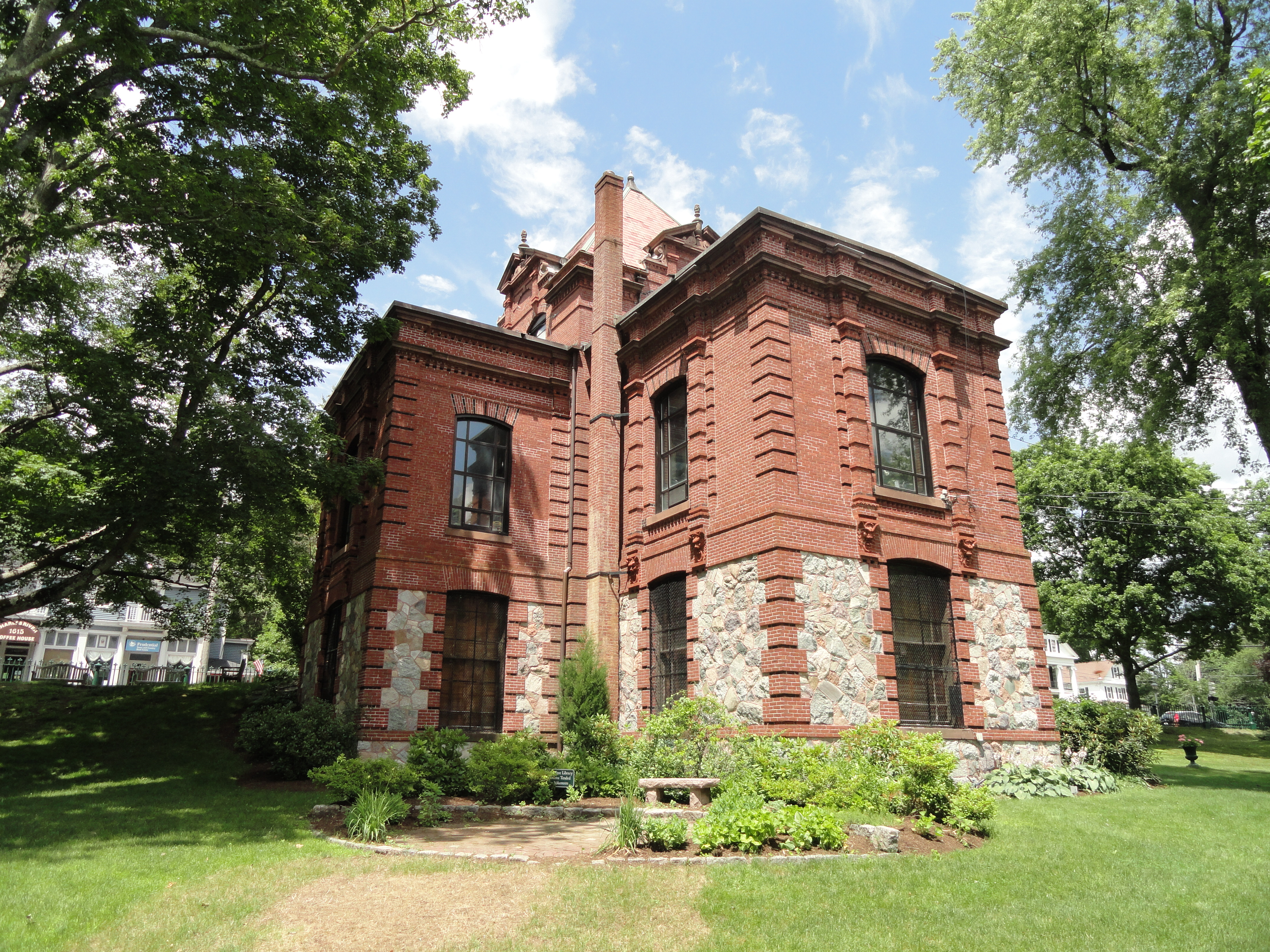
- Bacon Free Library

- Location within Massachusetts Location within the United States
- Location: Union, Pleasant, and Eliot Sts., Natick, Massachusetts
- Coordinates: 42°16′20″N 71°18′56″W
- Area: 71.22 acres (28.82 ha)
- Built: 1651
- Architectural style: Greek Revival, Federal
- NRHP reference No.: 83000812
- Added to NRHP: June 23, 1983

The John Eliot Historic District encompasses what was the historic early village center of Natick, Massachusetts. Now the heart of the village of South Natick, it now exhibits a diversity of architecture from the 18th to early 20th centuries, laid out along historic 17th-century colonial routes. It was listed on the National Register of Historic Places in 1983.

== Description and history ==
The South Natick village center is located in southeastern Natick, formed by the junction of Eliot Street (Massachusetts Route 16) with Union and Pleasant Streets. It is located just north of a bend in the Charles River, and has a documented history of both colonial and prehistoric settlement. The roadways probably predate 1651, likely serving as Native American trails. In that year, missionary John Eliot established a settlement of Praying Indians, the first of its kind, on this site. The present bridge across the Charles is located where an early footbridge was built, and the South Natick Dam is at the site of what was once a natural falls and fishing weir. The Native settlement, originally with about 180 individuals, had shrunk by 1797 to just 20. The town, incorporated in 1781, was then dominated by white settlers, its center relocated to a more geographically central site. The first dam in the village was built in 1752, and the area now occupied by a town park on the banks of the river was an industrial site, with a fulling mill and sawmill.

The historic district is essentially X-shaped, radiating away from the central junction on the four roadways. Its center is dominated by the Federal-style John Eliot Church (1828), and the Gothic former John Eliot Congregational Church (1862), and the Renaissance Bacon Library, built in 1880 to a design by Robert G. Shaw. The library is built partly over the grounds of the colonial-era Indian burying ground, one of the places of particular archaeological significance in the district. The village also includes the homes of two important 19th-century writers: one of Harriet Beecher Stowe, and another (a National Historic Landmark) of Horatio Alger.

== See also ==
- National Register of Historic Places listings in Middlesex County, Massachusetts
