= List of works by Horatio Alger Jr. =

Horatio Alger Jr. published about 100 poems and odes, most written by 1875. In 1853–54, he published short stories with Gleason's Pictorial Drawing-Room Companion and The Flag of Our Nation. Other Gleason publications printed about 100 stories before he began writing for The Student and Schoolmate.

Alger had many publishers over the decades. His first was A. K. Loring of Boston, and when Loring declared bankruptcy in 1881, Porter & Coates became his second and Henry T. Coates and Company his third. Other publishers include G. W. Carleton, J. S. Oglivie, John Anderson who published the biographies, A. L. Burt, Frank Munsey, Penn Publishing, and Street & Smith. M. A. Donahue and the New York Book Company published inexpensive paperback reprints by the thousands. It is believed there were at least 60 publishers releasing Alger.

Title	Date	Genre	Publication	Synopsis/Notes
"Voices of the Past"	1849	Poem.	Published in the Boston monthly magazine Pictorial National Library.	
Fair Harvard	1852	Poem.		
"A Welcome to May"	1853	Poem.		
Bertha's Christmas Vision: An Autumn Sheaf	1856	Poems and short stories.	Published by Brown, Bazin and Company of Boston.	Alger's first book.
Nothing to Do: A Tilt at Our Best Society	1857	Poem.	Published anonymously by James French & Company.	Satire about the idle upper classes.
Nothing To Eat	1857			
He Has Gone, and I Have Sent Him!	1862	Poem.	Published in Harper's Weekly Nov. 1862	Civil War poem.
Marie Bertrand	1864	Adult Novel.	Serialized by Street & Smith in the New York Weekly.	A kidnapped young woman is reunited with her mother, a French countess.
Frank's Campaign; or, What Boys Can Do on the Farm for the Camp	1864	Juvenile Novel.	Published by A. K. Loring.	First volume of the Campaign Series. Frank Frost manages the family farm when his father goes to war. Alger's first boys' book. Online at Gutenberg
Paul Prescott's Charge: A Story for Boys	1865	Juvenile Novel.	Published by Loring.	Second volume of the Campaign Series. A youth pays off his deceased father's debts. Online at Gutenberg
Charlie Codman's Cruise: A Story for Boys	1866	Juvenile novel.	Published by Loring.	Third and final volume of the Campaign Series. A youth is shanghaied but restored to his home after adventures at sea. Online at Gutenberg
Helen Ford	1866	Adult novel.	Published by Loring.	The tribulations of a young woman in NYC before she falls in love with a promising artist.
Timothy Crump's Ward; or, The New Years Loan, And What Became of It	1866	Adult novel.	Published anonymously by Loring.	Later reworked as Sam's Ward for the juvenile market.
John Maynard: A Ballad of Lake Erie	1868	Poem.	Published in Student and Schoolmate in January 1868 and then in various publications.	A helmsman perishes at the wheel while the ship burns. Based on an actual incident.
Ragged Dick; or, Street Life in New York with the Bootblacks	1868	Juvenile novel.	First serialized in twelve installments in Student and Schoolmate in 1867. Published by Loring in book format in 1868.	First volume of the Ragged Dick Series. A New York City bootblack rises to middle class respectability through hard work, honesty, and determination. Alger's all-time bestseller. Online at Gutenberg
Fame and Fortune; or, The Progress of Richard Hunter	1868	Juvenile novel.	First serialized in twelve installments in Student and Schoolmate. Novelization published by Loring.	Second volume of the Ragged Dick Series. Continues the story of Ragged Dick and his experiences after leaving bootblacking for an office job. Online at Gutenberg.
Luck and Pluck; or, John Oakley's Inheritance	1869	Juvenile novel.	Published by Loring.	First volume in the Luck and Pluck Series.
Mark the Match Boy; or, Richard Hunter's Ward	1869	Juvenile novel.	Published by Loring.	Third volume in the Ragged Dick Series.
Rough and Ready; or, Life Among the New York Newsboys	1869	Juvenile novel.	Published by Loring.	Fourth volume in the Ragged Dick Series.
Ralph Raymond's Heir; or, The Merchant's Crime	1869	Short story.	Published under the pseudonym "Arthur Hamilton" for Gleason's Literary Companion.	
Ben The Luggage Boy; or, Among the Wharves	1870	Juvenile novel.	Published by Loring.	Fifth volume in the Ragged Dick Series. Boy runs away from home and struggles as a luggage carrier in New York. Online at Gutenberg.
Rufus and Rose; or, The Fortunes of Rough and Ready	1870	Juvenile novel.	Published by Loring.	Sixth and final volume in the Ragged Dick Series. Sequel to Rough and Ready. Rufus and Rose try to avoid their evil stepfather. Online at Gutenberg
Sink or Swim; or, Harry Raymond's Resolve	1870	Juvenile novel.	Published by Loring.	Second volume in the Luck and Pluck Series.
Paul the Peddler; or the Fortunes of a Young Street Merchant	1871	Juvenile novel.	Serialized in Student and Schoolmate. Novelization published by Loring.	Second volume in the Tattered Tom Series. Young entrepreneur goes from selling candy to owning a necktie stand. Online at Gutenberg
Strong and Steady; or, Paddle Your Own Canoe	1871	Juvenile novel.	Published by Loring.	Third volume in the Luck and Pluck Series. Online at Gutenberg
Tattered Tom; or, The Story of a Street Arab	1871	Juvenile novel.	Published by Loring.	First volume in the Tattered Tom Series. Jane Lindsay is a child streetsweeper. Online at Gutenberg
"Friar Anselmo"	1872	Poem.		A sinning cleric finds redemption in ministering to the sick.
Phil the Fiddler; or, The Story of a Young Street Musician	1872	Juvenile novel.	Published by Loring.	Third volume in the Tattered Tom Series. Phil is an Italian boy enslaved by a padrone.
Slow and Sure; The Story of Paul Hoffman the Young Street-Merchant	1872	Juvenile novel.	Published by Loring.	Fourth volume in the Tattered Tom Series. Sequel to Paul the Peddler. Paul moves from his street stall to a retail store. Online at Gutenberg
Strive and Succeed; or, The Progress of Walter Conrad	1872	Juvenile novel.	Published by Loring.	Fourth volume in the Luck and Pluck Series. Online at University of Florida
Bound to Rise; or, Harry Walton's Motto	1873	Juvenile novel.	Published by Loring.	Sixth volume in the Luck and Pluck Series.
Try and Trust; or, The Story of a Bound Boy	1873	Juvenile novel.	Published by Loring.	Fifth volume in the Luck and Pluck Series.
Brave and Bold; or, The Fortunes of Robert Rushton	1874	Juvenile novel.	Published by Loring.	First in the Brave and Bold Series. A youth searches for his sea captain father.
Julius; or, The Street Boy Out West	1874	Juvenile novel.	Published by Loring.	Fifth volume in the Tattered Tom Series. A boy is resettled in the west through the agency of the Children's Aid Society.
Risen from the Ranks; or, Harry Walton's Success	1874	Juvenile novel.	Published by Loring.	Seventh volume in the Luck and Pluck Series.
Grand'ther Baldwin's Thanksgiving	1875	Poems.		
Herbert Carter's Legacy; or, The Inventor's Son	1875	Juvenile novel.	Published by Loring.	Eighth and last volume in the Luck and Pluck Series. A boy and his mother thwart a Squire foreclosing on their cottage.
Jack's Ward; or, The Boy Guardian	1875	Juvenile novel.	Published by Loring.	Second volume in the Brave and Bold Series. Reworking of Timothy Crump's Ward.
Seeking His Fortune, And Other Dialogues	1875			
"On His Own"	1893			
St. Nicholas	1875			
The Young Outlaw; or, Adrift In The Streets	1875	Juvenile novel.	Published by Loring.	Sixth volume in the Tattered Tom Series. Sam Barlow resists reform.
Sam's Chance; and How He Improved It	1876	Juvenile novel.	Published by Loring.	Seventh volume in the Tattered Tom Series. Sequel to The Young Outlaw. Sam improves and finds an office job.
Shifting for Himself; or, Gilbert Greyson's Fortunes	1876	Juvenile novel.	Published by Loring.	Third volume in the Brave and Bold Series. A rich youth loses his fortune.
The New Schoolma'am; or, A Summer in North Sparta	1877	Adult novella.	Published anonymously.	A privileged young woman changes her name to teach school in New Hampshire.
Wait and Hope; or, Ben Bradford's Motto	1877	Juvenile novel.	Published by Loring.	Fourth and last volume in the Brave and Bold Series. A mill boy is laid off but remains optimistic about his future.
The Western Boy; or, The Road to Success	1878			
The Young Adventurer; or, Tom's Trip Across the Plains	1878	Juvenile novel.	Published by Loring.	First volume of the Pacific series. Western setting. A boy head west to find gold and help pay the mortgage.
The Telegraph Boy	1879	Juvenile novel.	Published by Loring.	Eighth and last volume in the Tattered Tom Series. A penniless boy finds a job as a telegram messenger boy. Last of the fourteen social reform novels begun with Ragged Dick. Online at University of Florida
The Young Miner; or, Tom Nelson in California	1879	Juvenile novel.	Published by Loring.	Western theme. Second volume of the Pacific series.
Tony the Hero	1880			
The Young Explorer; or, Among the Sierras	1880	Juvenile novel.	Published by Loring.	Western theme. Third volume in the Pacific series
From Canal Boy to President; or, The Boyhood and Manhood of James A. Garfield	1881	Biography	Published by John R. Anderson	
Ben's Nugget; or, A Boy's Search for Fortune	1882	Juvenile novel.	Published by Porter & Coates after Loring declares bankruptcy.	Western theme. Fourth and final volume in the Pacific series.
From Farm Boy to Senator: Being the History of the Boyhood and Manhood of Daniel Webster	1882	Biography	Published by J. S. Ogilvie and Company.	Originally published in serialization by Street & Smith, 1860s.
Abraham Lincoln: the Backwoods Boy; or, How A Young Rail-Splitter Became President	1883	Biography	Published by John R. Anderson.	
The Train Boy	1883			
The Young Circus Rider; or, The Mystery of Robert Rudd	1883			
Dan, the Detective	1884			
Do and Dare; or A Brave Boy's Fight for Fortune	1884			
Hector's Inheritance; or, The Boys of Smith Institute	1885			
Helping Himself; or, Grant Thornton's Ambition	1886			Online at UFL
Frank Fowler, the Cash Boy	1887			
Number 91; or, The Adventures of a New York Telegraph Boy	1887			
The Store Boy; or, The Fortunes of Ben Barclay	1887			
Joe's Luck; or, A Boy's Adventures in California	1887		Published by A. L. Burt	
Bob Burton; or, The Young Ranchman of the Missouri	1888		Published by Porter & Coates	
The Errand Boy; or, How Phil Brent Won Success	1888			
Tom Temple's Career	1888			
Tom Thatcher's Fortune	1888			
Tom Tracy	1888			
The Young Acrobat of the Great North American Circus	1888	Juvenile novel.		Circus theme suggested by P. T. Barnum. First serialized in The Golden Argosy.
Luke Walton; or, The Chicago Newsboy	1889			
Struggling Upward; or, Luke Larkin's Luck	1890	Juvenile novel.	Published by Porter & Coates.	Small town boy helps solve bank robbery. Online at Gutenberg
The Erie Train Boy	1890			
Five Hundred Dollars; or, Jacob Marlowe's Secret	1890			
Mark Stanton	1890			
Ned Newton; or, The Fortunes of a New York Bootblack	1890	Juvenile novel.		First serialized in The Golden Argosy.
A New York Boy	1890			
The Odds Against Him; or, Carl Crawford's Experience	1890			
Dean Dunham; or, The Waterford Mystery	1891			
Digging for Gold. A Story of California	1892			
Grit; or, The Young Boatman of Pine Point	1892		Published by A. L. Burt Company	
Cast Upon the Breakers	1893			
In a New World; or, Among the Gold-Fields of Australia	1893			Sequel to "Facing the World"
Facing the World; or, The Haps and Mishaps of Harry Vane	1893	Juvenile novel		Serialized in The Golden Argosy
Only an Irish Boy; Or, Andy Burke's Fortunes and Misfortunes	1894			
Victor Vane, The Young Secretary	1894			
The Disagreeable Woman; A Social Mystery	1895	Adult novel	G. W. Carleton	Alger's last adult novel. Only one copy is known and held in the Library of Congress.
Adrift in the City; or, Oliver Conrad's Plucky Fight	1895	Juvenile novel		First serialized in New York Weekly as "Oliver the Outcast" in 1887.
Frank Hunter's Peril	1896			
The Young Salesman	1896			
Frank and Fearless; or, The Fortunes of Jasper Kent	1897			
Walter Sherwood's Probation	1897			
A Boy's Fortune; or, The Strange Adventures of Ben Baker	1898			
The Young Bank Messenger	1898			Online at Gutenberg.
Jed the Poorhouse Boy	1899	Juvenile novel.		A poorhouse boy is discovered to be an English baronet.
Mark Mason's Victory; or, The Trials and Triumphs of a Telegraph Boy	1899			
Rupert's Ambition	1899			
Silas Snobden's Office Boy	1899		J.S. Ogilvie & Company	Originally serialized by Argosy under the pseudonym Arthur Lee Putnam.
A Debt of Honor. The Story of Gerald Lane's Success in the Far West	1900			
Falling in With Fortune; or, The Experiences of a Young Secretary	1900			
Out for Business; or, Robert Frost's Strange Career	1900			
Ben Bruce. Scenes in the Life of a Bowery Newsboy	1901			
Lester's Luck	1901			
Nelson the Newsboy; or, Afloat in New York	1901			
Tom Brace: Who He Was and How He Fared	1901			
Young Captain Jack; or, The Son of a Soldier	1901	Juvenile novel		Originally serialized in Golden Hours. Promoted as Alger's last work. Completed by Edward Stratemeyer as Arthur M. Winfield.
Andy Grant's Pluck	1902			
A Rolling Stone; or, The Adventures of a Wanderer	1902			
Striving for Fortune; or, Walter Griffith's Trials and Successes	1902			
Tom Turner's Legacy	1902			
The World Before Him	1902			
Bernard Brooks' Adventures. The Story of a Brave Boy's Trials	1903			
Chester Rand; or, A New Path to Fortune	1903		Published by M.A. Donohue & Company Chicago, IL	
Forging Ahead	1903		Published by Philadelphia: Penn Publishing Company	Originally serialized in 1881 and again in 1898 in Golden Days for Boys and Girls as Andy Gordon, The Fortunes of a Young Janitor
Adrift in New York; or, Tom and Florence Braving the World	1904			
Finding a Fortune	1904			
Jerry the Backwoods Boy; or, The Parkhurst Treasure	1904			
Lost at Sea; or, Robert Roscoe's Strange Cruise	1904			
From Farm to Fortune; or Nat Nason's Strange Experience	1905			
Making His Mark	1905			
Mark Manning's Mission. The Story of a Shoe Factory Boy	1905			
The Young Book Agent; or, Frank Hardy's Road to Success	1905			
Joe the Hotel Boy, or Winning Out by Pluck	1906			
Randy of the River; or, The Adventures of a Young Deckhand	1906			
The Young Musician; or, Fighting His Way	1906			
In Search of Treasure. The Story of Guy's Eventful Voyage	1907		Published by A. L. Burt Company	
Ben Logan's Triumph; or, The Boys of Boxwood Academy	1908			
Wait and Win. The Story of Jack Drummond's Pluck	1908			
Tony The Tramp. Right is Might	1909		NEW YORK, THE NEW YORK BOOK COMPANY	
Robert Coverdale's Struggle; or, On the Wave of Success	1910			
