= Shoeshiner =

Person who cleans and polishes foot coverings

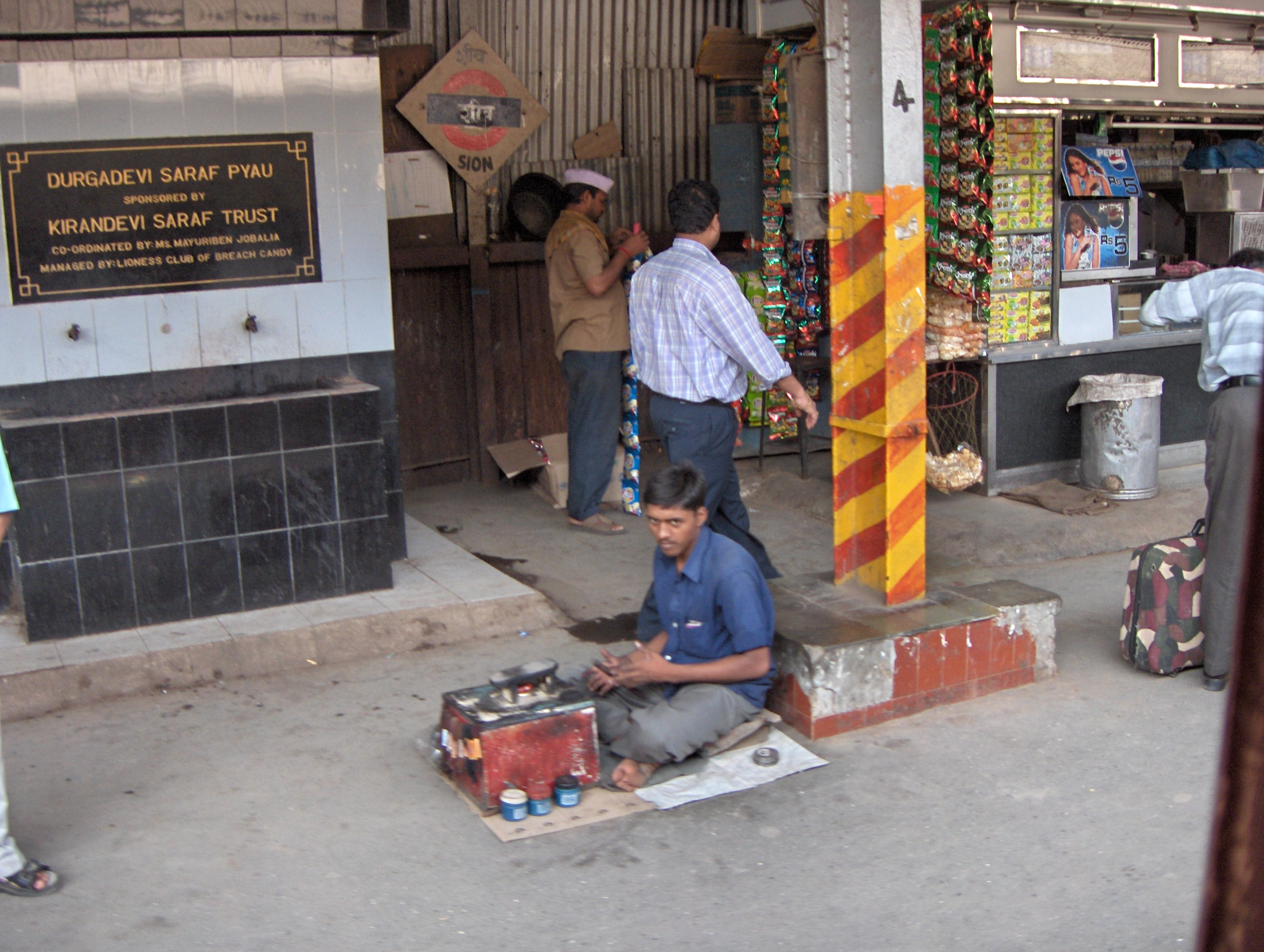
A boot polisher on a railway platform in Mumbai, India.

Shoeshiner or boot polisher is an occupation in which a person cleans and buffs shoes and then applies a waxy paste to give a shiny appearance and a protective coating. They are often known as shoeshine boys because the job was traditionally done by a male child. Other synonyms are bootblack and shoeblack. While the role is denigrated in much of Western civilization, shining shoes is an important source of income for many children and families throughout the world. Some shoeshiners offer extra services, such as shoe repairs and general tailoring.

== History ==
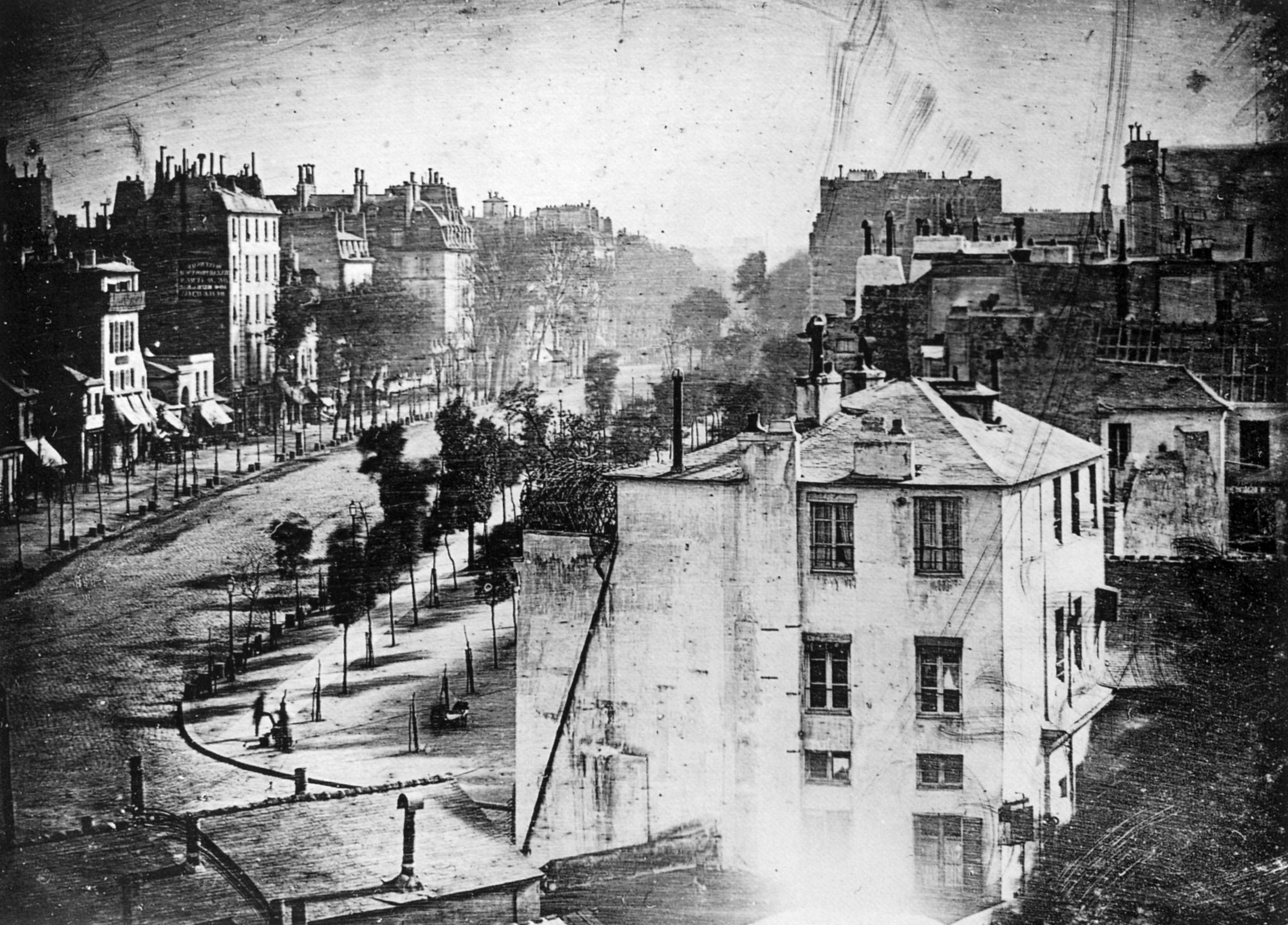
The earliest reliably dated photograph of a person, taken in spring 1838 by Daguerre, shows a person getting a shoeshine.

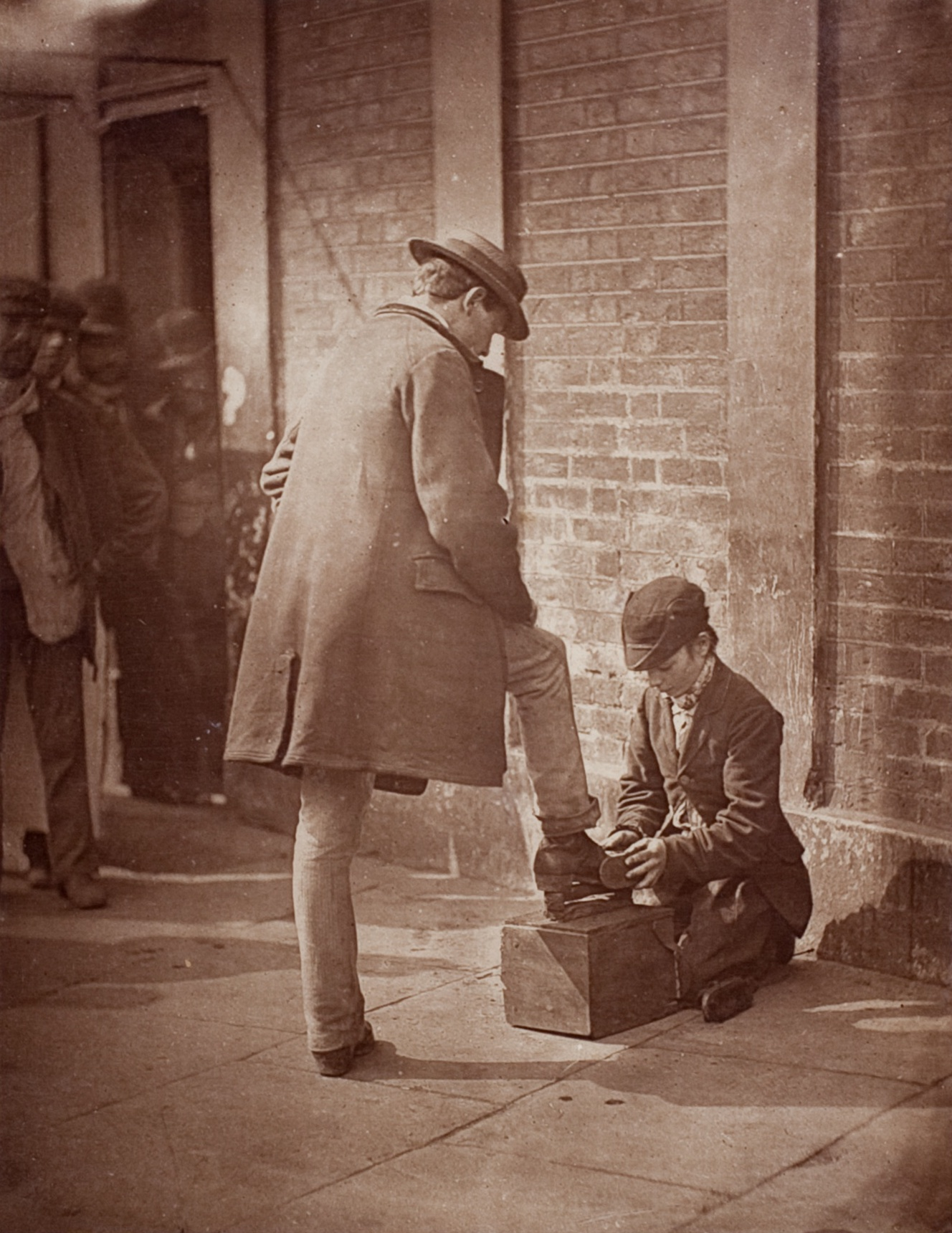
The Independent Shoe-Black by John Thomson, 1877.

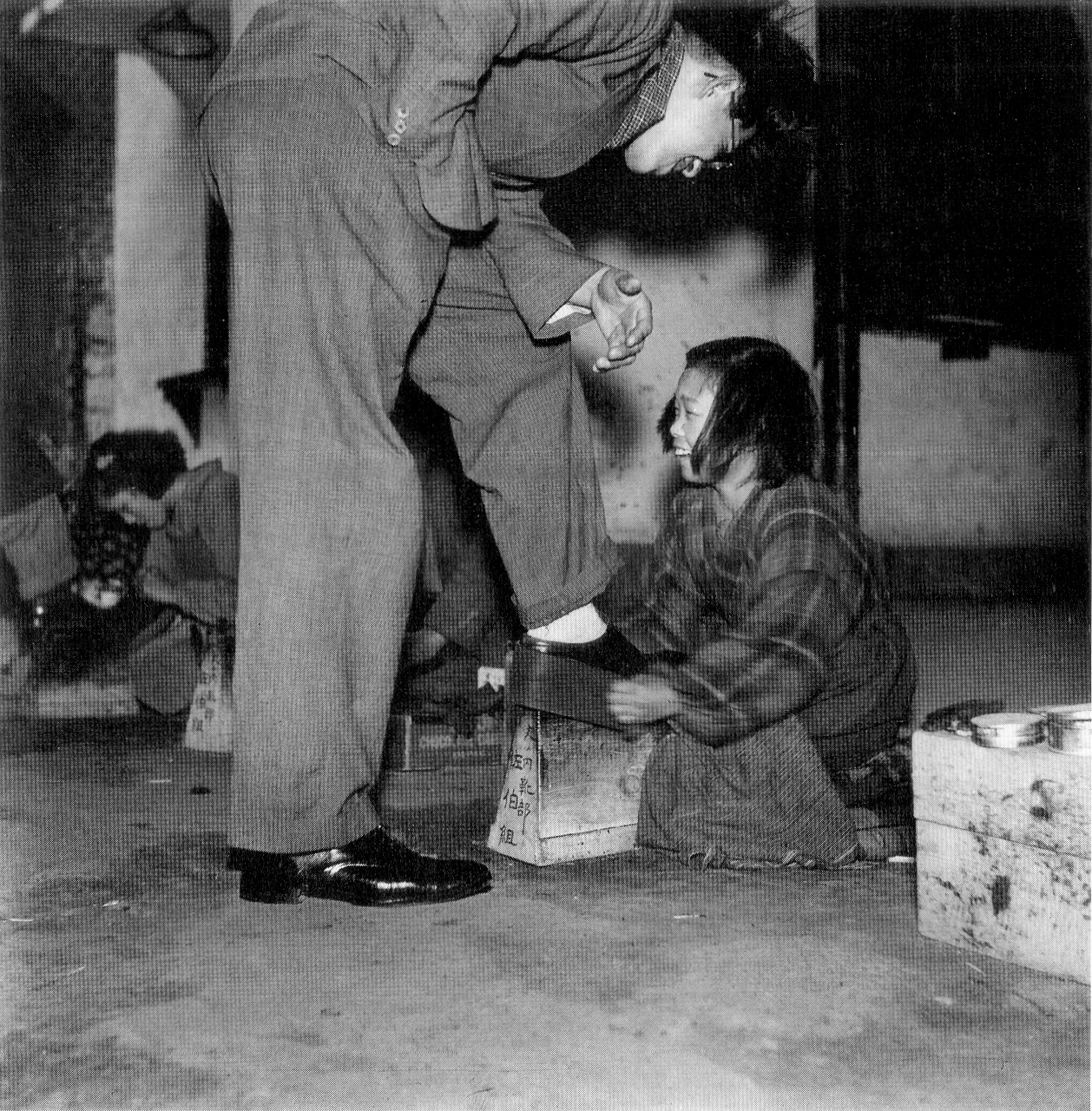
A young war-orphan shoeshiner in Japan, 1947

Very large households in Victorian England sometimes included a young male servant called the Boot Boy, specializing in the care of footwear. Hotel staff for this function were commonly called The Boots. (A Boots was one of the crew in The Hunting of the Snark.) Branded shoe polish appeared early in the 19th century: Charles Dickens was employed at age 12 in Warren's Blacking Factory in London in 1824. Since the late 19th century shoeshine boys plied their trade on the streets, and were common in British cities. The earliest known daguerreotype (photograph) of a human, View of the Boulevard du Temple, features a man having his shoes shined in the lower corner of the print. Though the image shows Paris' busy Boulevard du Temple, the long exposure time (several minutes) meant that moving traffic cannot be seen; however, the two men at lower left (one apparently having his boots polished by the other) remained still long enough to be distinctly visible. Shoe shine posts were common in public places like railway stations throughout the 20th century, as featured in Fred Astaire's dance number A Shine on Your Shoes.

A shoeshiner in Japan, 2016 (video)

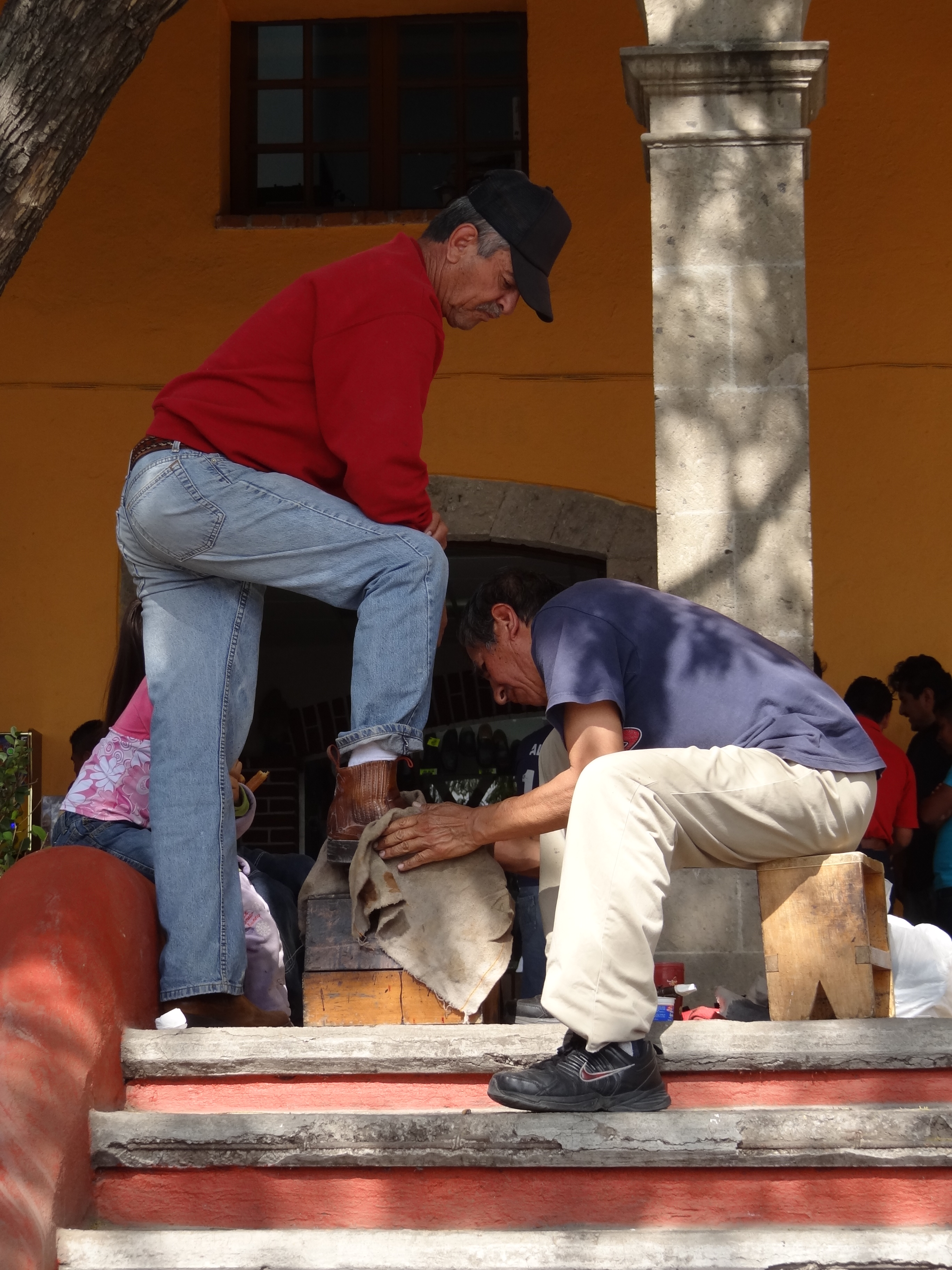
Shoeshiner at work in Tepotzotlan, Mexico.

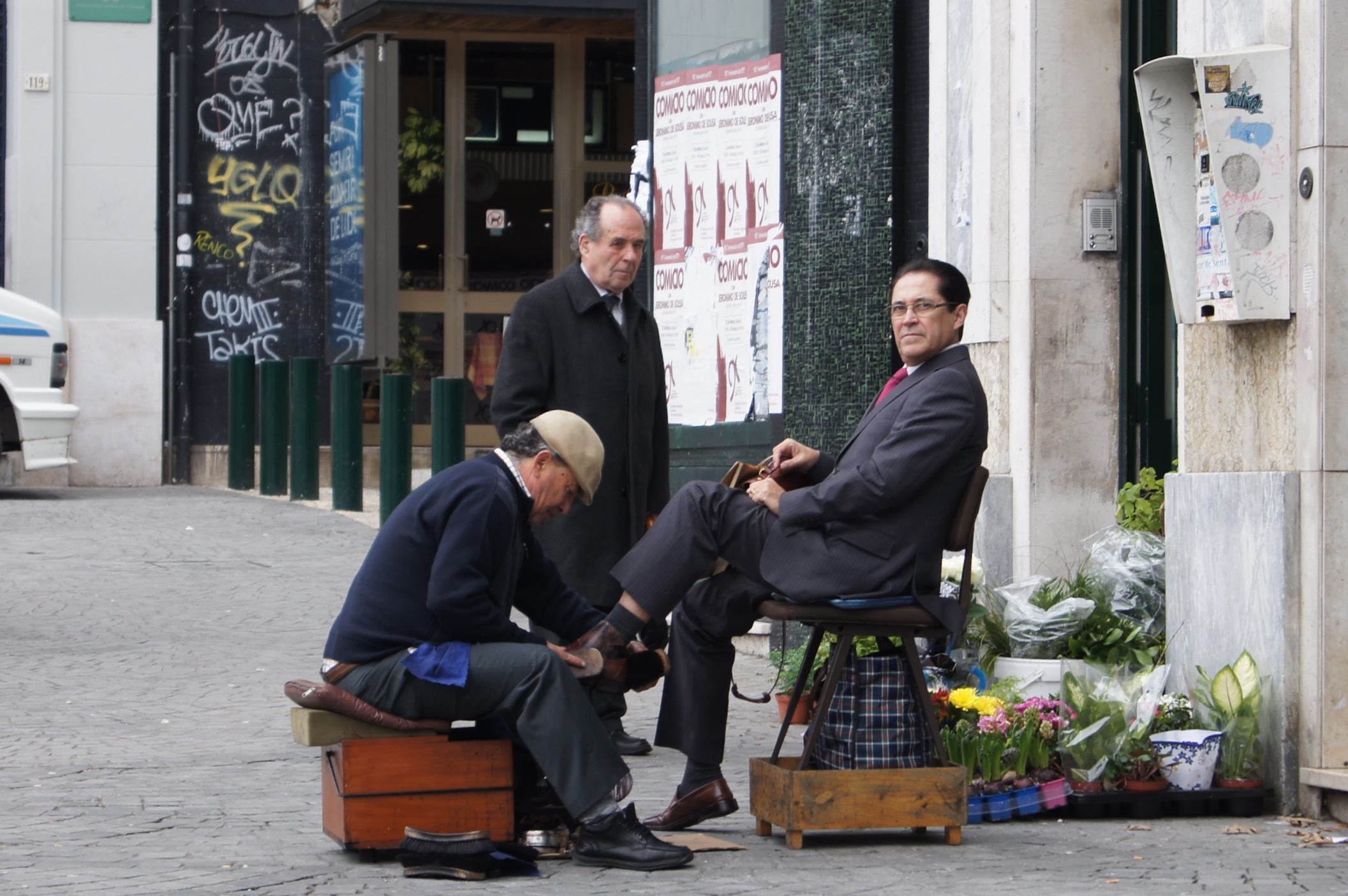
Shoeshiner at work in Porto, Portugal

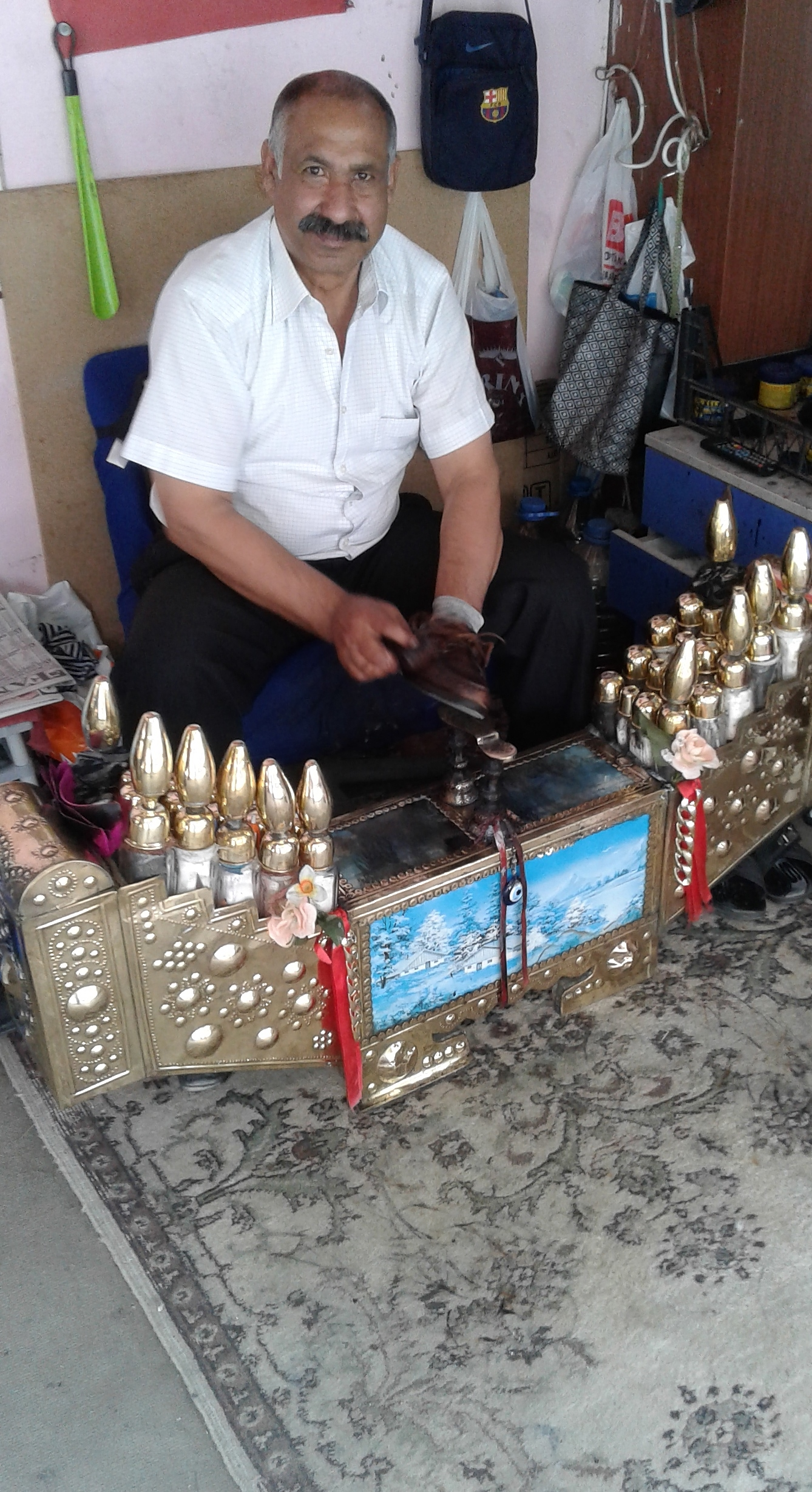
Shoeshiner in Istanbul, Turkey

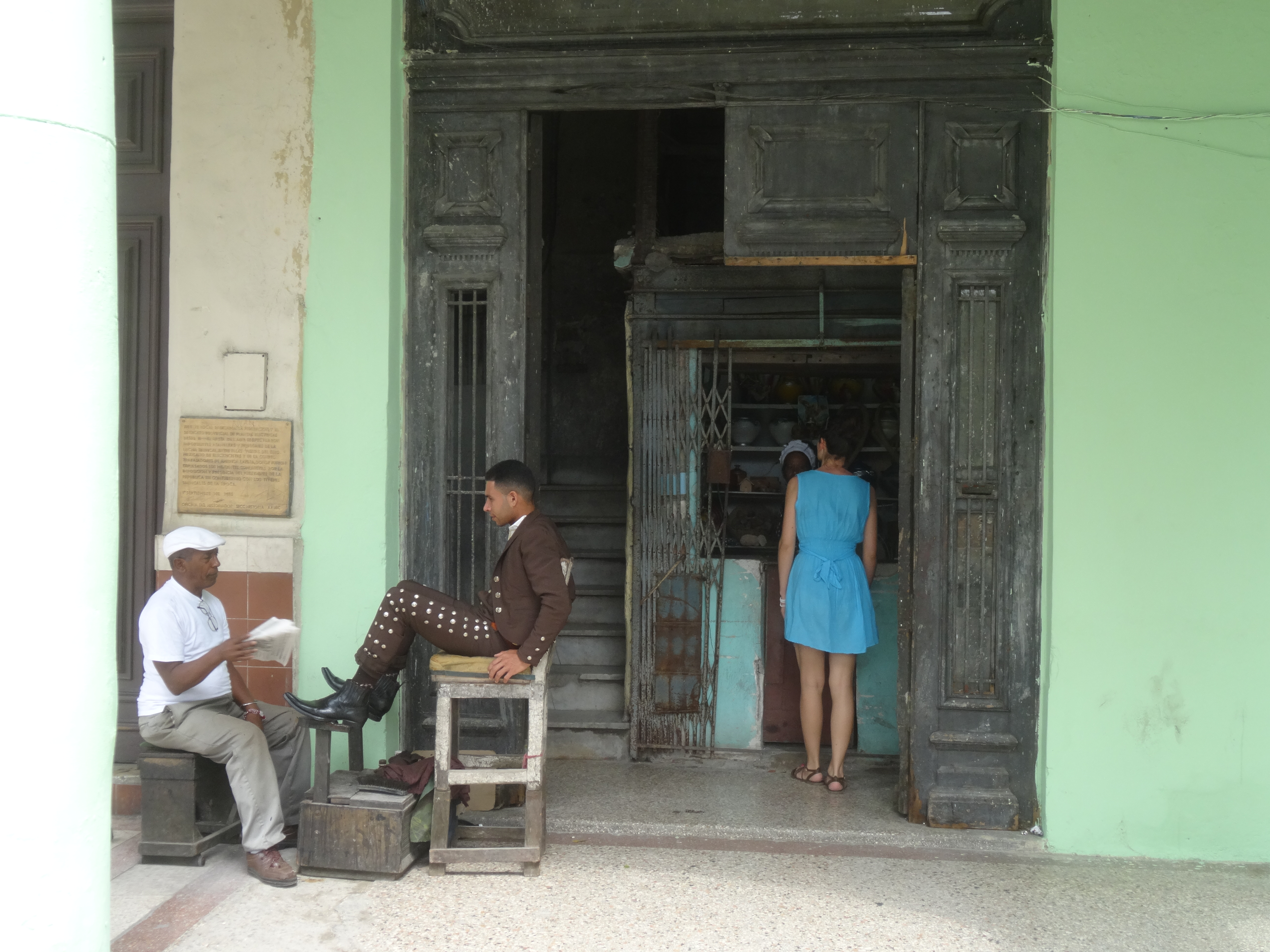
Shoeshiner at work in Havana, Cuba, 2014

== Modern profession ==
The profession is common in many countries around the world, with the revenue earned by the shoeshiner being a significant proportion of a family's income, particularly when the father of the family has died or can no longer work. In Afghanistan some children will work after school and can earn 100 Afghanis (around £1) each day. Many street children use shoeshining as their only means of income.

Some cities require shoeshiners to acquire licences in order to work legally. In August 2007 shoeshiners in Mumbai, India were told that they could no longer work on the railway stations due to "financial irregularities". Every Shoeshine Association was asked to reapply for their license, with many worried that they would lose out to a rival.

In addition to street shoe shiners, in some countries, among others Japan, the US and Singapore, there are artisanal shoeshines who specialize in the care of bespoke luxury shoes. These are usually found at high-priced men's outfitters or operate as independent businesses.

Since 2017, annual World Championships in Shoe Shining are hosted in London. During the contest, the candidates are tasked with shining one shoe to the best of their ability within 20 minutes. The best mirror shine is awarded by a jury of experts. In London, luxury shoeshining is available in the arcades, particularly in the Princes Arcade, St James's.

== Famous shoeshiners ==
Several high-profile figures worked as shoeshiners at one point in their lives:

- Mahmoud Ahmed – Ethiopian singer.
- James Brown – "The Godfather of Soul", used to shine shoes and sing and dance on 9th Street in Augusta, Georgia; in 1993 the road was renamed "James Brown Boulevard" in his honour.
- Luiz Inácio Lula da Silva – three-time President of Brazil.
- Alejandro Toledo – former President of Peru.
- Malcolm X – worked as a shoeshine boy at a Lindy Hop nightclub in New York City.
- Rod Blagojevich – former Governor of Illinois.
- Sammy Sosa – former Dominican baseball player predominately for the Chicago Cubs.
- Husein Hasani – known to the people of Sarajevo as "Čika Mišo" (Uncle Mišo), last shoeshiner in Bosnia.
- Willie Brown – former San Francisco Mayor and Speaker of the California Assembly.
- Olivier Guimond Sr. – a Canadian burlesque comedian, was discovered while working as a shoeshine boy at Ottawa train station.

== Portrayal in popular culture ==
Shoeshiners have featured in:

=== Film and television ===
- Shoe Shine Boy, a 1943 film musical
- Shoeshine, a 1946 Italian film which received honours at the 1948 Academy Awards
- Boot Polish, a 1954 Hindi film
- El Bolero de Raquel, 1956 Mexican film starring Cantinflas
- Prince of Space, a 1959 science-fiction film
- Underdog, a 1964 animated television series in which an anthropomorphic dog, Shoeshine Boy, battles crime as the titular canine superhero.
- The Adventures of Timothy Pilgrim, a 1975 Canadian children's TV series
- Goodfellas, Martin Scorsese's 1990 gangster film, features a scene in which hair trigger-tempered Lucchese crime family wiseguy, Tommy DeVito (Joe Pesci), brutally beats Gambino crime family mobster, Billy Batts (Frank Vincent), for insulting him about being a shoeshine boy in Tommy's younger days. The film is based on the real-life experiences of Henry Hill and the people he met through the Vario brothers, who owned a shoeshine stand and other businesses. In real life, William "Billy Batts" Bentvena taunted Thomas "Two Gun Tommy" DeSimone, calling him "spit-shine Tommy". DeSimone retorted by yelling, "Shine these fuckin' shoes", and then executing Batts.
- Parks and Recreation, a 2009 American TV show, in which Andy Dwyer, one of the main characters gets a job in Pawnee City Hall shining shoes.
- Le Havre, Aki Kaurismäki, 2011.
- Coco, a 2017 film, in which the character of Miguel worked as a shoeshiner before going into shoemaking.
- Police Squad!, the spoof police procedural starring Leslie Nielsen featured a shoe shiner called Johnny, played by William Duell. As well as shining shoes and giving inside info on the latest case to main character Frank Drebin, Johnny appeared to have a vast knowledge of just about any subject his customers would ask him about, from fire safety to medical procedures, for a small tip. Tommy Lasorda and Dick Clark both had cameo appearances on Police Squad! playing themselves visiting Johnny's shoeshine stand, with Lasorda asking for advice on his pitching rotation and Clark inquiring about ska, then a musical genre which was starting to receive some mainstream attention, as well as receiving some anti-aging cream.

=== Literature and publications ===
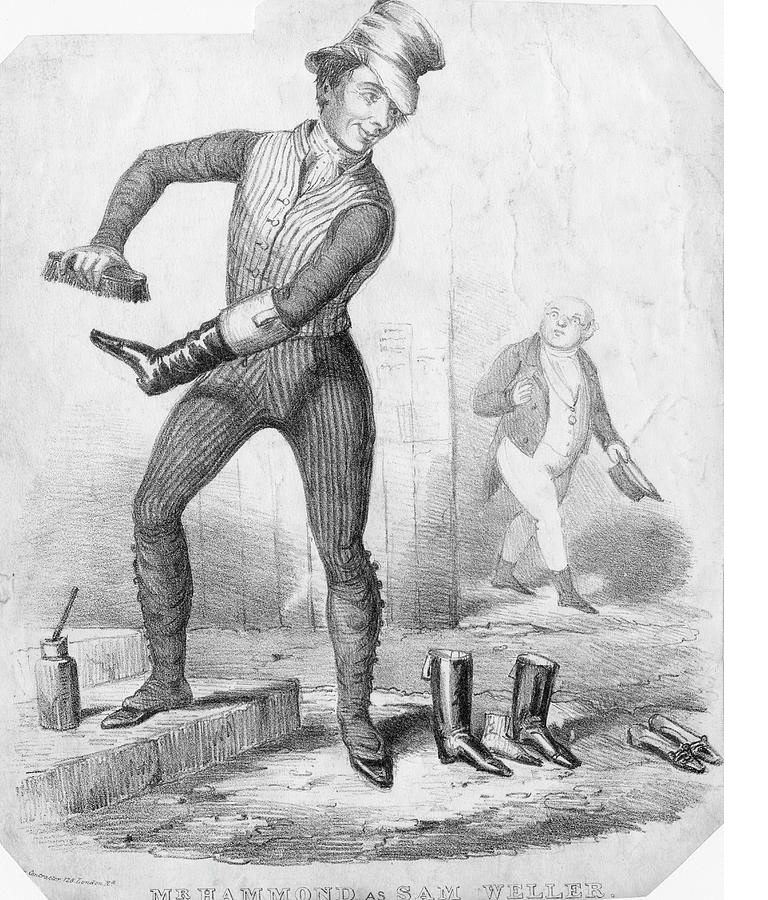
The actor W. J. Hammond as Sam Weller blacking boots (1837)

- Sam Weller, fictional Cockney bootblack in The Pickwick Papers (1836) by Charles Dickens.
- Ragged Dick, an 1867 dime novel by Horatio Alger Jr. about a poor but honest shoeshiner and his rise to middle-class comfort and respectability through good moral behavior, clean living, and determination. Shine!, a musical based on Alger's work, particularly Ragged Dick, was produced in 1982.
- Rajbahadur Bakhia the arch-villain in novels of Surender Mohan Pathak, was originally a shoeshiner at the flora fountain area of Mumbai, and had his introduction to the underworld over a payment dispute with a small-time gangster who refused to pay him.
- Scrooge McDuck, the Dell Comics character, famously won his Number One Dime shining shoes.

=== Music ===
- The opening lines of "Chattanooga Choo Choo" (1941) are a dialogue between a passenger and a shoeshine boy.
- "Chattanoogie Shoe Shine Boy" (1949), a song performed by Red Foley, Bing Crosby, Scatman Crothers, and Frank Sinatra among others.
- In "Get Rhythm" (1956), written and performed by Johnny Cash, the song's narrator asks a "little shoeshine boy" who has "the dirtiest job in town" how he keeps from getting the blues. The shoeshine boy "grinned as he raised his little head / He popped a shoeshine rag, and then he said / Get rhythm..."
- "Shoeshine Man" (1970), a song by Tom T. Hall.

== See also ==
- Shoe shiners in Hong Kong
- Working Boy Center, aid and development for shoeshine and street worker children
- Bull polishing
- Bootblacking (BDSM)
