= The Parsonage (Natick, Massachusetts) =

Historic house in Massachusetts, United States

- U.S. National Register of Historic Places
- U.S. National Historic Landmark
- U.S. Historic district – Contributing property
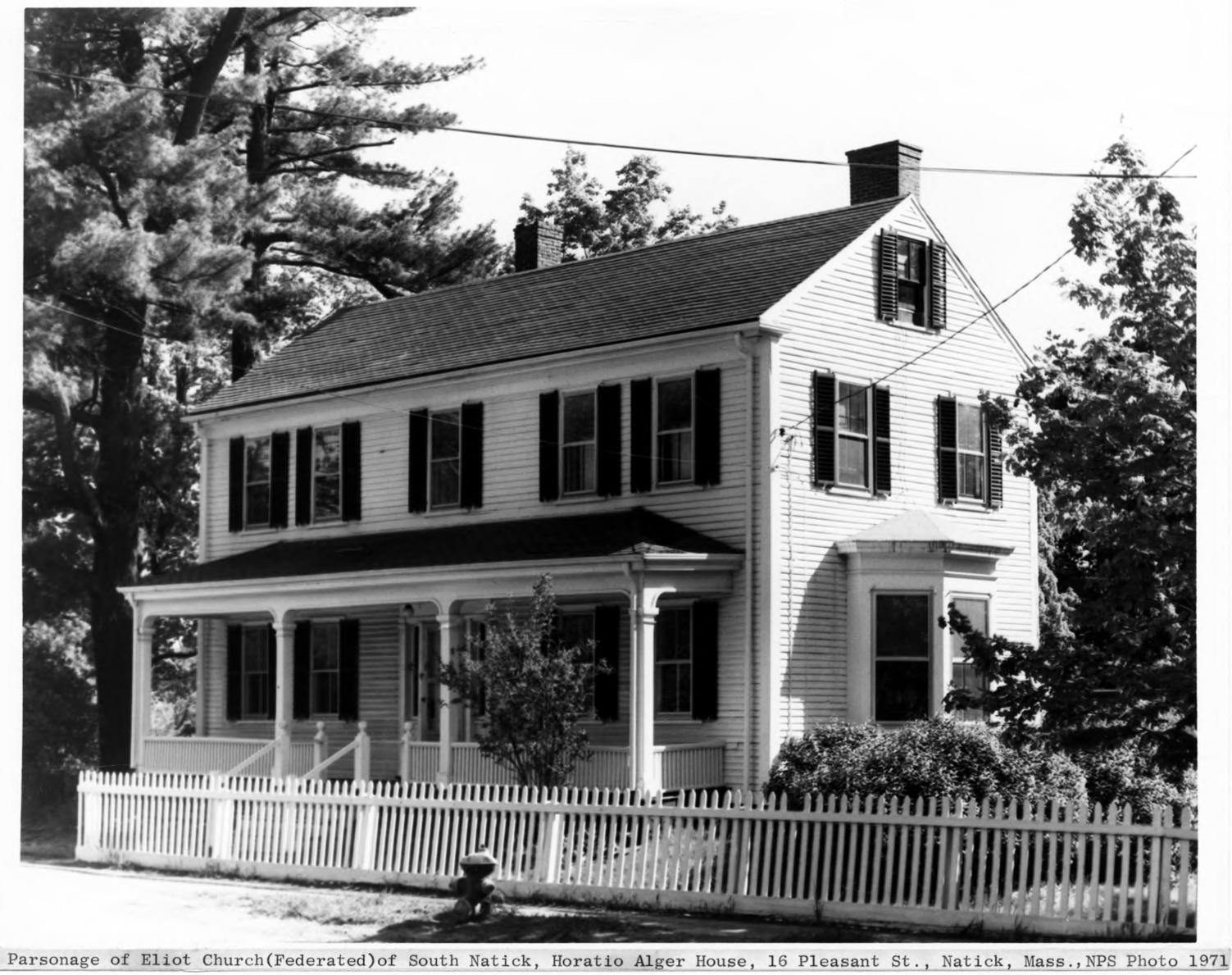
- The Parsonage in 1972

- Location within Massachusetts Location within the United States
- Location: Natick, Massachusetts
- Coordinates: 42°16′15″N 71°18′54″W
- Built: 1866
- Part of: John Eliot Historic District (ID83000812)
- NRHP reference No.: 71000903

Significant dates
- Added to NRHP: November 11, 1971
- Designated NHL: November 11, 1971
- Designated CP: June 23, 1983

The Parsonage (also known as the Horatio Alger House) is a historic house at 16 Pleasant Street in Natick, Massachusetts. It was designated a National Historic Landmark for its association with Horatio Alger (1832-1899), a well-known writer of popular juvenile fiction.

The 2 1/2-story wood-frame house is believed to have been built in the 1820s by Oliver Bacon. The main facade is five bays wide, with a single-story porch that extends for most of its width. The porch is supported by four square columns, with an entablature with round-arch connections to the posts. The center entry has sidelight windows. The right (southeast) side of the house has a single-story projecting bay window, and a two-story ell with garage projects from the north rear of the house, creating an L shape.

Horatio Alger was a prolific writer of somewhat formulaic upbeat rags-to-riches stories aimed primarily at boys. His works were immensely popular, but were not highly regarded by critics. Alger lived in New York City, but spent his summers at this house, where is father, parson to the Eliot Church, lived. The house had been purchased from Oliver Bacon by H. H. Hunnewell, specifically to support the elder Alger. The younger Alger was a regular visitor to the house between 1866 and 1877, and then again from 1879 until 1898, when he moved into the house. He died at his sister's house in Natick in 1899.

The house was listed on the National Register of Historic Places and declared a National Historic Landmark in 1971, and included in the John Eliot Historic District in 1977.

== See also ==
- List of National Historic Landmarks in Massachusetts
- National Register of Historic Places listings in Middlesex County, Massachusetts
