= Edmund Lazell =

Edmund Lazell was a member of the Constitutional Convention. He was born in Bridgewater, Massachusetts, British American in 1750. He married Mary Ford and had 2 children. He died on 30 Aug 1842 in Cummington, Hampshire, Massachusetts.

== See also ==
- Horatio Alger
