= Chaplin (1993 musical) =

Chaplin, A Memory as Entertainment
- Music: Roger Anderson
- Lyrics: Lee Goldsmith
- Book: Ernest Kinoy
- Productions: 1993 Shores Performing Arts Center, Miami, Florida; 2001 Golden Apple Theatre, Sarasota, Florida; 2007 Guildford Conservatoire, Guildford, United Kingdom; 2012 Guildhall School of Music and Drama, Barbican, London, UK

Chaplin is a musical about the early life of the silent film star Charlie Chaplin. The first act is portrayed in the genre of the British music hall, while in the second act, Chaplin goes to Hollywood, where he becomes "the Little Tramp".

The musical was announced to premiere on Broadway in 1981, but the project was cancelled. An abridged version premiered in Miami, Florida, in 1993 and played in Sarasota, Florida, in 2001. The musical had a brief run in London in 2012.

== History and productions ==
In July 1981, the musical was announced to open on Broadway in April 1982, with Joe Layton as director and choreographer, sets by Tony Walton, and produced by Don Gregory. Gregory said of the musical: "The story doesn't require an impersonation or imitation of Chaplin. It's about the years before he became the Tramp. It's not a psychological study, but it's about the years when he found that humor doesn't have to be spoken, and that sadness can be funny. That's why it's an important musical." In November 1981, it was announced that John Rubinstein would play the role of Chaplin. Plans were for the musical to start rehearsal on February 15, 1982 then have try-outs "at the Colonial Theater in Boston in April and open on Broadway on May 6 [1982]." Financial troubles forced postponements and the eventual cancellation of the project. Lee Goldmsith and Roger Anderson went on to collaborate on Shine! (1982).

In 1993, the script and score were re-examined, and a smaller version was produced in Miami, winning a Carbonell Award as Best New Work. Producer Paul Bartz saw the Miami production and obtained the rights and "has been carefully working to get it on the road to New York." His production ran at the Golden Apple Dinner Theatre in 2001. The Miami Herald, which described the show as "thoughtful, accessible and emotionally involving," said that Anderson's score "excels throughout" and is well matched with Goldsmith's "droll, witty and bittersweet" lyrics.

The musical was presented by The Guildhall School, London, at the Barbican Centre from 26 June 2012 to 4 July 2012. This was the first full production and the first that included the complete orchestration of the score.

Another musical about Chaplin, also titled Chaplin, with music and lyrics by Christopher Curtis and the book by Curtis and Thomas Meehan, opened on Broadway in September 2012.

== Concept ==
The play explores Chaplin's connection to the Commedia tradition and the evolution of The Little Fella. Book, lyrics and music are written using theatrical styles of each era in his life, from his conception and birth to his apparent triumph in his early twenties. The various styles include street performing, operetta, music hall, Punch and Judy, vaudeville, ballet and burlesque.
