= Čika Mišo =

Last shoeshiner in Sarajevo, Bosnia and Herzegovina

Husein Hasani
- Mišo in 2005
- Born: 22 December 1931; Uroševac, Vardar Banovina, Kingdom of Yugoslavia (modern Ferizaj, Kosovo)
- Died: 6 January 2014 (aged 82); Sarajevo, Bosnia and Herzegovina
- Resting place: Vlakovo
- Other name: Čika Mišo
- Years active: 1952–2014
- Spouse: Džemila (deceased)

Husein Hasani (22 December 1931 – 6 January 2014) was the last shoeshiner in the city of Sarajevo, Bosnia and Herzegovina. He was popular with Sarajevans and was known by all as "Čika Mišo" (Uncle Mišo).

== Background and personal life ==
Uncle Mišo was born Husein Hasani in 1931 in Uroševac, Kingdom of Yugoslavia. He had eight or nine siblings, and was the last living of all the Hasani children.

He was an ethnic Kosovar Roma and moved to Bosnia with his family as a teenager in 1946, just after the end of World War II. The nickname Mišo was given to him by his Hungarian boxing coach, who could not pronounce his name. He had said that his true love was boxing.

His wife, Džemila, predeceased him.

== Shoeshiner ==
In 1952, Mišo took over the job of shoe-shiner from his father, a job he would keep until his death six decades later. He was the last one to keep up with the traditional trade, which has deep roots in Bosnia, inherited from the centuries-long Ottoman rule of the region. His original "base" was in front of the Marijin Dvor building. He later moved himself to Marshal Tito Street, about twenty years before his death.

He sat on his chair on the sidewalk throughout the Siege of Sarajevo during the war in Bosnia and Herzegovina between 1992 and 1995, avoiding sniper fire. During the war years, he could hardly be convinced to move to a shelter during the shelling. Despite food shortages and poverty during the war, he always kept treats for Sarajevo's stray dogs, which he called his "faithful comrades" in the streets.

In the 2000s, Mišo appeared in three episodes of popular Bosnian TV series Viza za budućnost, where he played himself.

In 2009, Mišo was awarded a medal for merit by city authorities, as well as an apartment and a pension.

In an interview, he said: "There were shoe-cleaners in every street when I started and now, I'm the only one, why? Because I have been brave and people laughed at my jokes."

== Death ==
Uncle Mišo died of a heart attack in the morning hours of 6 January 2014 at the age of 82. The mayor of Sarajevo Ivo Komšić called Misho a "symbol of the city" of Sarajevo and stated that his death had left the city "emptier". Upon his death, the chair where he sat daily was adorned with candles, roses and shoes by passers-by.

He was buried in a graveyard in Vlakovo on 8 January 2014.

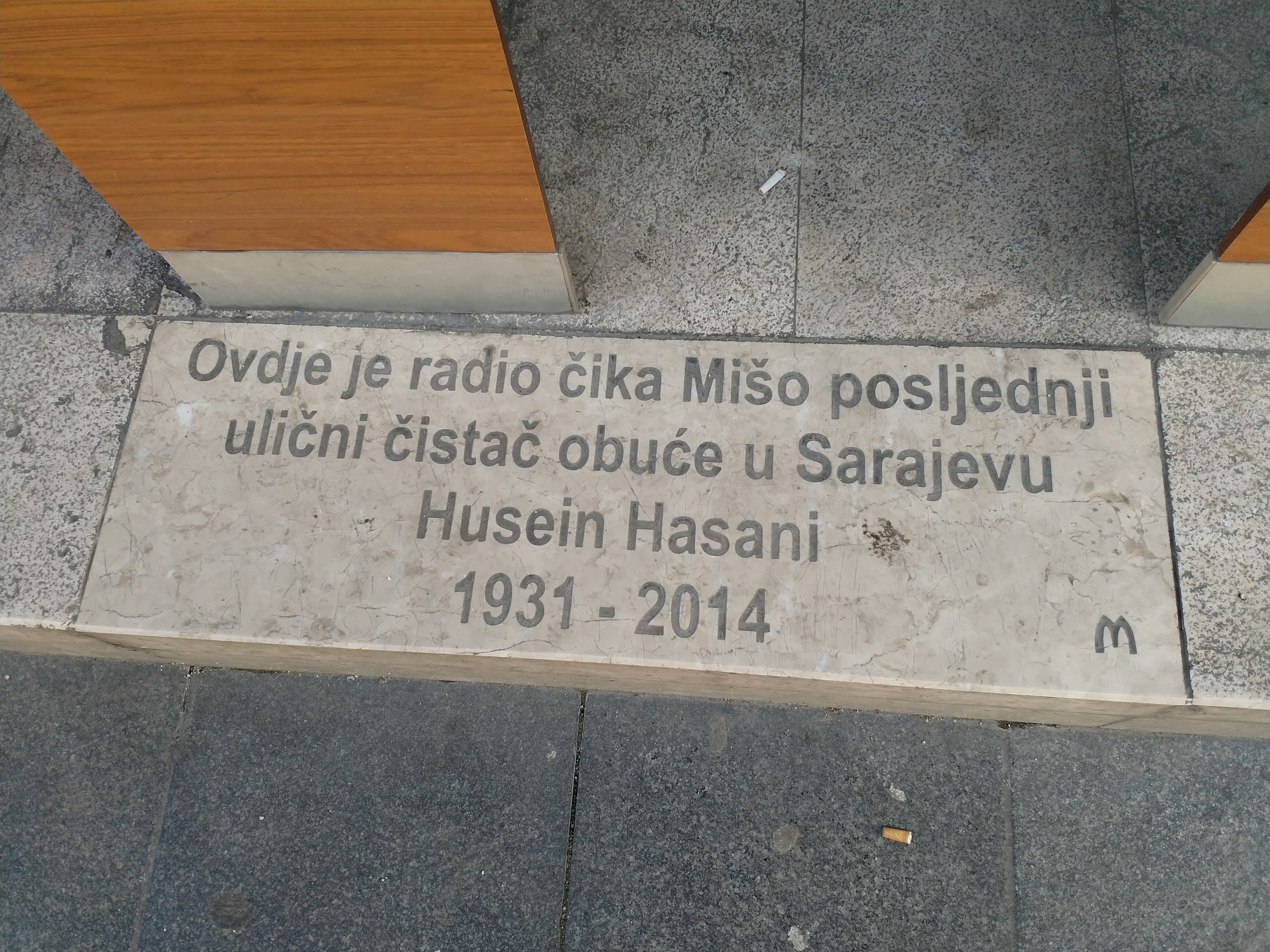
A plaque in remembrance of Husein "Mišo" Hasani

The day after his death, a petition calling for a memorial to be placed in the spot where he sat everyday was started on Facebook. On 11 January 2014, the workers of the McDonald's fast food restaurant in front of the spot where he worked paid for and set up a commemorative plaque that reads: "Here worked čika Mišo, the last shoe-shiner in Sarajevo. Husein Hasani 1931–2014."
