= Ragged Dick =

Book by Horatio Alger

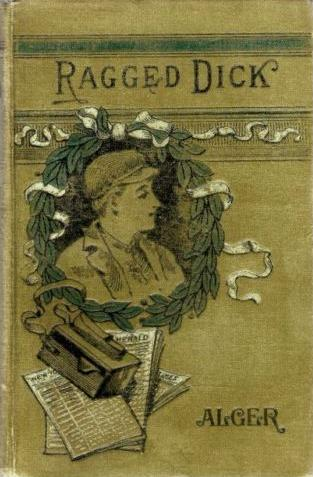
- Henry T. Coates and Company edition, 1895
- Author: Horatio Alger Jr.
- Original title: Ragged Dick; or, Street Life in New York with the Boot Blacks
- Language: English
- Series: Ragged Dick Series
- Genre: Bildungsroman
- Publisher: A. K. Loring
- Publication date: May 5, 1868
- Publication place: United States
- Media type: Print (Hardback)
- Followed by: Fame and Fortune

Ragged Dick; or, Street Life in New York with the Boot Blacks is a Bildungsroman by Horatio Alger Jr., which was serialized in The Student and Schoolmate in 1867 and expanded for publication as a full-length novel in May 1868 by the publisher A. K. Loring. It was the first volume in the six-volume Ragged Dick Series and became Alger's best-selling work. The tale follows a poor bootblack's rise to middle-class respectability in 19th-century New York City. It had a favorable reception. Student and Schoolmate reported their readers were delighted with the first installment, and Putnam's Magazine thought boys would love the novel. The plot and theme were repeated in Alger's subsequent novels and became the subject of parodies and satires.

Ragged Dick and Alger's Silas Snobden's Office Boy inspired the musical comedy Shine! in 1982.

== Synopsis ==
The story is set in New York City before the American Civil War. Ragged Dick is a fourteen-year-old bootblack – he smokes, drinks occasionally, and sleeps on the streets – but he is anxious "to turn over a new leaf, and try to grow up 'spectable". He won't steal under any circumstances, and many gentlemen who are impressed with this virtue (and his determination to succeed) offer their aid. Mr. Greyson, for example, invites him to church and Mr. Whitney gives him five dollars for performing a service. Dick uses the money to open a bank account and to rent his first apartment. He fattens his bank account by practicing frugality and is tutored by his roommate Fosdick in the three R's. When Dick rescues a drowning child, the grateful father rewards him with a new suit and a job in his mercantile firm. Dick has become a respectable member of the middle class at last, and henceforth will call himself Richard Hunter, Esq.

== Major themes ==
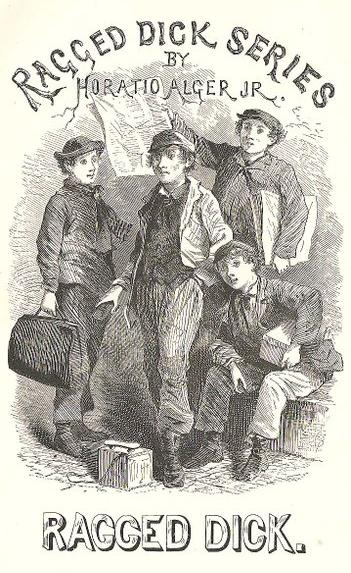
A plate from an early edition depicting a "smasher" (luggage boy), a newsboy, and two bootblacks

The Alger canon is described by Carl Bode of the University of Maryland as "bouncy little books for boys" that promote "the merits of honesty, hard work, and cheerfulness in adversity." Alger "emblematized those qualities" in his heroes, he writes, and his tales are not so much about rags to riches "but, more sensibly, rags to respectability". With a moral thrust entrenched in the Protestant ethic, Alger novels emphasized that honesty, especially of the fiscal sort, was not only the best policy but the morally right policy, and alcohol and smoking were to be abjured. Alger knew he wasn't writing great literature, Bode explains, but he was providing boys with the sort of material they enjoyed reading: formulaic novels "whose aim was to teach young boys how to succeed by being good" and which featured "active and enterprising" boy heroes sustained by "an endearing sense of humor" even in the most trying of situations. Dialogue was "brisk" in the Alger novel and "when good disputed with evil, good always won." Generally, a "malicious young snob" and a "middle-aged rascal" schemed to hurt the hero's rise, and a "mysterious stranger" and a "worldly but warmhearted patron" were at hand to ensure his success. Violence was kept at arm's length in the Alger novel, the tone remained "optimistic and positive", suspense was never "of the nail-biting sort", and the Alger universe was "basically benign". Bode points out that the problems of upward mobility in the Alger novel were never "insoluble", and, although luck was a major element in the Alger plot, it was never luck alone that brought the hero success but luck combined with "pluck".

Gary Scharnhorst finds six major themes in Alger's 100-plus boys' books and considers that the major theme of Ragged Dick is a rise to respectability. Scharnhorst points out that Dick states he intends to change his way of life and "become 'spec-table". Early in the book, Mr. Whitney "replaces Dick's suit with a neat one, signaling the beginning of the transformation from Ragged Dick into Richard Hunter, Esq." Scharnhorst follows Dick's progress through the tale to the moment when Dick is rewarded with a clerical position and notes that "The status of respectability, not a high salary, completes his transition from Ragged Dick to Richard Hunter." Scharnhorst writes, "The recurrence in Alger's fiction of the theme of the Rise to Respectability underscores the inaccuracy of the widespread opinion that his heroes rise from rags to riches. Indeed, insofar as Alger's heroes prosper at all, they do so because they deserve prosperity, because they happily earn it with their virtue ... Alger's heroes always merit their good fortune—an idea which, like respectability, is associated only tangentially to wealth."

== Development of the theme of the story ==
Alger had served as a Unitarian minister in Brewster, Massachusetts for about a year and a half when a church committee charged him with pederasty. He denied nothing, said that he had been imprudent, and resigned from the ministry, vowing never to accept another ministerial post. Church officials were satisfied, and no further action was taken. Alger relocated to New York City, where he cultivated a humanitarian's interest in the city's many vagrant children. A prolific author, he published to great success in Student and Schoolmate, a children's monthly magazine, and when its publisher asked him to develop a serial about street boys he wrote Ragged Dick, a tale about bootblacks.

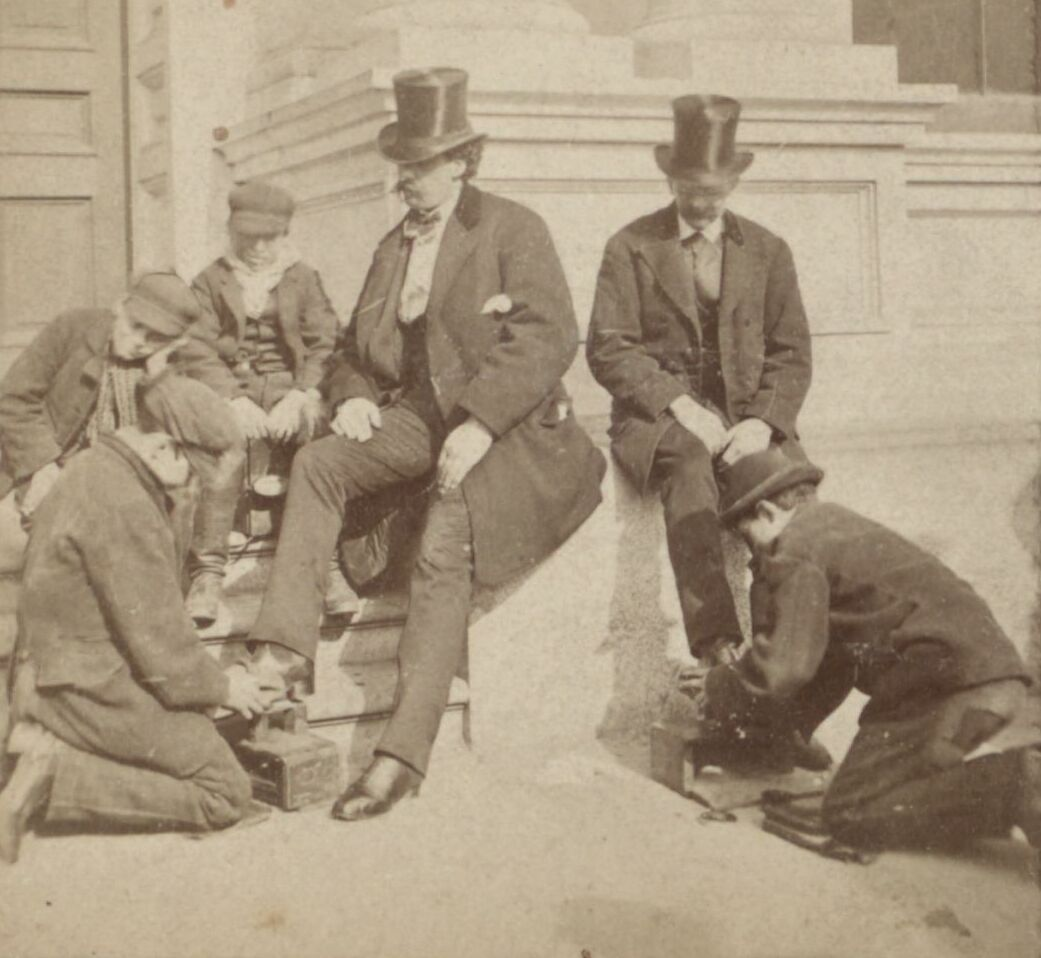
Bootblacks, circa 1870

New York City's bootblacks at the time Alger wrote Ragged Dick were boys, usually between the ages of ten and sixteen, "with any number of bad habits, and little or no principle". They gambled, smoked cigar butts retrieved from the gutter, patronized Bowery theaters and concert halls, slept on the streets or in shelters supported by the charitable, and were "more proficient in profanity than the Water Street roughs". Alger told the Ladies Home Journal in 1890, "I had conversations with many street boys while writing 'Ragged Dick' ... and derived from many of them sketches of character and incidents".

Alger adapted the conventions of the moral, sentimental, and adventure literature of the period to fashion the formula he would employ in writing Ragged Dick and the dozens of boys' books that followed it. "Alger did not invent his formula out of whole cloth," Alan Trachtenberg wrote, "but boiled down the conventions to make a more refined brew: a style accessible both to young and adult readers; clever dialogue and vivid descriptions; a cast of characters who presented a range of moral positions; a physical setting itself a part of the action."

Trachtenberg points out that Alger almost certainly consulted New York City guidebooks and incorporated their advice on crooks, cheats, and conmen into his manuscript, and explains that Alger's series books and characters bear similarities to the anecdotal nature of myths, legends, and folktales: "Stories of gods and of larger-than-life persons like Paul Bunyan have an anecdotal quality similar to the sequence of encounters, adventures, confrontations, and coincidences that comprise the narratives of Ragged Dick and Tattered Tom and their kin among Alger's legion of boy heroes."

Ragged Dick has been described as a "puerile fantasy of the assimilation of the so-called dangerous classes to the bourgeois social order", but Sacvan Bercovitch believes Alger created "a relatively realistic hero" in Dick—one who smokes, swears, plays pranks, and spends what money he has with abandon, yet one who displays an emotional depth foreign to Alger's subsequent heroes, who increasingly exhibited "the slow accretion of civilized instincts and habits, including proper speech, cleanliness, and courtesy" and who lacked Dick's "sense of humor, sadness, and critical intelligence".

== Possible homoeroticism ==
Trachtenberg points out that Alger had tremendous sympathy for boys and discovered a calling for himself in the composition of boys' books: "He learned to consult the boy in himself," Trachtenberg writes, "to transmute and recast himself—his genteel culture, his liberal patrician sympathy for underdogs, his shaky economic status as an author, and not least, his dangerous erotic attraction to boys—into his juvenile fiction." He believes it impossible to know whether Alger lived the life of a secret homosexual, "[b]ut there are hints that the male companionship he describes as a refuge from the streets—the cozy domestic arrangements between Dick and Fosdick, for example—may also be an erotic relationship."

Trachtenberg observes that nothing prurient occurs in Ragged Dick but posits that "the few instances of boys touching each other tenderly or older men laying a light hand on the shoulder of boys, might arouse erotic wishes in readers prepared to entertain such fantasies." Such images, Trachtenberg believes, may imply "a positive view of homoeroticism as an alternative way of life, of living by sympathy rather than aggression." Trachtenberg concludes, "in Ragged Dick we see Alger plotting domestic romance, complete with a surrogate marriage of two homeless boys, as the setting for his formulaic metamorphosis of an outcast street boy into a self-respecting citizen."

== Publication history ==
Ragged Dick was first published as a 12-part serial in Student and Schoolmate, beginning with January 1867 issue. Alger expanded the tale into a novel, which was published by A. K. Loring of Boston on May 5, 1868. Thousands of copies sold out within weeks, and the novel was republished in August 1868. It was the first in a six-volume Ragged Dick series (1: Ragged Dick 2: Fame and Fortune 3: Mark, the Match Boy 4: Rough and Ready 5: Ben, the Luggage Boy 6: Rufus and Rose). The book was Alger's best-selling work and remained in print for forty years.

== Literary significance and reception ==
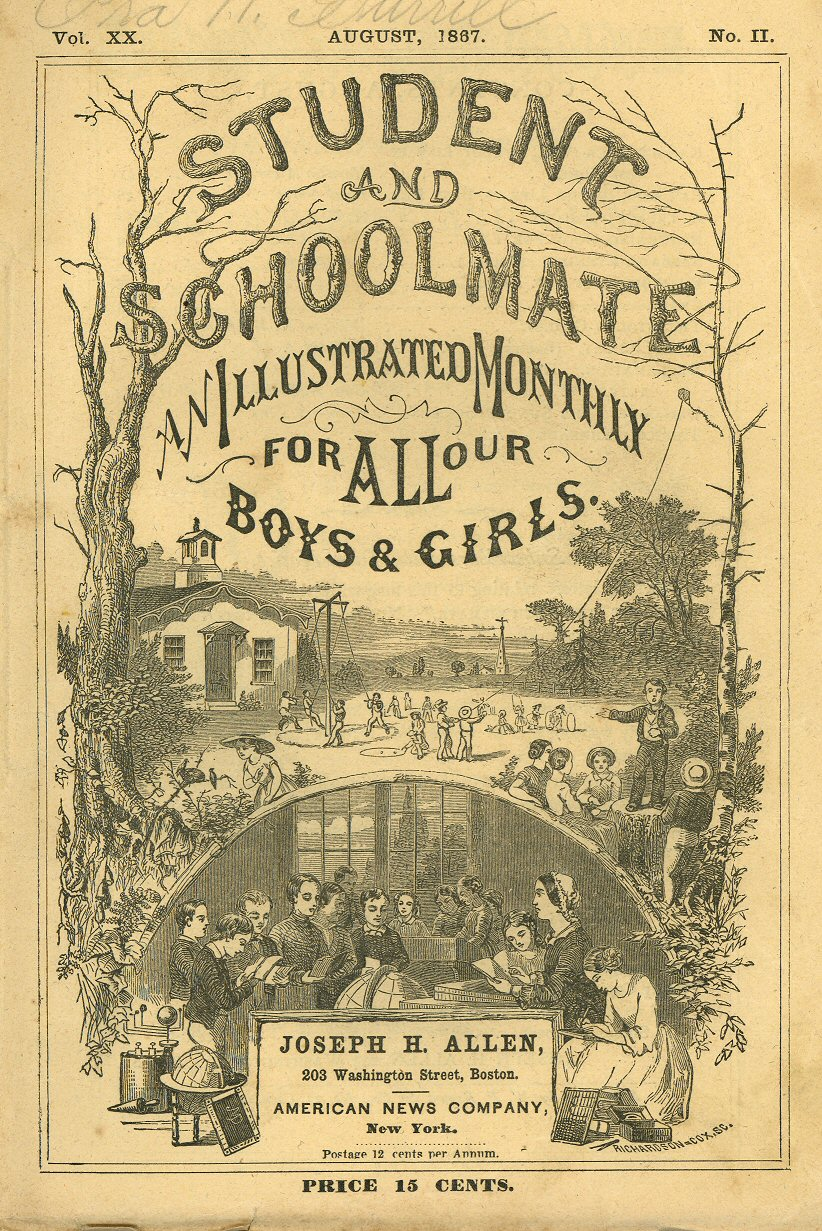
Student and Schoolmate, August 1867

Student and Schoolmate reported in its February 1867 issue that the first installment of Ragged Dick "has created no little excitement among our numerous readers, as we supposed it would. Everybody is delighted." Scharnhorst observes that the Providence Evening Press, the Boston Transcript, The Christian Register, and the Monthly Religious Magazine praised the story, describing it as "simply charming", "excellent", and "spirited and inspiring". According to Scharnhorst, Booth Tarkington acknowledged the book as one of ten that made the "greatest impression on his life", and in 1947 "the Grolier Club of New York selected it as one of the hundred most influential American books published before 1900."

Putnam's Magazine, in its issue of July 7, 1868, wrote that "Ragged Dick is a well-told story of street-life in New York, that will, we should judge, be well received by the boy-readers, for whom it is intended. The hero is a boot-black, who, by sharpness, industry, and honesty, makes his way in the world, and is, perhaps, somewhat more immaculate in character and manners that could naturally have been expected from his origin and training. We find in this, as in many books for boys, a certain monotony in the inculcation of the principle that honesty is the best policy, a proposition that, as far as mere temporal success is concerned, we believe to be only partially true. However, the book is very readable, and we should consider it a much more valuable addition to the Sunday-school library than the tales of Inebriates, and treatises on the nature of sin, that so often find place there."

Edwin P. Hoyt writes that "Ragged Dick ... caught the American fancy ... [It] represented something virtually unknown to boys in the American countryside and totally unsung until [its publication]: the street waif who made his living in the jungles of brick and stone". Hoyt points out the Alger refined the many "stylistic tricks" he had been polishing for several years. The action displayed an authorial confidence, and the language captured the "coarse and ungrammatical" style of the metropolitan street boys. The book was a virtual guide to Manhattan in 1866, and "for that reason if for no other it approached the realm of literature". Hoyt points out that "[T]here had never been such a book ... one swindle after another is exposed to readers who had never heard of such things."

Scharnhorst indicates Alger's legacy resides not only in the several parodies and satires by William Dean Howells, Stephen Crane, F. Scott Fitzgerald, Nathanael West, John Seelye, Glendon Swarthout, and William Gaddis, but also in the Horatio Alger Awards and in the many young readers who embraced his moral and humanitarian philosophy and were disinclined to embrace robber baron capitalism. Scharnhorst writes "It would seem that Alger was either over-rated as an economic and political propangandist or – more probably – his books were simply not designed thematically to spread the gospel of orthodox capitalism and convert the readership of The Masses.

== Adaptations ==
Ragged Dick and Alger's Silas Snobden's Office Boy inspired the 1982 musical comedy Shine! The show's librettist, Richard Seff, writes that the musical is an original based on Ragged Dick and Silas Snobden's Office Boy: "We've borrowed characters from both novels, youthened some, aged others, re-invented a few, created a few of our own. We stuck with Alger's pervasive theme: That in America one could begin with nothing, and with the right attitude, hard work, application and a little bit of luck, dream a dream and chart a course on which to achieve it."

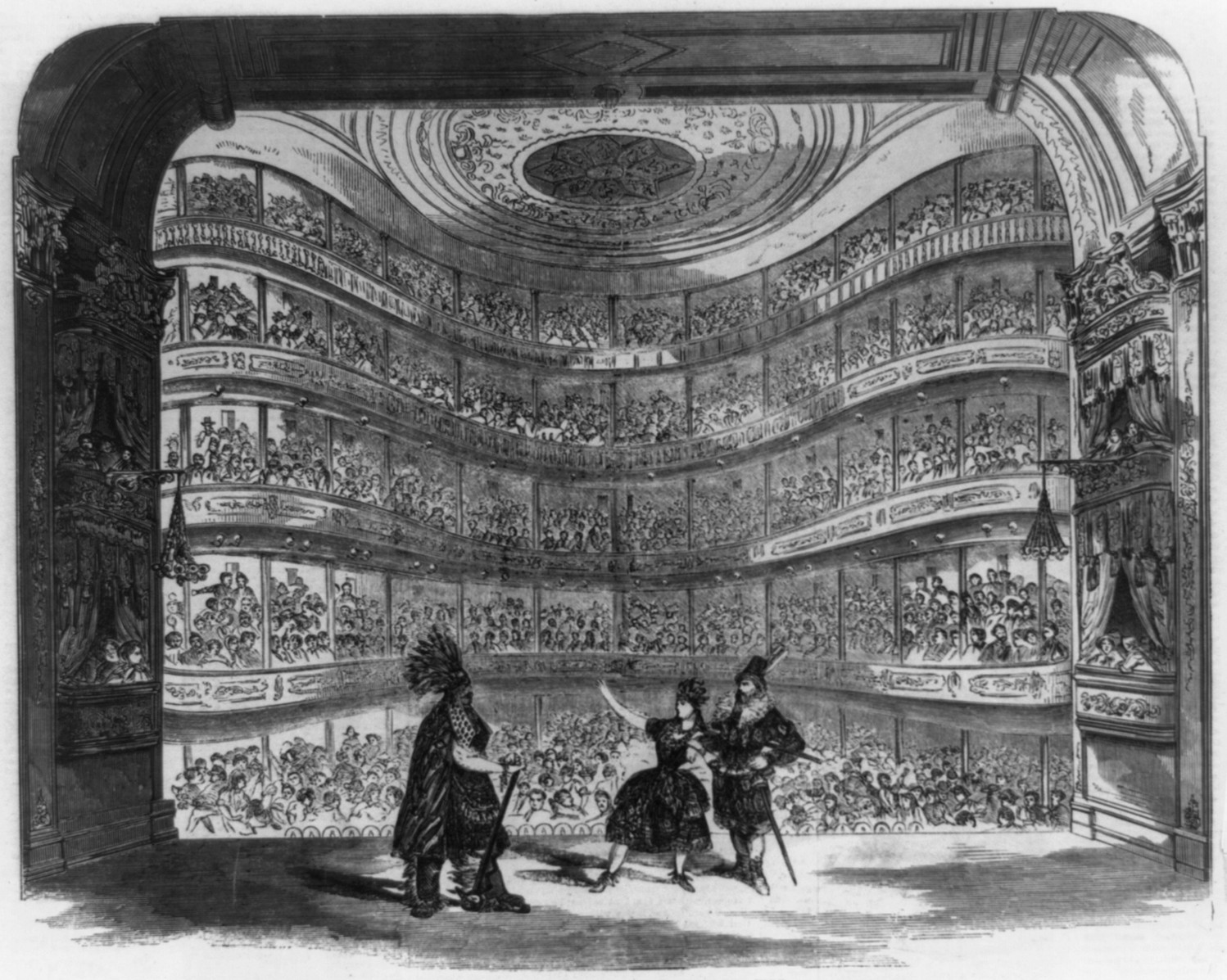
The Bowery Theatre, one of Ragged Dick's haunts before his reformation

Eugene Paul reviewed a production mounted by the New York Musical Theatre Festival in 2010 and wrote that "Virtue ... is the message and the thrust of the show." In his plot summary, Paul wrote that Ragged Dick is working his way slowly up the ladder of respectability when an opportunity to improve his prospects is offered him in Snobden's haberdashery. He faces a setback when his wicked stepfather, Luke, arrives on the scene. Dick avoids him and pursues his goals. "But everything comes crashing down when the darling son of a noble banker who has befriended Dick is kidnapped by none other than his stepfather, Luke. Suspicion and hatred, none of which Dick deserves, force him out of his job ... If you want to know how Dick overcomes these tribulations—but then, you already know, don't you. There is always a happy ending in Horatio Alger's stories."
