= The Student and Schoolmate =

19th century American children's magazine

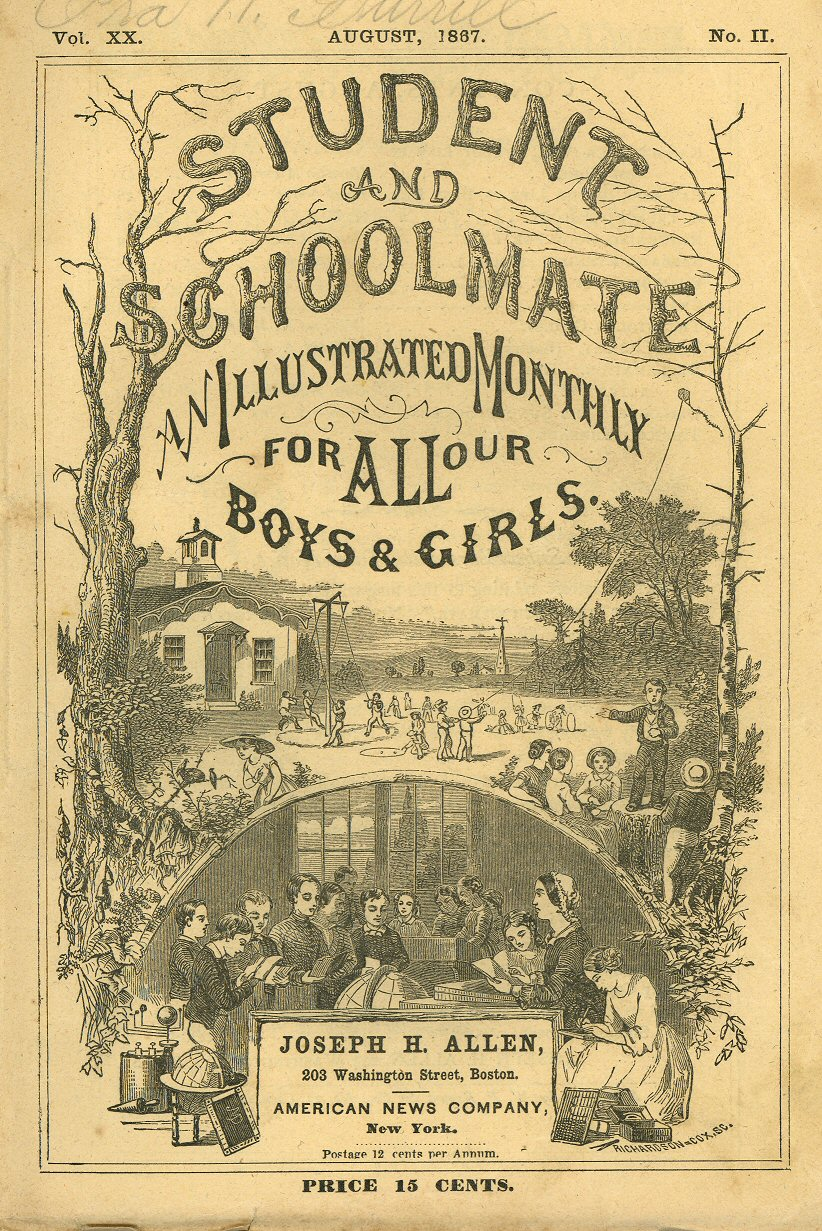
- The Student and Schoolmate, August 1867
- Editor: William Taylor Adams (1858–1862)
- Categories: Children's magazine
- Frequency: Monthly
- Circulation: 9,000 (in 1870)
- Founded: 1855
- First issue: 1855
- Final issue: 1872 (as The Schoolmate)
- Country: United States
- Based in: New York City, New York; Boston, Massachusetts
- Language: English

The Student and Schoolmate was a 19th-century monthly American children's magazine. It was the product of a merger of the children's magazines, The Student and The Schoolmate in 1855. In an 1860 advertisement seeking subscriptions at the price of $1 per year, the publishers reported it had nearly 15,000 subscribers, a figure it said was unmatched by any comparable U.S. publication. Its monthly features including a declamation, that is, a text annotated to instruct the student in delivering an oral presentation, and a piece of music for singing.

The magazine went through various name changes: The Student and Schoolmate (November 1855 – 1865); The Student and Schoolmate, and Forrester's Boy's and Girl's Magazine (1865–1866); (Note: Or perhaps as early as 1858: "The year 1848 saw the establishment of Forrester's Boys' and Girls' Magazine ... until its union with The School and Schoolmate in 1858".) The Student and Schoolmate (1866–1871); and The Schoolmate (1872).

Boys' book writer William Taylor Adams, who wrote under the pen name Oliver Optic, edited the magazine between 1858 and 1862. He published some of his boys' books as serials in its pages. Several of Horatio Alger, Jr.'s boys' books were first published as serials in the magazine, in twelve installments from January to December, including the bestselling of his works, Ragged Dick (1867), as well as Fame and Fortune (1868), Rough and Ready (1869), Rufus and Rose (1870), Paul the Peddler (1871), and Slow and Sure (1872).
