= Shine! =

SHINE!
- Music: Roger Anderson
- Lyrics: Lee Goldsmith
- Book: Richard Seff
- Productions: 1983 Virginia Museum Theatre, 2010 NYC Premiere Theatre at St. Clement's (NYMF)

SHINE! is a musical based on characters and situations found in the works of Horatio Alger, particularly 1868 novel Ragged Dick and Silas Snobden's Office Boy, respectively Alger's first best-seller and the one first printed in book form eighty years after it was first serialized in Argosy. Its plot and characters focus on Alger's pervasive theme: that in America one could begin with nothing, and with the right attitude, hard work, application, and a little bit of luck, dream a dream and chart a course on which to achieve it. Richard Seff wrote the book, Lee Goldsmith the lyrics and Roger Anderson the music. Anderson and Goldsmith had previously collaborated on the 1981 (later produced in 1993) musical Chaplin.

SHINE! was announced for Broadway in 1982, but production was canceled when producer 20th Century Fox disbanded its newly formed theatre division. The show was later produced in 1983 at the Virginia Museum Theatre in Richmond, Virginia, starring George Lee Andrews, Alix Korey and Todd Taylor. A reading of a revised version was seen in 1998 at Off-Broadway's York Theatre Company. In 2001, Shine! was part of the National Musical Theatre Network showcase. That performance was recorded and released by Original Cast Records in October 2001. The recording featured performers including Carole Shelley, Harvey Evans, Brooks Ashmanskas and Andréa Burns. The show was published by Samuel French, Inc. in 2002.

In October 2010 the New York premiere production of a completely revised version of the show took place at NYMF, Theatre at St. Clement's under the direction of Peter Flynn, choreography by Dev Janki, arrangements and orchestrations by Greg Anthony Rassen, and starring Andy Mientus as the hero.

== Musical numbers ==
Act I

- Prelude
- Wall Street Lament
- Shine!
- Look at Him
- Silas Snobden, Inc.
- Cock and Bull
- Maybe Today
- Put Your Money In
- Partners
- The Room
- Keeping Up With the Times
- A Hardworking Boy
- Look How Far We've Come

Act II

- Find That Boy
- A Hardworking Boy (Reprise)
- Shine (Reprise)
- From Now On
- Someone
- Yes!
- A Handful O' Hops
- North of 14th Street
