= Rags to riches =

Any situation in which a person rises from poverty to wealth

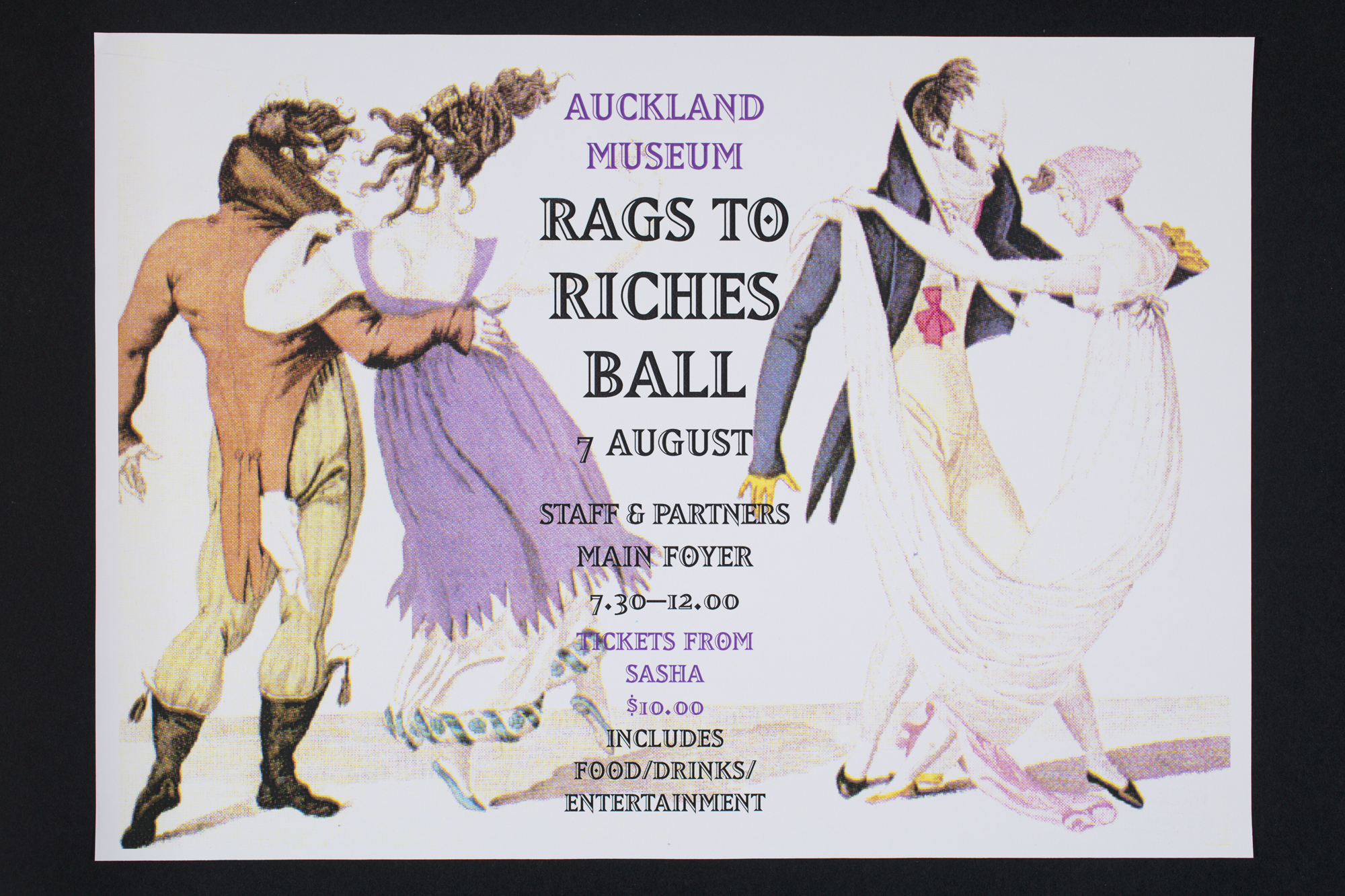
Poster for an Auckland Museum staff "Rags to Riches Ball". August 7, 1999.

Rags to riches (also rags-to-riches) refers to any situation in which a person rises from poverty to wealth, a form of social mobility. It is a frequent trope in fictional storytelling, where it is frequently portrayed as due to talent.

== Fictional examples ==
Rags-to-riches stories have appeared in works of fiction. Fairy tales like Cinderella or Aladdin, have included the trope. Additionally, other such folklore as Dick Whittington and His Cat, who, with the help of his cat, rises from orphaned poverty to become thrice Lord Mayor of London, or the Arthurian story of Sir Gareth, who rises from a lowly kitchen boy to a prominent Knight of the Round Table, also exemplify the trope.

Novels such as Oliver Twist or certain Horatio Alger works have also centered around the trope.

== Criticism ==
The concept of "rags to riches" has been criticized by social reformers, anti-capitalists, revolutionaries, essayists, and statisticians, who argue that only a handful of exceptionally capable and/or mainly lucky persons can travel the "rags to riches" road, being the great publicity given to such cases causes a natural survivorship bias illusion, which obscures cases contrary to the rags-to-riches narrative (sometimes called riches-to-rags). Peña and Weiss argue these misapprehensions help keep the masses of the working class and the working poor in line, and prevent them from agitating for an overall collective change in the direction of social equality.
